= Toyota Camry (XV20) =

Second generation of wide-body Toyota Camry

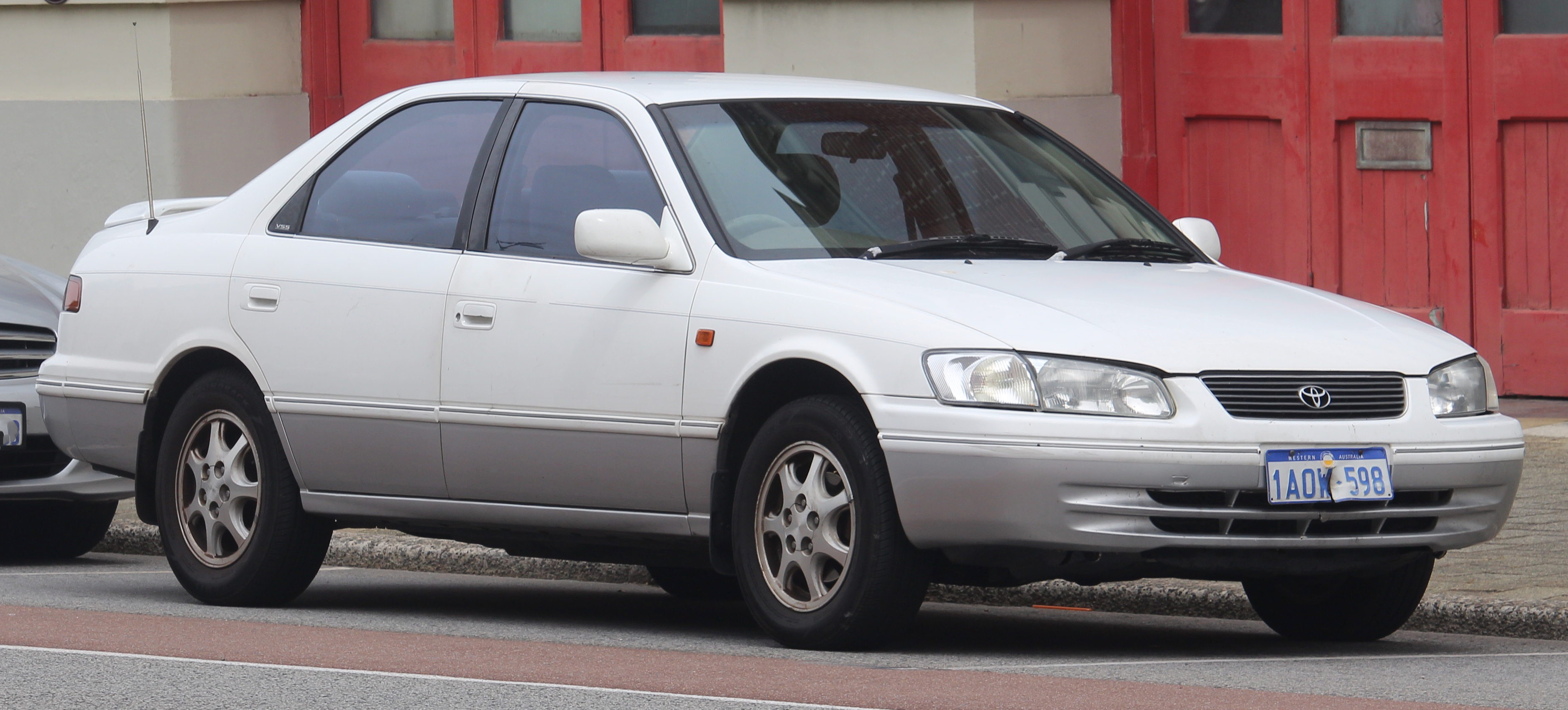
- Pre-facelift Toyota Camry Vienta 3.0 VXi sedan (MCV20R, Australia)

Overview
- Manufacturer: Toyota
- Model code: XV20
- Also called: Toyota Camry Gracia (Japan); Toyota Mark II Qualis (wagon); Toyota Vienta; Daihatsu Altis (Japan); Xinkai Toyota Camry (China, JV)
- Production: August 1996 – July 2001 (Japan, U.S.); September 1996 – June 2002 (Philippines); July 1997 – August 2002 (Australia); March 1997 – May 2002 (Thailand); June 1999 – September 2002 (Indonesia)
- Model years: 1997–2001
- Assembly: Japan: Toyota, Aichi (Tsutsumi plant); Australia: Altona; China: Zhanjiang, Guangdong; Indonesia: Karawang (1999–2002); Philippines: Parañaque (1996–1997); Santa Rosa (1997–2002); Thailand: Chachoengsao; United States: Georgetown, Kentucky; Vietnam: Vĩnh Phúc
- Designer: Kawazu Masahiko (1993)

Body and chassis
- Class: Mid-size car
- Body style: 4-door sedan; 5-door station wagon
- Layout: Front-engine, front-wheel drive; Front-engine, four-wheel drive
- Related: Lexus ES/Toyota Windom (XV20); Toyota Avalon (XX10); Toyota Camry Solara (XV20); Toyota Sienna (XL10)

Powertrain
- Engine: 2.2 L 5S-FE I4 (gasoline); 3.0 L 1MZ-FE VVT-i V6 (gasoline); 2.5 L 2MZ-FE V6 (gasoline)
- Transmission: 5-speed E153 manual; 5-speed S51 manual; 4-speed A140E automatic; 4-speed A541E automatic

Dimensions
- Wheelbase: 2,670 mm (105.1 in)
- Length: 4,765 mm (187.6 in)
- Width: 1,785 mm (70.3 in)
- Height: 1,430 mm (56.3 in)
- Curb weight: 1,360 kg (3,000 lb)

Chronology
- Predecessor: Toyota Camry (XV10); Daihatsu Applause (for Altis)
- Successor: Toyota Camry (XV30); Toyota Avalon (XX10) (Australia, for Vienta)

The Toyota Camry (XV20) is a mid-size car that was sold by Toyota between September 1996 and 2001 in Japan and North America, and 1997 and 2002 in Australia. Introduced on 3 September 1996, the XV20 series represented the fourth generation of the Toyota Camry in all markets outside Japan, which followed a different generational lineage. The XV20 Camry range is split into different model codes indicative of the engine. Inline-four models utilize the SXV20 (gasoline) and SXV23 (CNG) codes, with MCV20 designating the six-cylinder (V6) versions.

The XV20 Camry continued as a sedan and station wagon, though the latter model was not sold in North America, where the sedan was launched in 1996 for the 1997 model year. The XV20 Camry was offered in 2.2-liter inline-four and 3.0-liter V6 engined versions. In Australia, the luxury-oriented version was badged Toyota Vienta.

In Japan, this generation was sold as the Toyota Camry Gracia. An upmarket version of the wagon also sold as the Toyota Mark II Qualis. Furthermore, this was the first Camry to be badge-engineered as a Daihatsu; the Daihatsu Altis sold in Japan was identical to the export version of the Camry. The Japanese Scepter ceased to exist as the Japanese Camrys adopted the 1,795 mm (70.7 in) wide platform, thereby incurring an increased tax liability in Japan due to its extended length and width according to Japanese exterior dimension limits. The Vista began departing from the Camry, remaining 1,700 mm (66.9 in) wide and eventually forming the basis of the growing Corolla. In addition, the Vista's sheet metal resembled a tall, formal sedan, while the Camry became sleeker. The Lexus ES 300 was again built from the Windom, which uses the Camry chassis.

In August 1999 for the 2000 model year, the sedan models in North America received a mid-model upgrade to the front and rear fascias, this included larger headlights that now feature a four-bulb system instead of two, a separated grille with chrome surround, larger taillights, and larger body-side moldings. Toyota Australia started production of the facelift model in 2000.

== Development ==
As Japanese yen soared in the mid-1990s, the redesigned Camry had less content than the previous model under pressure to reduce costs. Following the debut of the XV10 in 1991, development immediately began under Kosaku Yamada under program code 415T. Styling ended with a winning design competition proposal "C" by Kawazu Masahiko being chosen in August 1993, 36 months ahead of scheduled production. The final XV20 design was frozen by early February 1994, at over 30 months ahead of scheduled production start in August 1996. Design patents were filed on 9 February 1994 at the Japan Patent Office and registered under #1057806. Prototypes were tested throughout 1995 and 1996.

== Engines ==
Body code	Engine	Equation	Model code	Power	Torque
XV20	2184 cc 5S-FE	S + X = SX (S + XV = SXV)	SXV20	97 kW (130 hp) at 5200 rpm	199 N⋅m (147 lb⋅ft) at 4400 rpm
XV20	2184 cc 5S-FNE (CNG)	S + X = SX (S + XV = SXV)	SXV23		
XV20	2496 cc 2MZ-FE	Z + X = C (MZ + XV = MCV)	MCV21	147 kW (197 hp) at 6000 rpm	244 N⋅m (180 lb⋅ft) at 4600 rpm
XV20	2995 cc 1MZ-FE	Z + X = C (MZ + XV = MCV)	MCV20	145 kW (194 hp) at 5200 rpm	283 N⋅m (209 lb⋅ft) at 4400 rpm

== Markets ==
XV20 Camrys were manufactured in at the Tsutsumi plant in Toyota, Aichi, Japan; Toyota Australia's Toyota Australia Altona Plant; and at the Toyota Motor Manufacturing Kentucky production site in Georgetown, Kentucky, United States. Production in Thailand and Indonesia began in 1999, replacing Australia as the source of Camrys in Southeast Asia.

=== Japan ===
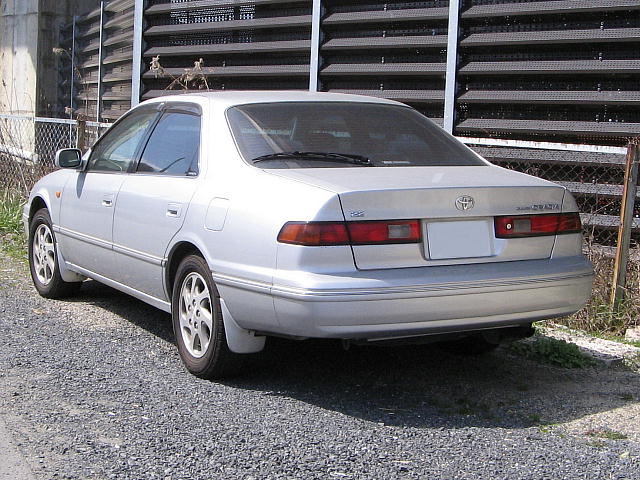
Pre-facelift Camry Gracia 2.2 sedan, note the rear wiper on the JDM model.

The Japanese market XV20 arrived in December 1996 as the Camry Gracia in both sedan and wagon body styles with a choice of a 2.2-liter four-cylinder or a 2.5-liter V6 engine with the only transmission choice being a 4-speed automatic. The Japanese Camry was basically only offered in single model grade, but buyers could choose the base "V Selection", the regular version, and the more-equipped "G Selection" for the 4-cylinder model. Only the regular and "G Selection" were for the V6 models. The "G Selection" came standard with 15-inch alloy wheels, heated door mirrors, leather steering wheel, 6-way power front seats, and upgraded sound system. Cruise control and Skyhook TEMS were only for the V6-powered "G Selection". Sporty Package which consisted of front lower spoiler, rear window visor, sunroof visor, and sports grille was dealer's option.

The Japanese-market Camry received minor facelift in August 1999. The "Gracia" name for sedan was dropped, although the station wagon version is still used.

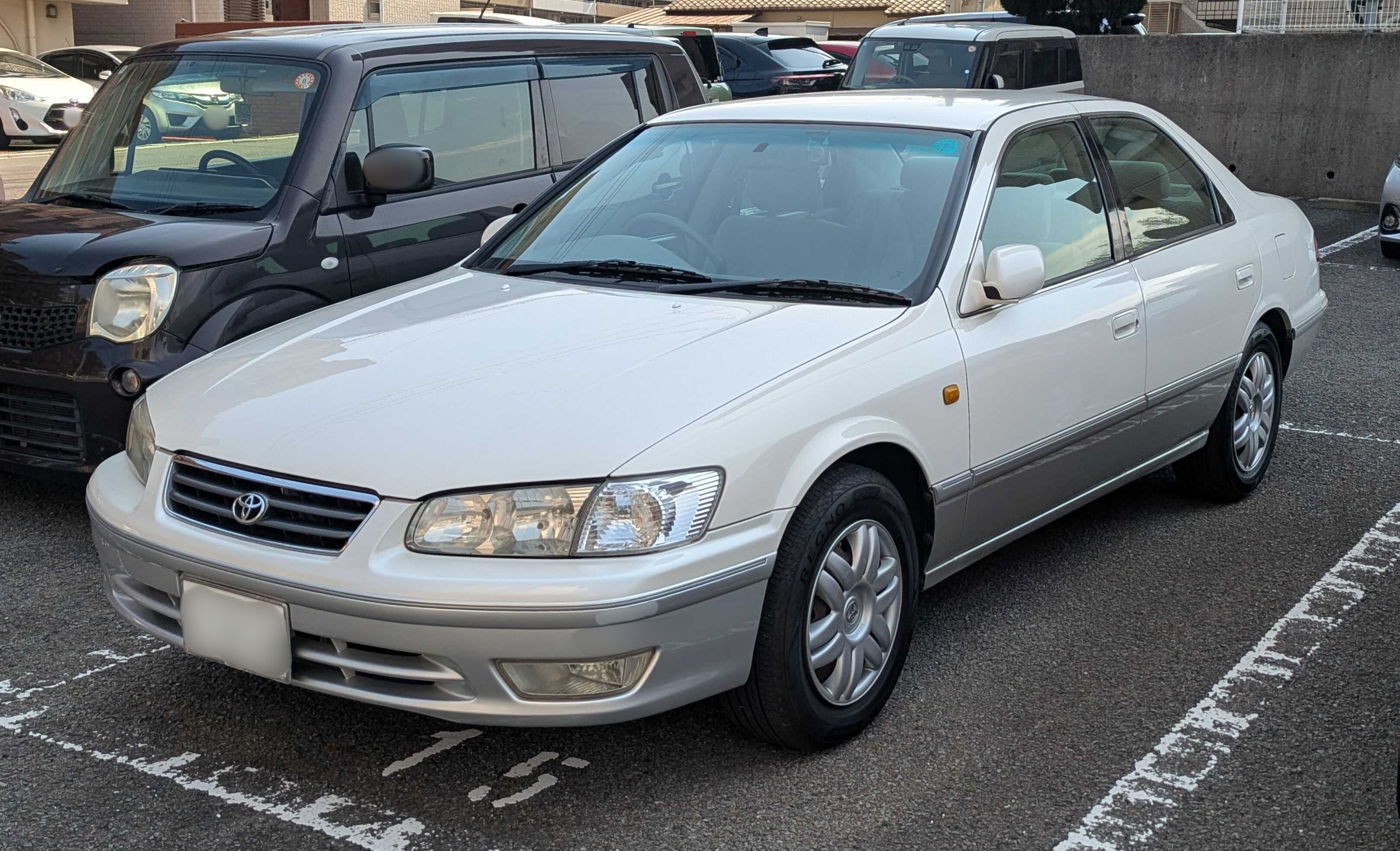
Facelift Toyota Camry (Japan)

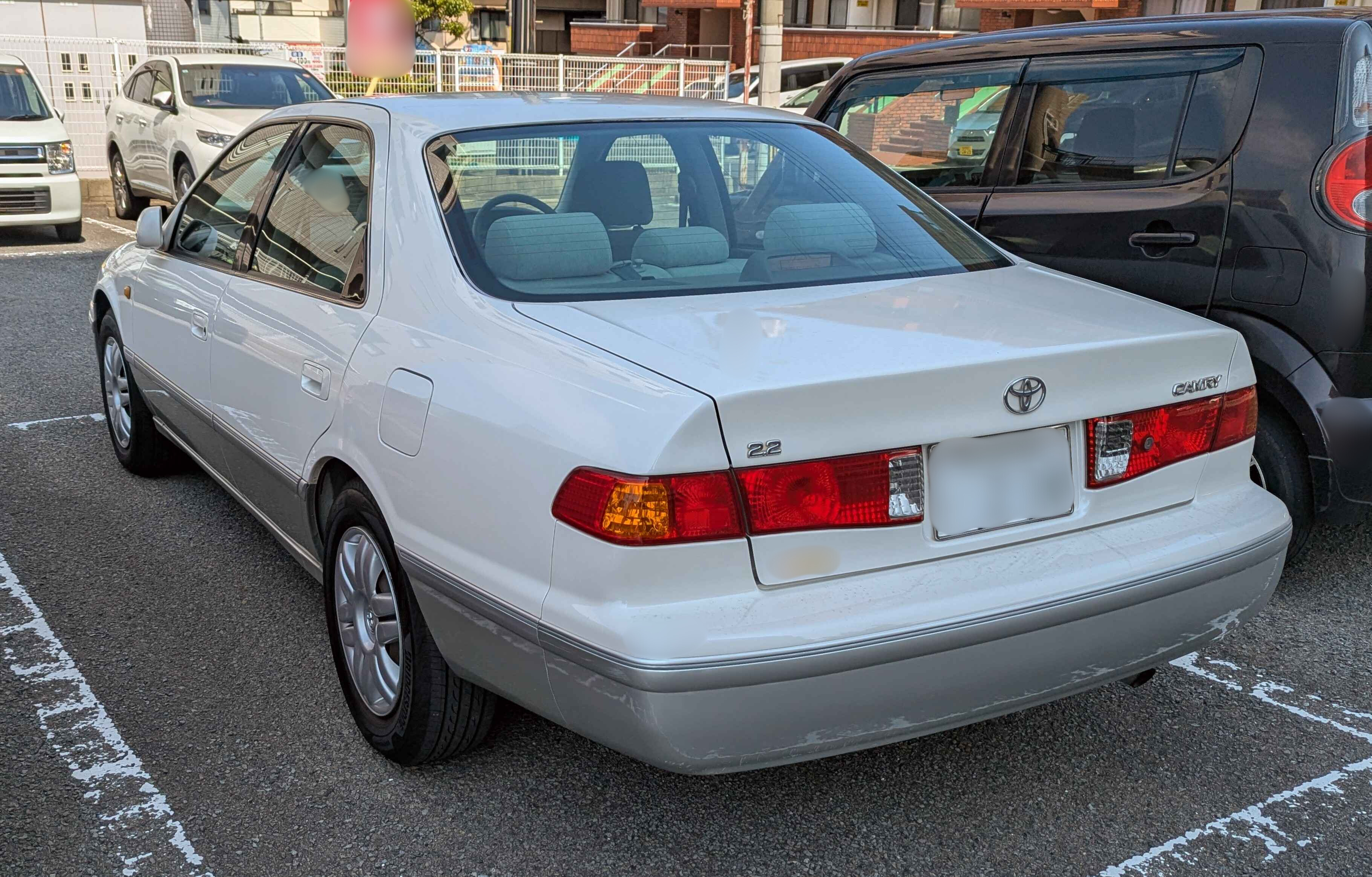
Rear view (facelift)

==== Mark II Qualis ====
The Mark II Qualis was introduced in 1997 as a direct replacement for the Mark II Wagon. It had no relation to the Mark II sedan (a rear-wheel drive executive car) besides the front and rear lights, which resembled those of the Mark II. The Mark II Qualis was also available in a 3.0G version, with the 3.0-liter 1MZ-FE V6 engine, not available on the Japanese market Camry. The Camry was sold only at Toyota Japanese dealerships called Toyota Corolla Store, while its twin the Mark II Qualis was exclusive to Toyopet Store locations.

The Mark II Qualis was only offered with front-wheel drive, which was the only front-wheel drive Mark II nameplate.

Sales ended in January 2002, and it was replaced by the Mark II Blit. Approximately 87,940 units were produced.

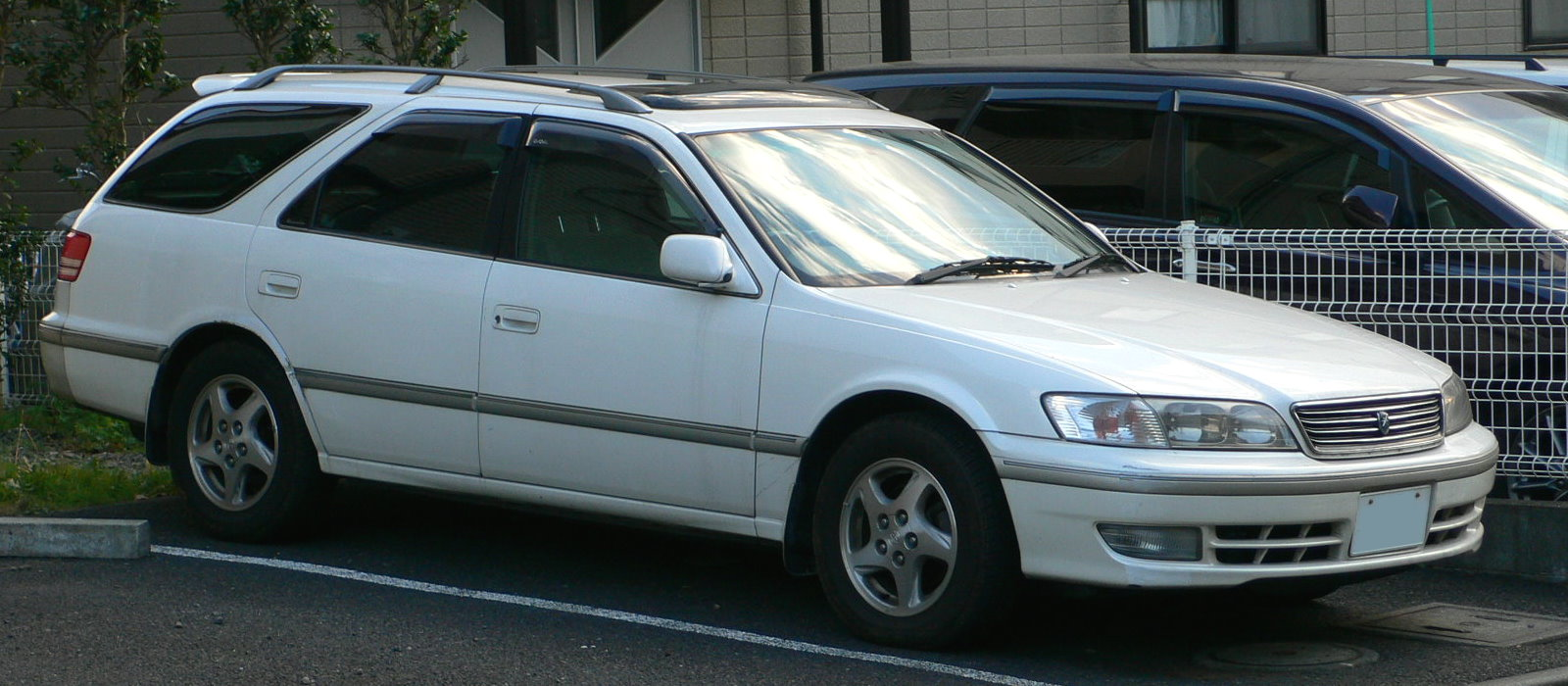
Mark II Qualis (pre-facelift)

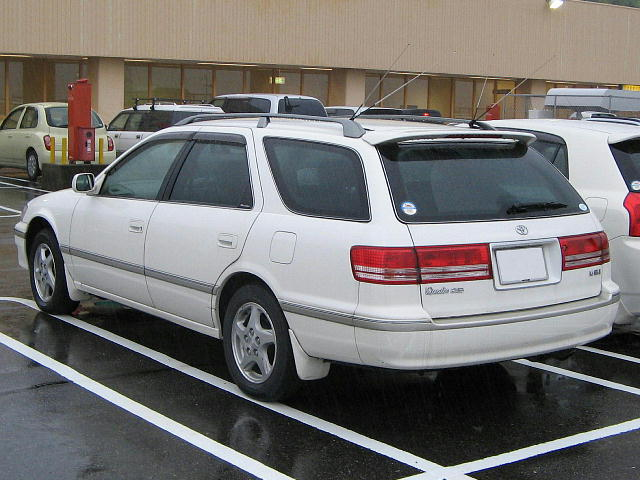
Rear view

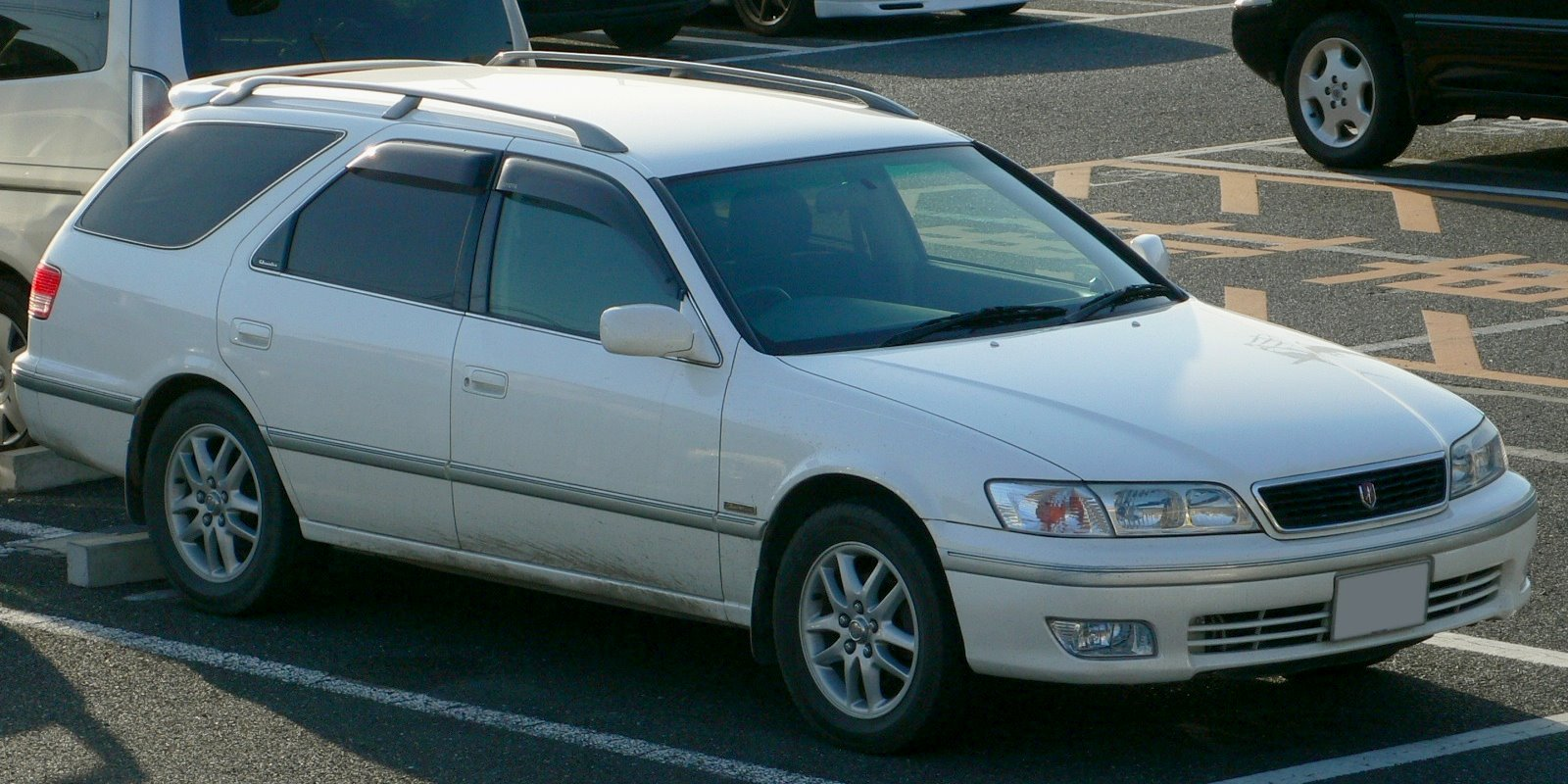
1999 facelift

==== Daihatsu Altis ====
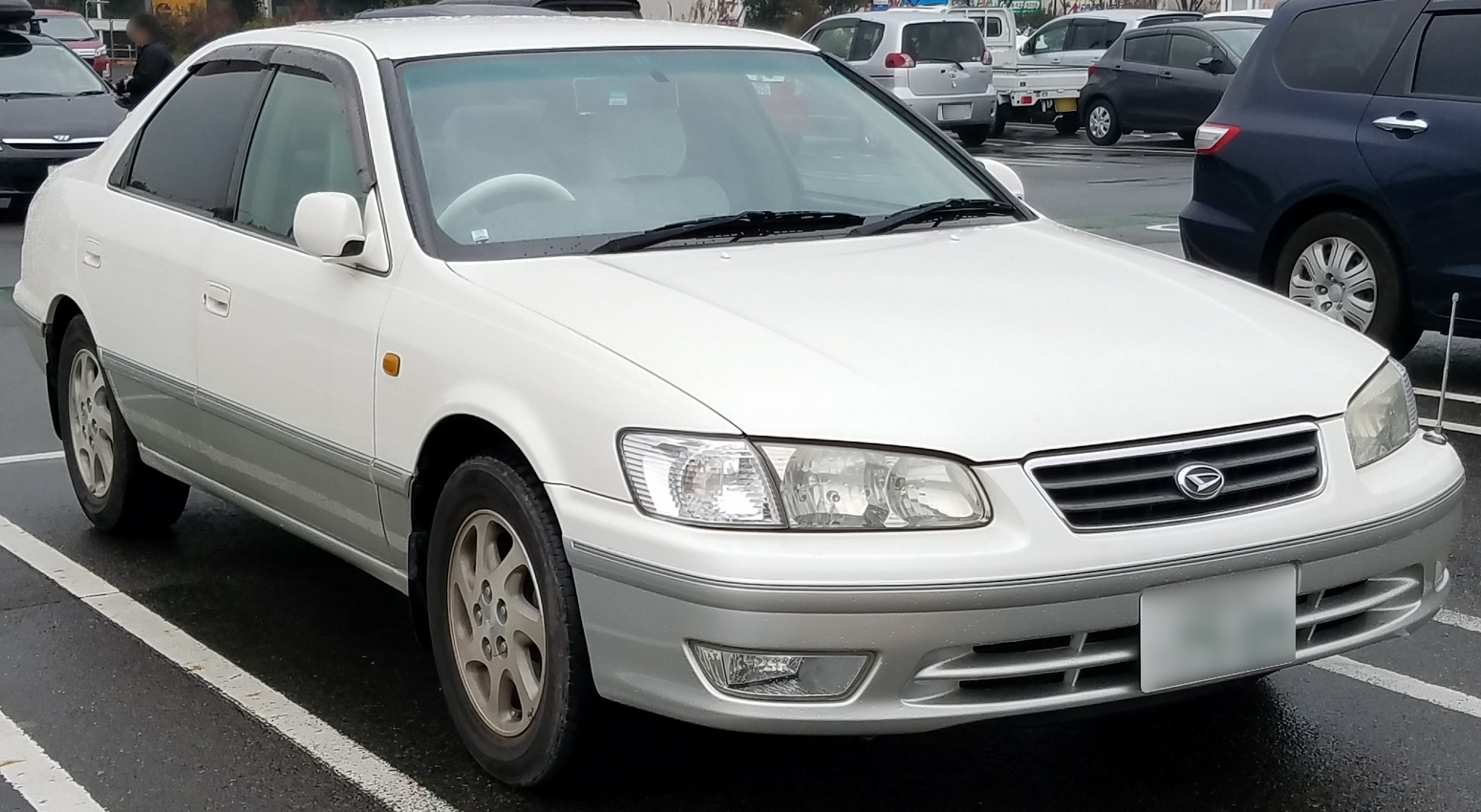
Facelift Daihatsu Altis (Japan)

An equivalent model was launched as the Daihatsu Altis. It was only sold in Japan and its production started from this generation. The Altis was introduced in March 2000 as a flagship sedan for Daihatsu as a replacement for the Daihatsu Applause. This is because a typical Daihatsu is priced in the entry level pricing range and the Altis was priced very similar to the comparable model Camry. The Altis was available with the 2.2-liter 5S-FE four-cylinder engine. Unlike the Camry which is available as a sedan or wagon in Japan, the Altis sold only as a sedan. The name "Altis" is a variation of the word "altitude", implying a "high elevation" status as the top-level car for Daihatsu.

Production the first-generation was discontinued in August 2001. Not very many Altis models were sold in Japan.

=== Australasia ===
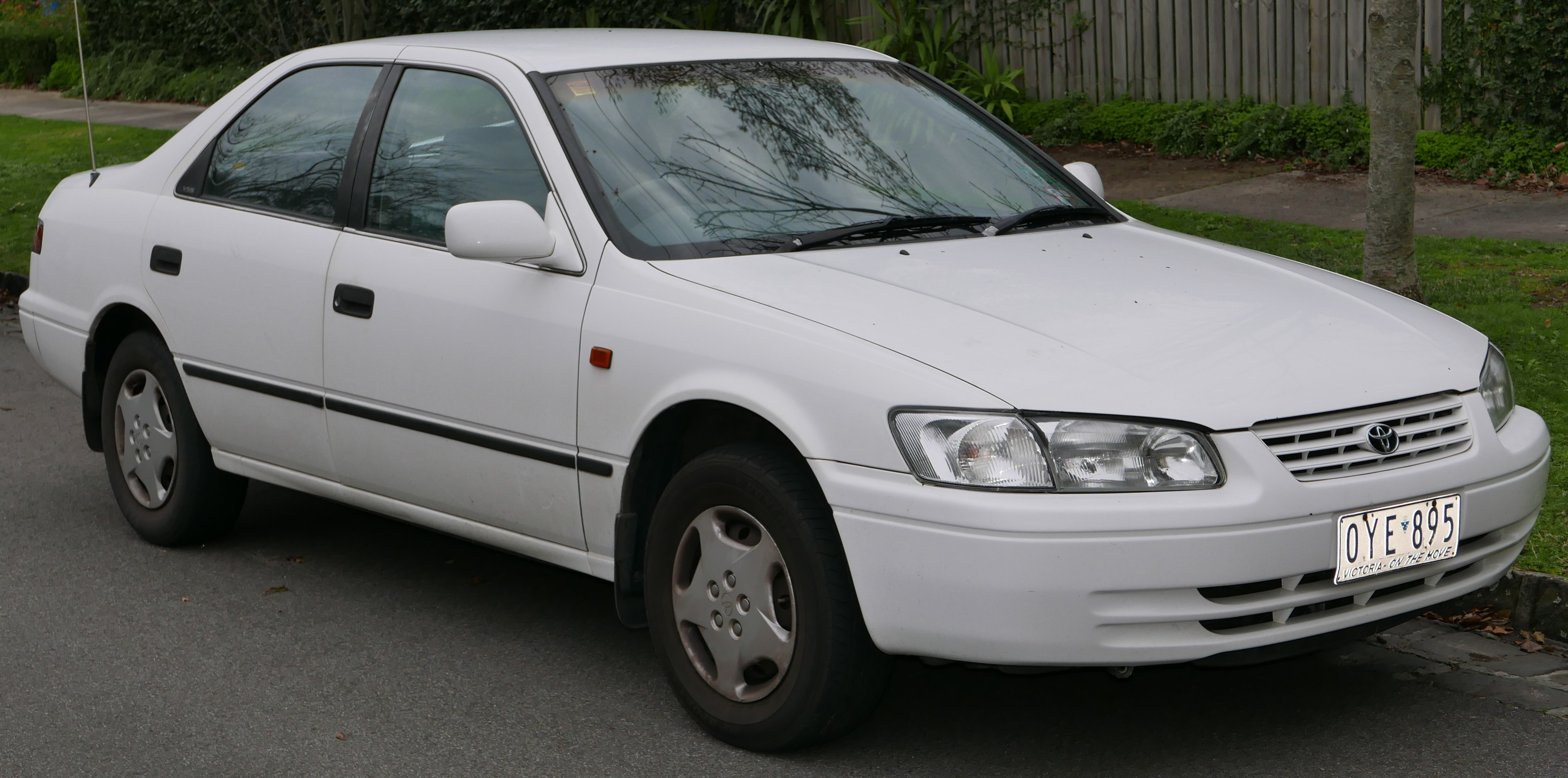

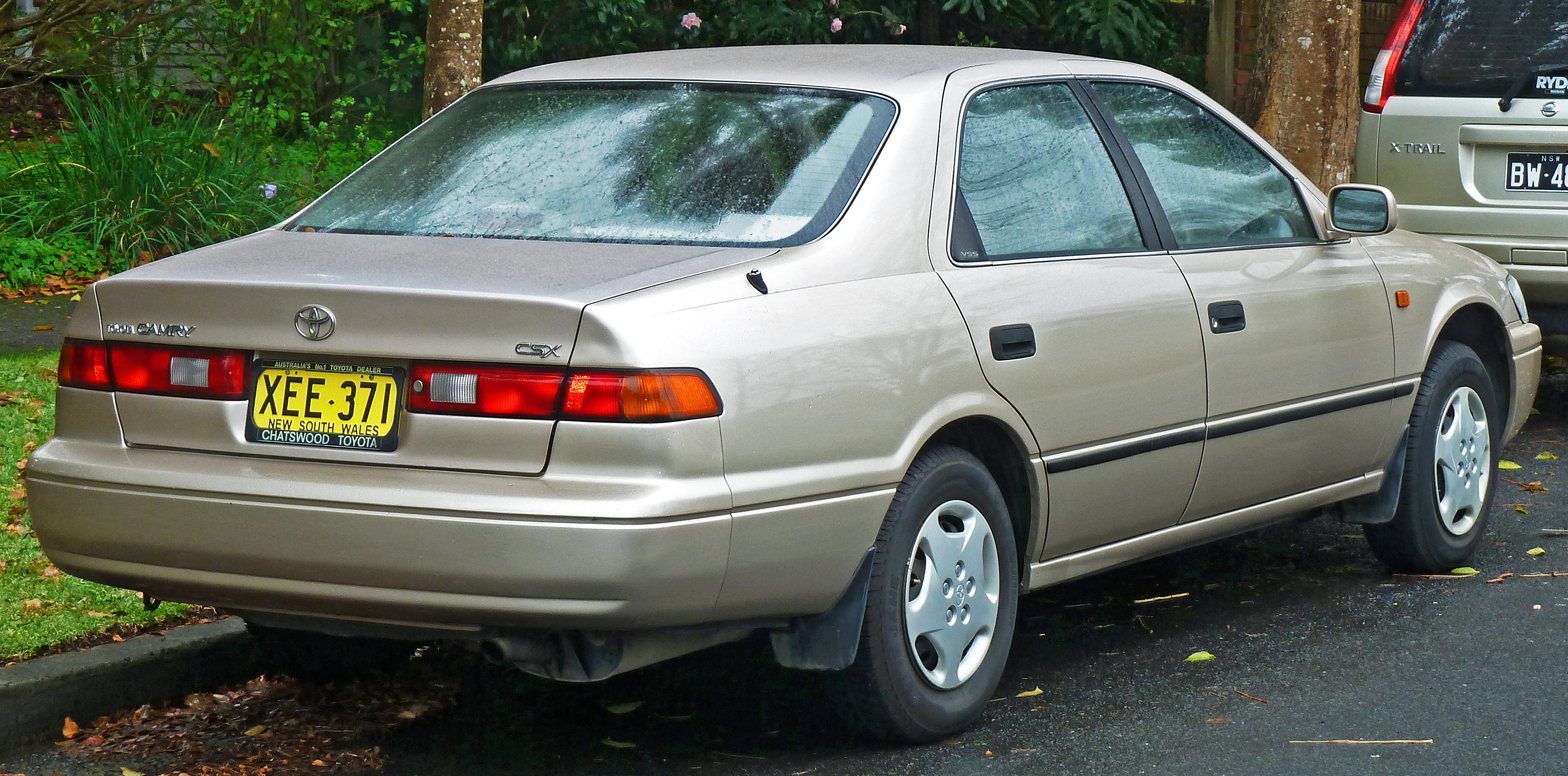
Pre-facelift Toyota Camry CSX sedan (SXV20R; Australia)

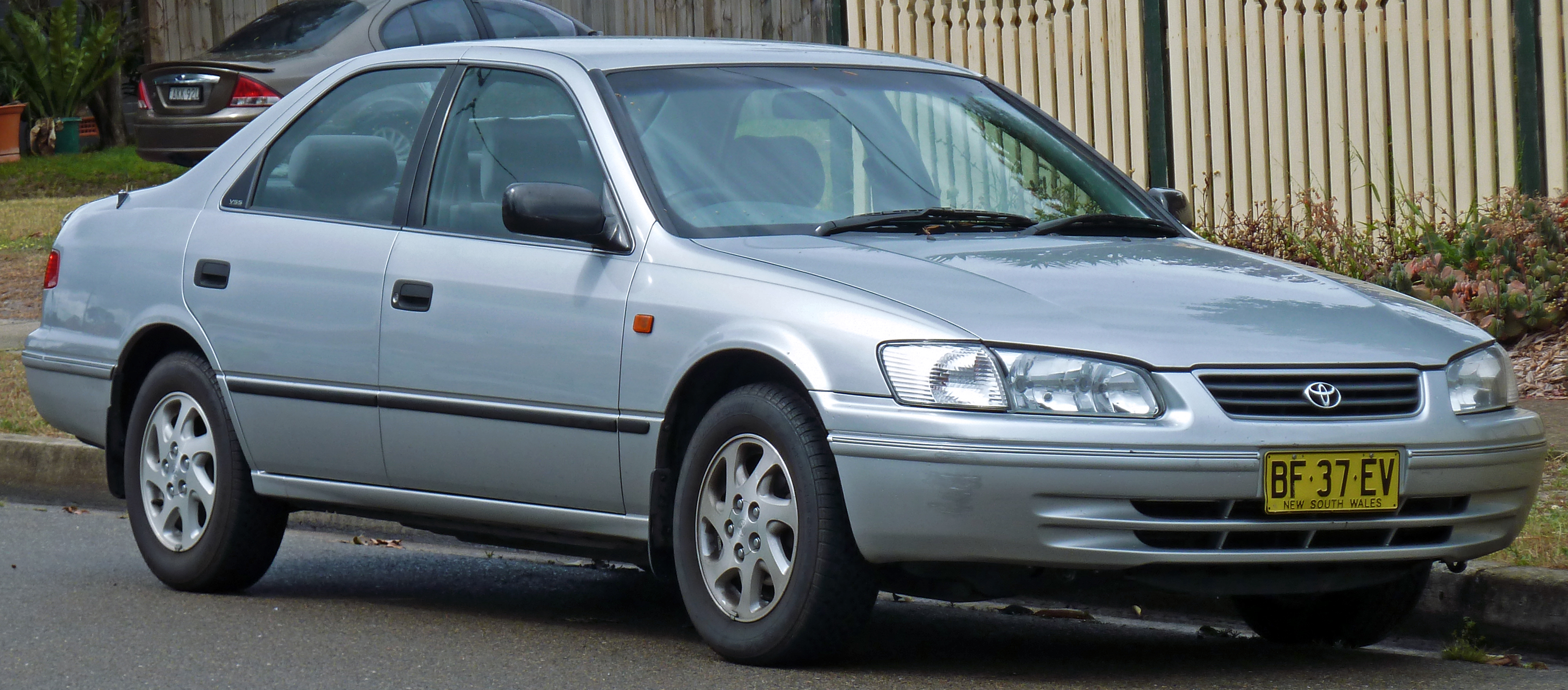
Facelift Toyota Camry Advantage sedan (SXV20R; Australia)

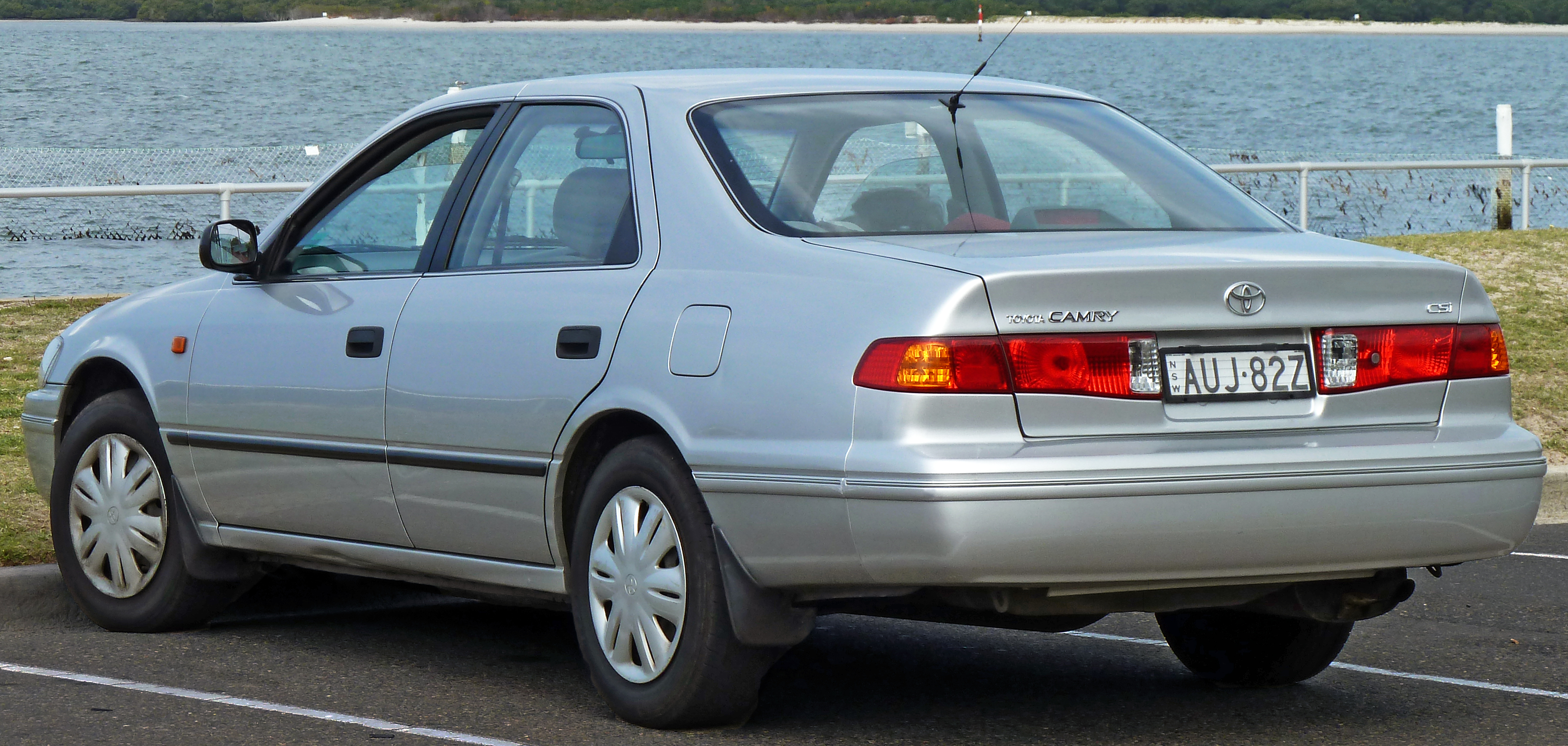
Facelift Toyota Camry CSi sedan (SXV20R; Australia)

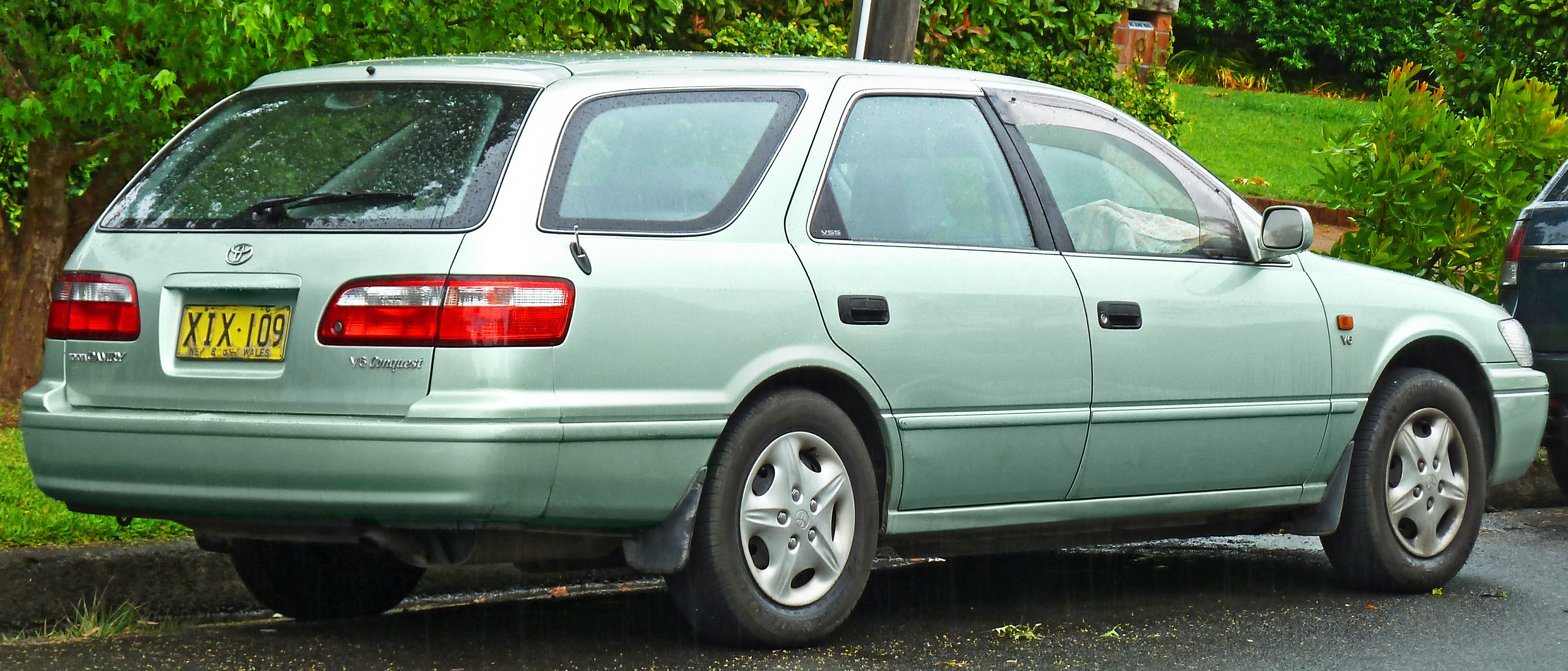
Facelift Toyota Camry Conquest wagon (MCV20R; Australia)

In Australia, unlike the previous generation, the Camry name was also applied to the V6 variants, while the Toyota Vienta V6 range was revised as the "upmarket" models. The line-up of four-cylinder Camry models consisted of the CSi, Conquest and CSX models (automatic transmission was standard on Conquest and CSX); all three variants were available in sedan or wagon body styles. The Camry V6 models consisted of CSi and Conquest, again as sedans and wagons, with the wagons only available with automatic transmission. The Camry V6 Touring sedan model was launched in March 1999.

The Vienta V6 line up consisted of VXi and Grande sedans and the VXi wagon. The Vienta VXi was similarly equipped to the four-cylinder Camry CSX.

In September 2000, the revised Camry was launched. The Vienta V6 range was discontinued due to the launch of the Avalon sedan in July 2000 and two new models were added to the Camry range: the top-of-the-range Azura V6 sedan and the Touring V6 wagon, both of which were available with an automatic transmission only. Towards the end of the model run, the limited edition Intrigue and Advantage sedans were launched.

Wheel sizes vary on this shape of Camry, with some using 14-inch wheels, while others use 15-inch.

New Zealand made a special edition of 10, TRD supercharged, 3.0 V6, 5 speed manual sedans called the Camry TS Supercharged. It produced 206 kW over the standard V6. This vehicle was a special edition put together by Toyota NZ. The suspension was tuned by former F1 driver Chris Amon and featured TS emblems on the cluster and on the leather seats. Amon also has input on many other Toyotas for the New Zealand market including the Corona and Corolla.

=== Middle East ===
For the Middle East market, the Camry was sourced from Australia. It was offered in three different trims as a sedan: the low-end XLI and mid-range GLI that both carried the four-cylinder engine—and the luxury Grande with V6 engine. The station wagon was also offered with the GLI trim.

=== North America ===
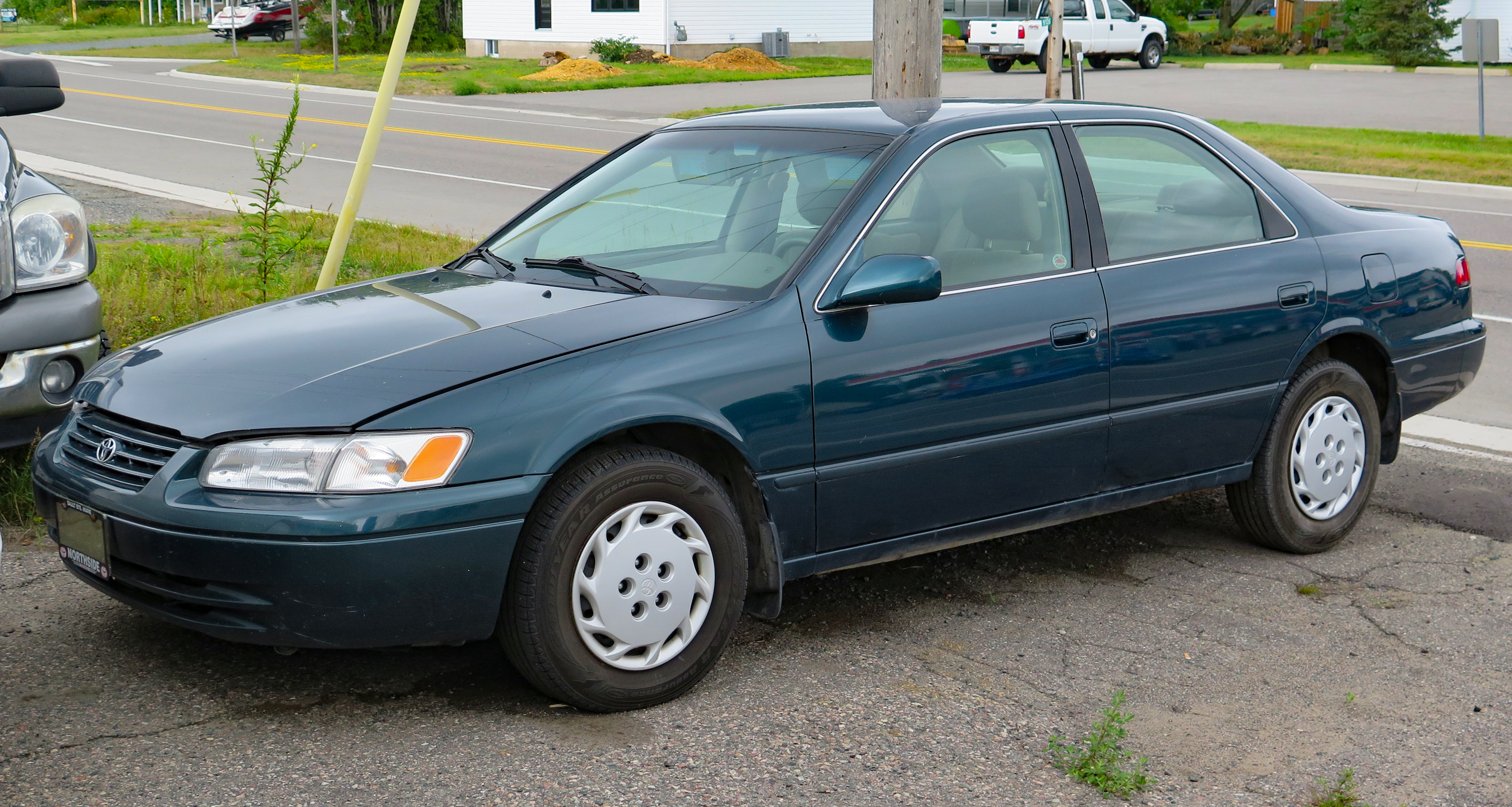
Pre-facelift Toyota Camry LE (SXV20, US)

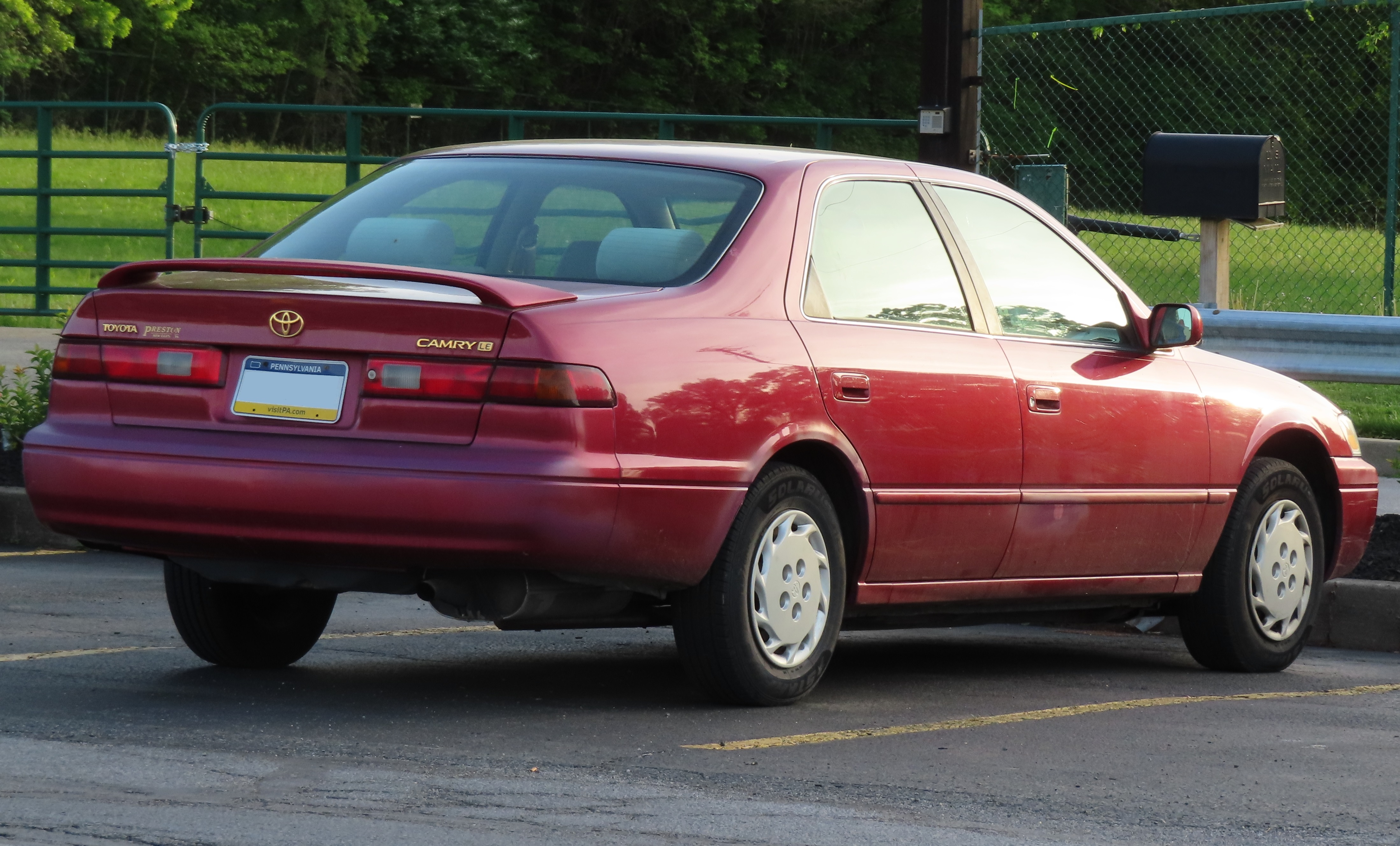
Pre-facelift Toyota Camry LE (SXV20, US) with optional rear spoiler.

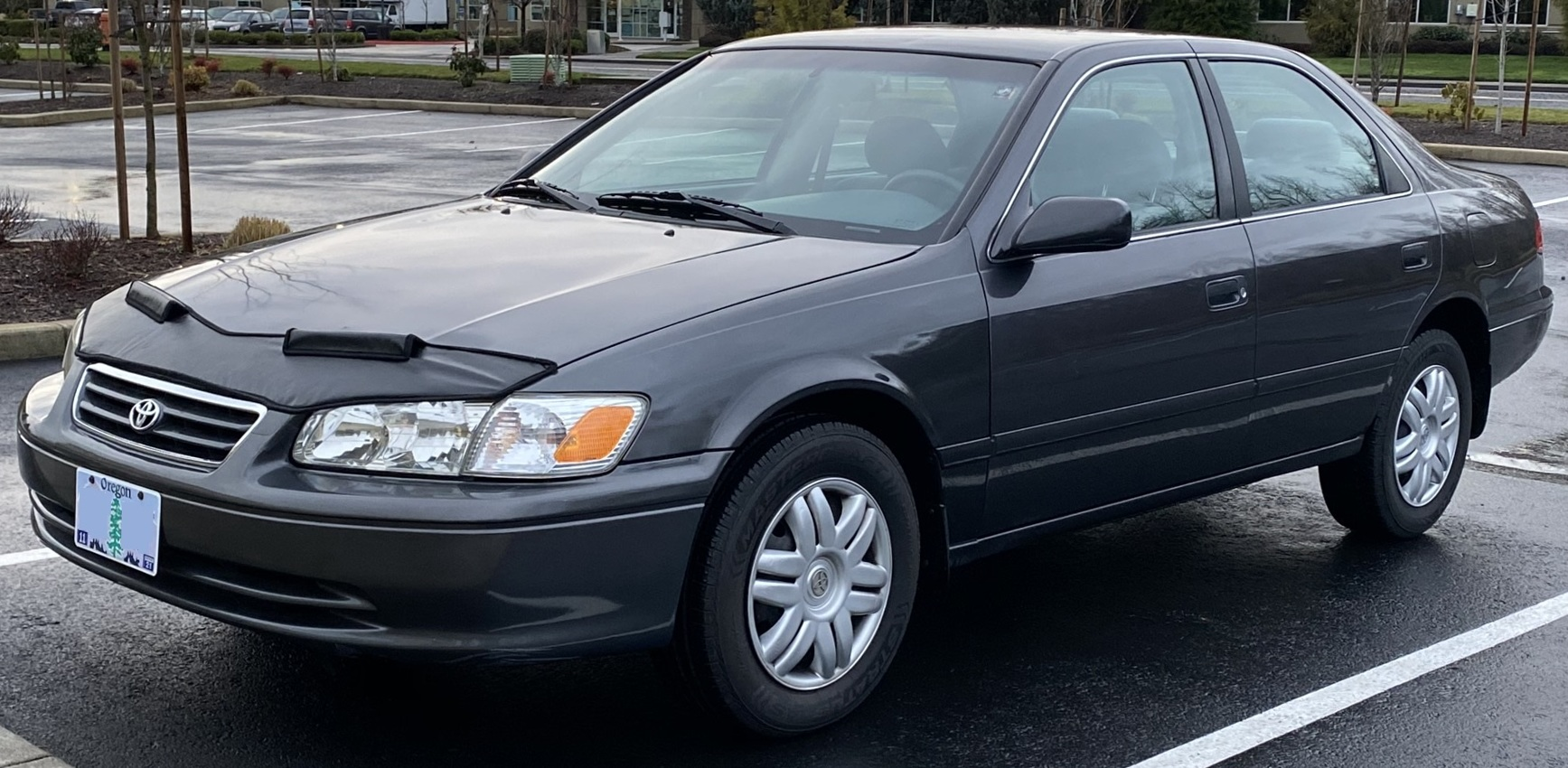
Facelift Toyota Camry V6 LE (MCV20, US) with optional hood mask.

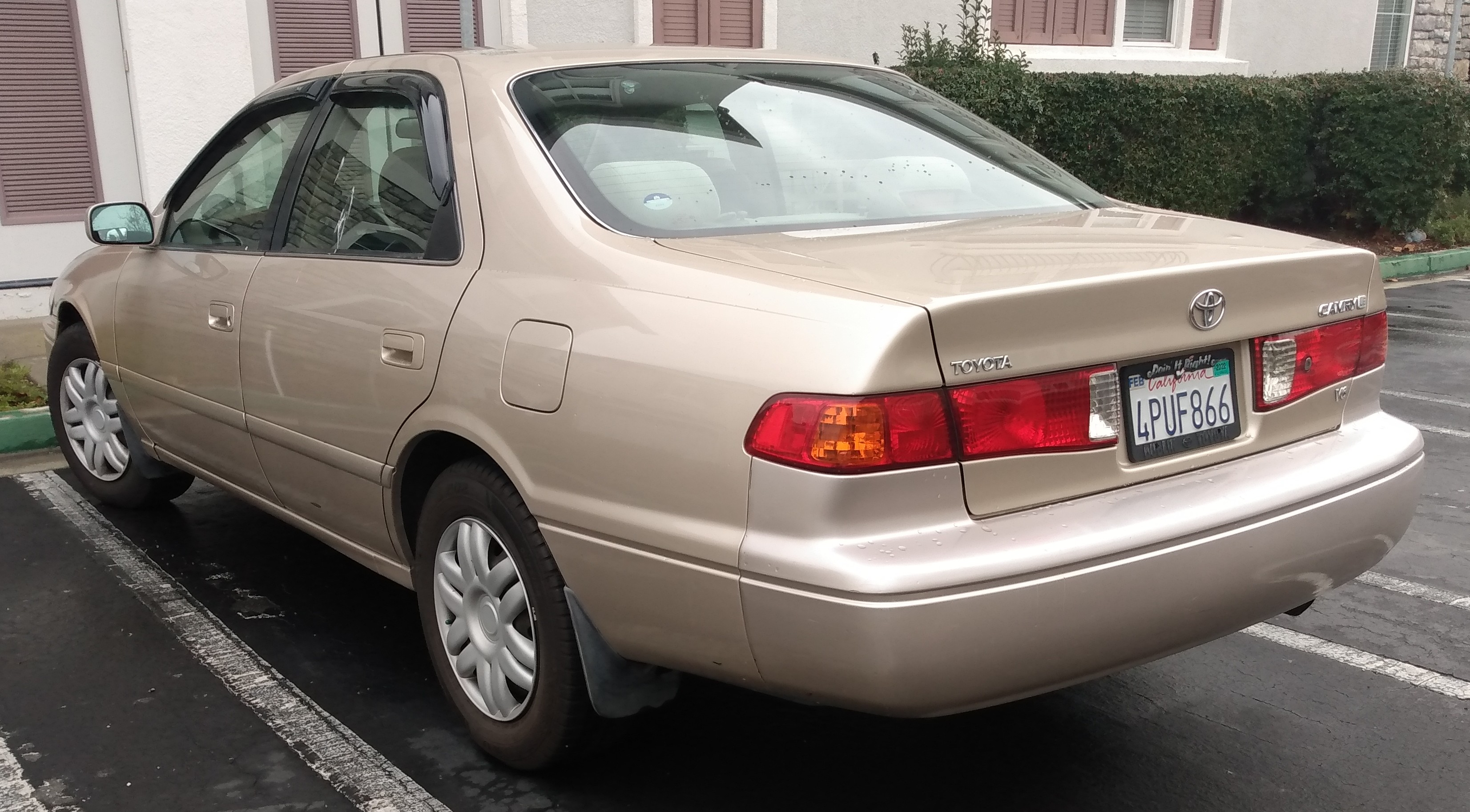
Facelift Toyota Camry V6 LE (MCV20, US)

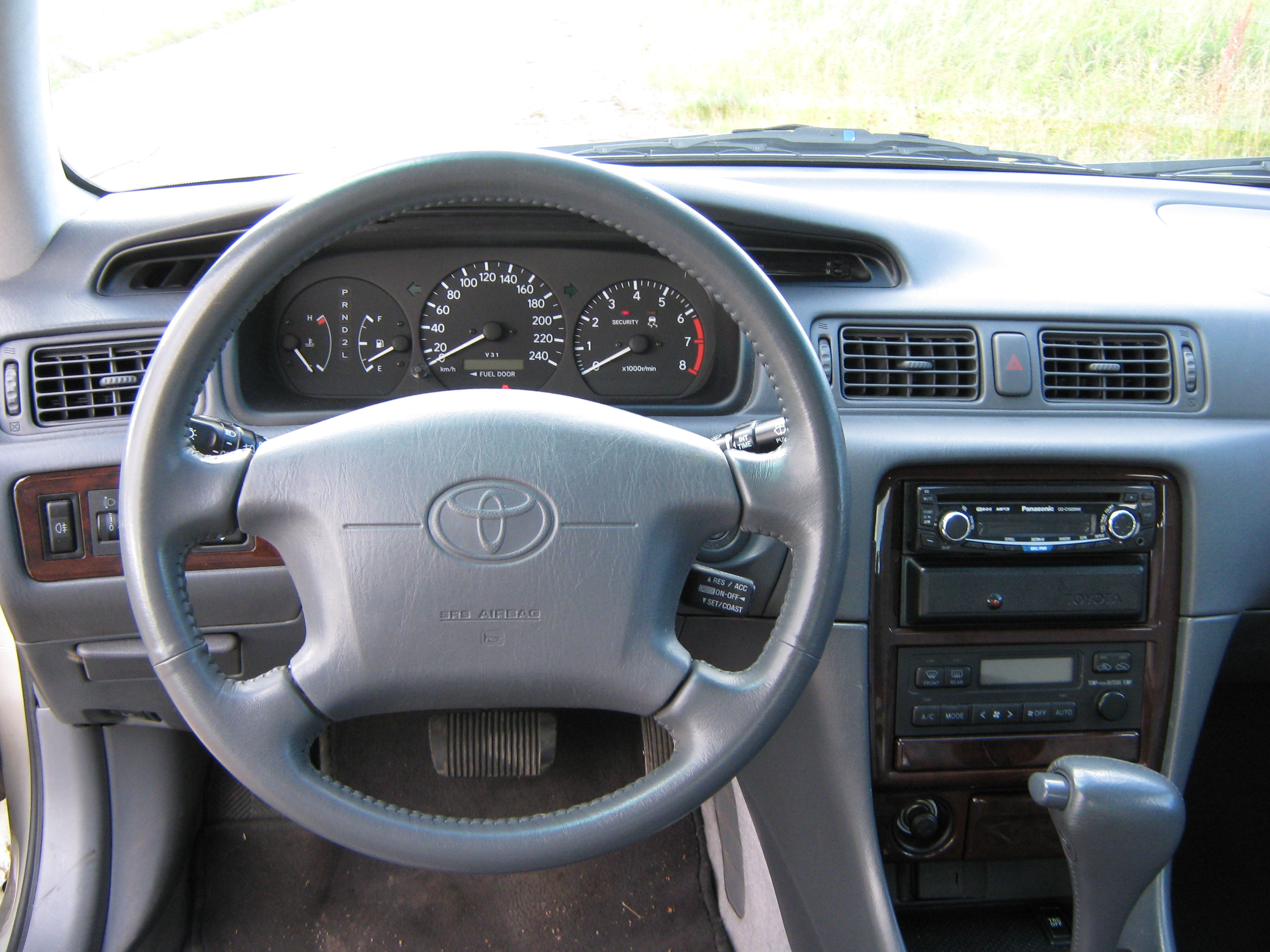
Interior

In the United States, the Camry SE was dropped and the base model was renamed the CE for the 1997 model year. Both the LE and the XLE trims were carried over from the previous generation. All trim levels were available with either the 2.2-liter inline-four or the 3.0-liter V6 engine. Manual transmission was initially only available on the V6 CE model. Toyota Racing Development (TRD) offered a supercharger kit for the V6 models, raising power to 247 hp (184 kW) and 242 lb⋅ft (328 N⋅m) of torque.

The Camry had a mild refresh in August 1999 for the 2000 model year, noticeably with restyled headlights, grille, wider side moldings, and bigger tail-lights. The CE with V6 engine was discontinued. The manual transmission was only offered for the CE and V6 LE.

Some of this generation Camry sold in the US were produced at TMMK as well as at the Tsutsumi plant in Japan. A Camry manufactured in Japan is denoted with a VIN starting with "JT2"; US-made models are denoted with a VIN starting with "4T1".

A coupe was added in 1998 for the 1999 model year and then a convertible in 1999 for the 2000 model year. In contrast to the coupe from the third-generation Camrys, the new two-door cars were given a separate nameplate, Toyota Camry Solara, or simply Solara. They were also a significant styling departure from the sedan. The Solara was available in SE and SLE trims, corresponding roughly to the sedan's LE and XLE trims.

In 1999, Toyota offered a four-cylinder, non-hybrid CNG-powered XV20 Camry in California to fleet customers.

The LE-based Gallery Edition and Collector Edition were new for 2001 model year.

Euro NCAP test results Camry 2.2 4-door saloon (1998)
Test	Score	Rating
Adult occupant:	25	4 /5 stars
Pedestrian:	15	2 /4 stars

The Camry V6 was again on Car and Driver magazine's Ten Best list for 1997.

The Insurance Institute for Highway Safety gave the Camry a "Good" overall score in their frontal offset crash test. Front seat-mounted side torso airbags were optional beginning on 1999 models.

=== Europe ===
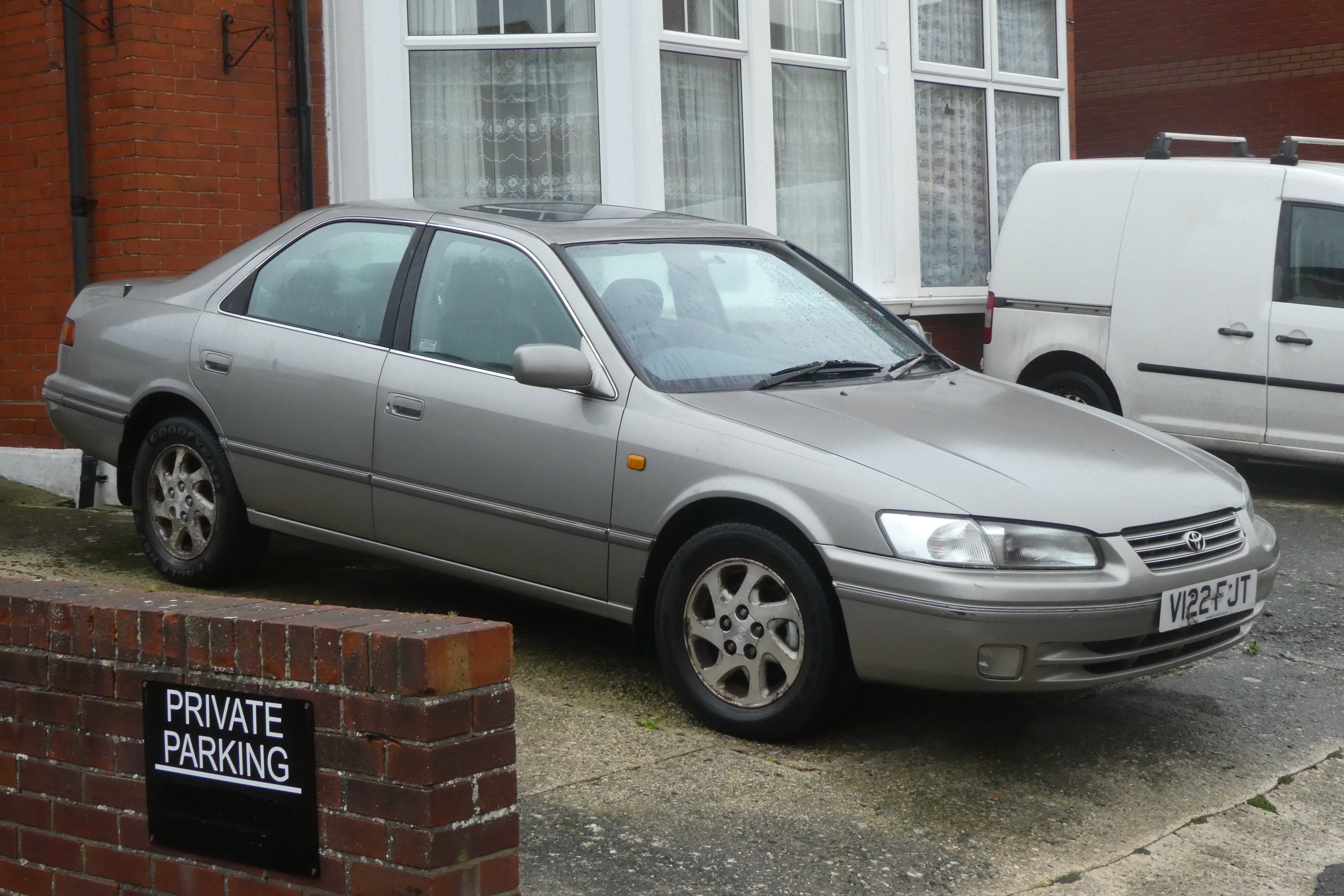
Pre-facelift Toyota Camry 3.0i V6 GX (MCV20) in the UK.

The XV20 was also sold in Europe. But like its predecessor, the Camry XV10, the range was a lot more limited. As before, models for the European market continued to be imported from Japan.

Launched in 1997, the range consisted of the 2.2i GL and 3.0i GX models in sedan form only. Like the Camry XV10, the GX was only available with an automatic transmission. The 2.2i GL was available with both manual and automatic transmissions.

The Camry received a four out of five star safety rating in Euro NCAP's test, due to its side airbags.
