= Toyota Camry Solara =

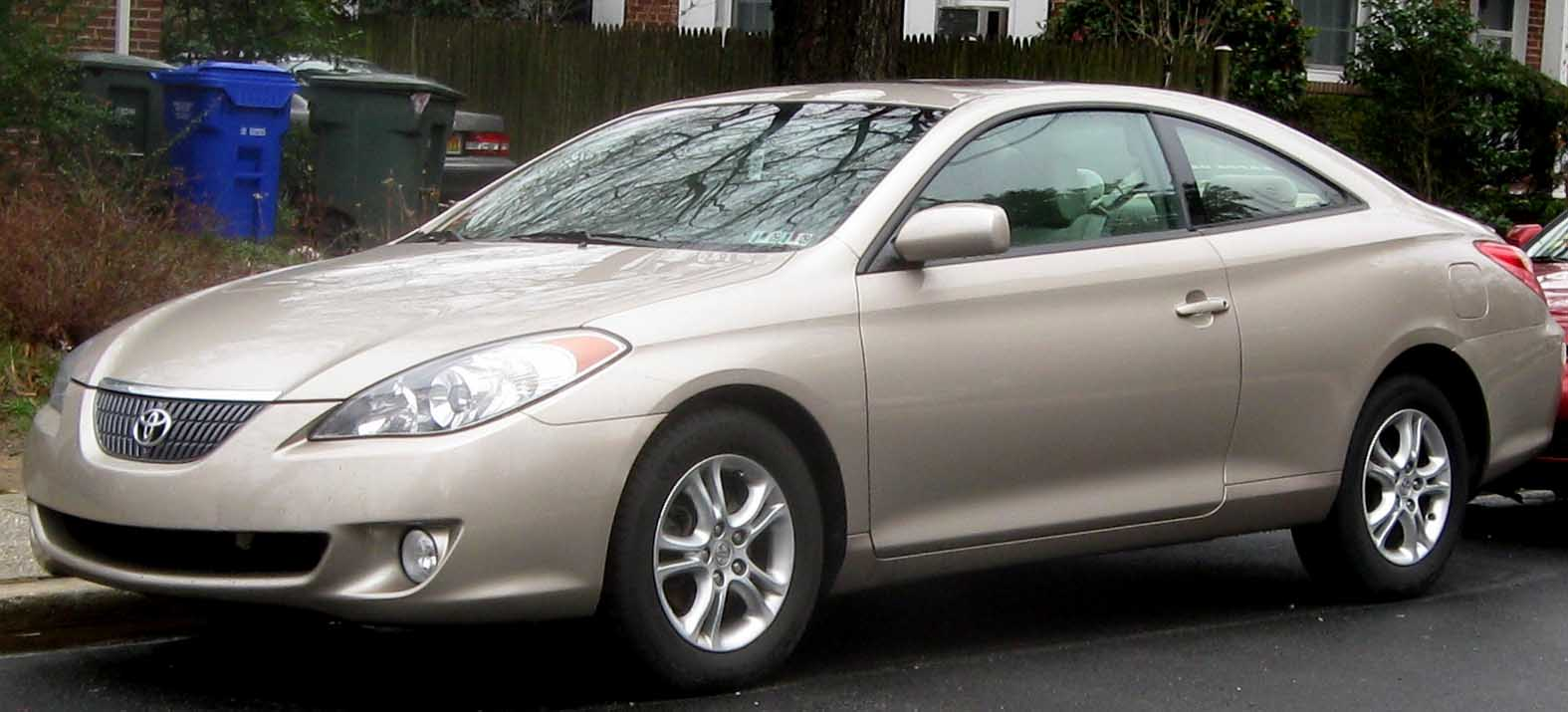

Overview
- Manufacturer: Toyota
- Also called: Toyota Solara
- Production: 1998–2008
- Model years: 1999–2008

Body and chassis
- Class: Mid-size car
- Body style: 2-door coupé; 2-door convertible
- Layout: Front-engine, front-wheel-drive
- Related: Toyota Camry

Chronology
- Predecessor: Toyota Camry coupé (XV10)

The Toyota Camry Solara, popularly known as the Toyota Solara, is a mid-size coupé/convertible built by Toyota. The Camry Solara is mechanically based on the Toyota Camry and effectively replaced the discontinued Camry Coupé (XV10); however, in contrast with its predecessor's conservative design, the Camry Solara was designed with a greater emphasis on sportiness, with more rakish styling, and uprated suspension and engine tuning intended to provide a sportier feel. The coupe was launched in late 1998 for model year 1999. In 2000, the convertible was introduced, effectively replacing the Celica convertible in Toyota's North American lineup.

The second-generation Camry Solara debuted in 2003 for model year 2004, initially offered as a coupe; the second-generation convertible was introduced in the spring of 2004 as a 2005 model. Coupe production ended in mid-2008. Despite official statements that the convertible might be sold until 2010 if demand was sufficient, production was suspended in December 2008 and never resumed.

== First generation (XV20; 1998–2003) ==
First generation and Mark V (XV20)
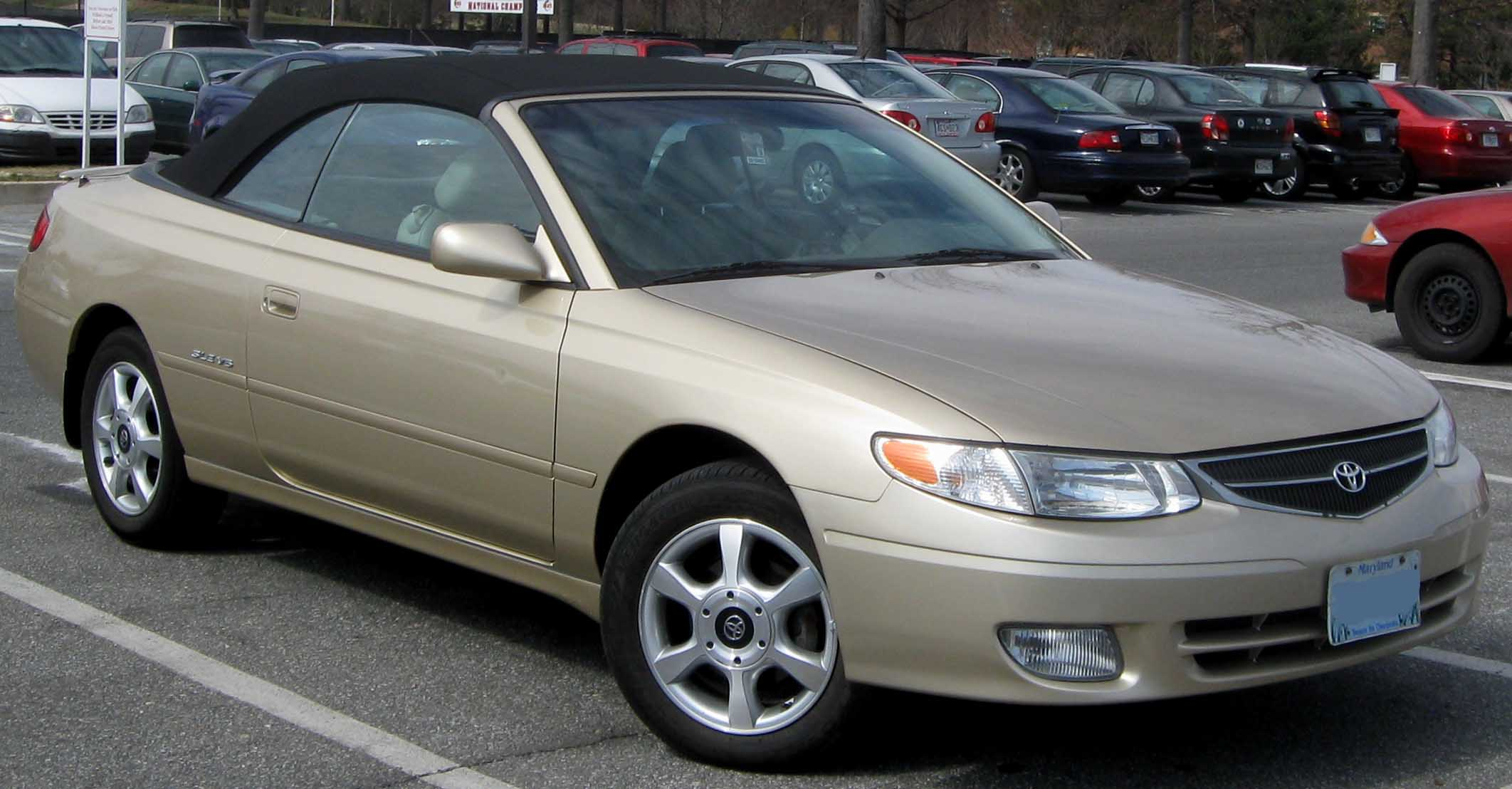

Overview
- Production: June 1998 – June 2003
- Model years: 1999–2003
- Assembly: Canada: Cambridge, Ontario (TMMC)
- Designer: Warren J. Crain (1995)

Body and chassis
- Related: Toyota Camry (XV10); Toyota Camry (XV20); Lexus ES/Toyota Windom (XV20)

Powertrain
- Engine: 2.2 L 5S-FE I4 (SXV20); 2.4 L 2AZ-FE I4 (ACV20); 3.0 L 1MZ-FE V6 (MCV20)
- Transmission: 5-speed manual I4 S51, V6 E153; 4-speed automatic I4 A140E, V6 A541E

Dimensions
- Wheelbase: 105.1 in (2,670 mm)
- Length: 1999–2001: 190 in (4,826 mm); 2002–03: 191.5 in (4,864 mm)
- Width: 71.1 in (1,806 mm)
- Height: 1999–2001: 55.1 in (1,400 mm); 2002–03 Coupe: 54.3 in (1,379 mm); 2002–03 Convertible: 55.5 in (1,410 mm)

Chronology
- Predecessor: Toyota Camry coupé (XV10)

The Solara was created to appeal to a demographic of more sport-minded drivers than those who prefer the Toyota Camry sedan, while still needing "room and comfort." The Camry Solara thus aspired to blend "sporty" looks and style with spacious practicality. Prior to the production of the Camry Solara, the 2-door version of the Toyota Camry was simply known as the Camry Coupe. It was added to the third generation Camry lineup in 1993 for model year 1994 to compete with the Honda Accord and other cars in its class. However, due to it never being nearly as popular as the 4-door sedan of the Camry, the Camry Coupe was dropped in 1996 when the sedan was redesigned for model year 1997. A distinct successor went into development in the mid-1990s, resulting a winning design entry in 1995 from Warren J. Crain of Calty Design and Research. After design approval, production development ran from 1995 to the first half of 1998. Patents were filed at the Japan Patent Office on January 18, 1996, under 1020408 and November 14, 1996, at the United States Patent Office USPTO under D407350.

The first generation Camry Solara went on sale in the third quarter of 1998 as a 1999 model to replace the Camry Coupe. It was based on the mechanical platform of the previous generation XV10 Toyota Camry and was built at the TMMC facilities in Cambridge, Ontario, Canada. This model featured a 2.2-liter four-cylinder engine with 136 hp (101 kW) and 150 lb⋅ft (203 N⋅m) of torque at 4,400 rpm, and a 3.0-liter V6 engine with 200 hp (149 kW) at 5,200 rpm, and 214 lb⋅ft (290 N⋅m) of torque at 4,400 rpm. The engines are the same as the ones used in the fourth generation Camry, but slightly revamped to have a small gain in power (two and six horsepower, respectively). The V6 claimed a 0-to-60 mph (97 km/h) time of 7.1 seconds.

Toyota offered dealer-installed performance upgrades for the first-generation Solara under the Toyota Racing Development (TRD) banner. The upgrades included stiffer shock absorbers and anti-roll bars, a less restrictive muffler, a "tasteful" body kit, larger wheels with high-performance tires, and a supercharger that increased the power of the V6 engine by a claimed 62 hp (46 kW). The parts were covered under a TRD warranty and provided a substantial increase in performance; Motor Trend found that the 0-to-60 mph (97 km/h) acceleration time of the V6 Solara decreased to 5.6 seconds with the full TRD package.

The Toyota Camry Solara is also the first vehicle in the Toyota lineup, after their 1997 partnership agreement, to feature a JBL premium stereo option. All models came with a single-slot in-dash CD player and cassette deck from JBL. The SE models come standard with 15-inch steel wheels and hubcaps, upgradable to 15-inch alloy wheels. The Sports Package also adds a retuned suspension, perforated leather-wrapped steering wheel, perforated eight-way power-adjustable leather seats, an upgrade to 16-inch alloy wheels, retuned steering, minor trim changes and a rear lip spoiler.

In 2000, the SE and SLE convertibles were added to the lineup; these cars were built as semi-finished coupes, shipped to an American Sunroof Company (ASC) facility where the roofs were removed and convertible tops installed, and were then shipped back to Toyota for painting and final assembly. Claiming that the car's basic structure was designed for this treatment, Toyota made no suspension changes from the coupe. Toyota did strengthen the rocker sections by doubling them up, while adding steel bracing between the wheel wells, adding 171 lb (78 kg) over the coupe's weight. Nonetheless, the car was considerably less rigid than the coupe.

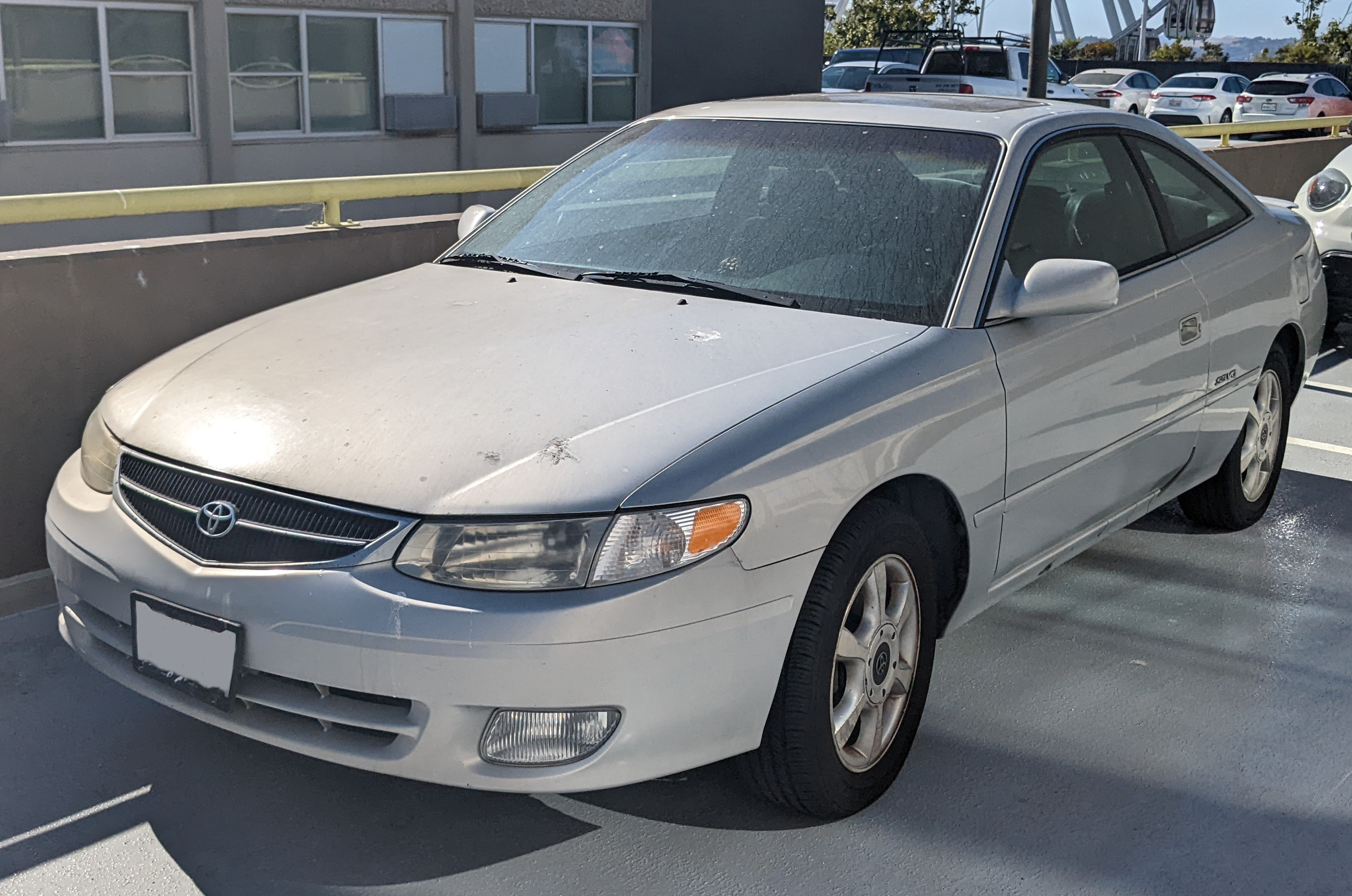
Toyota Camry Solara Coupe (Pre-Facelift)

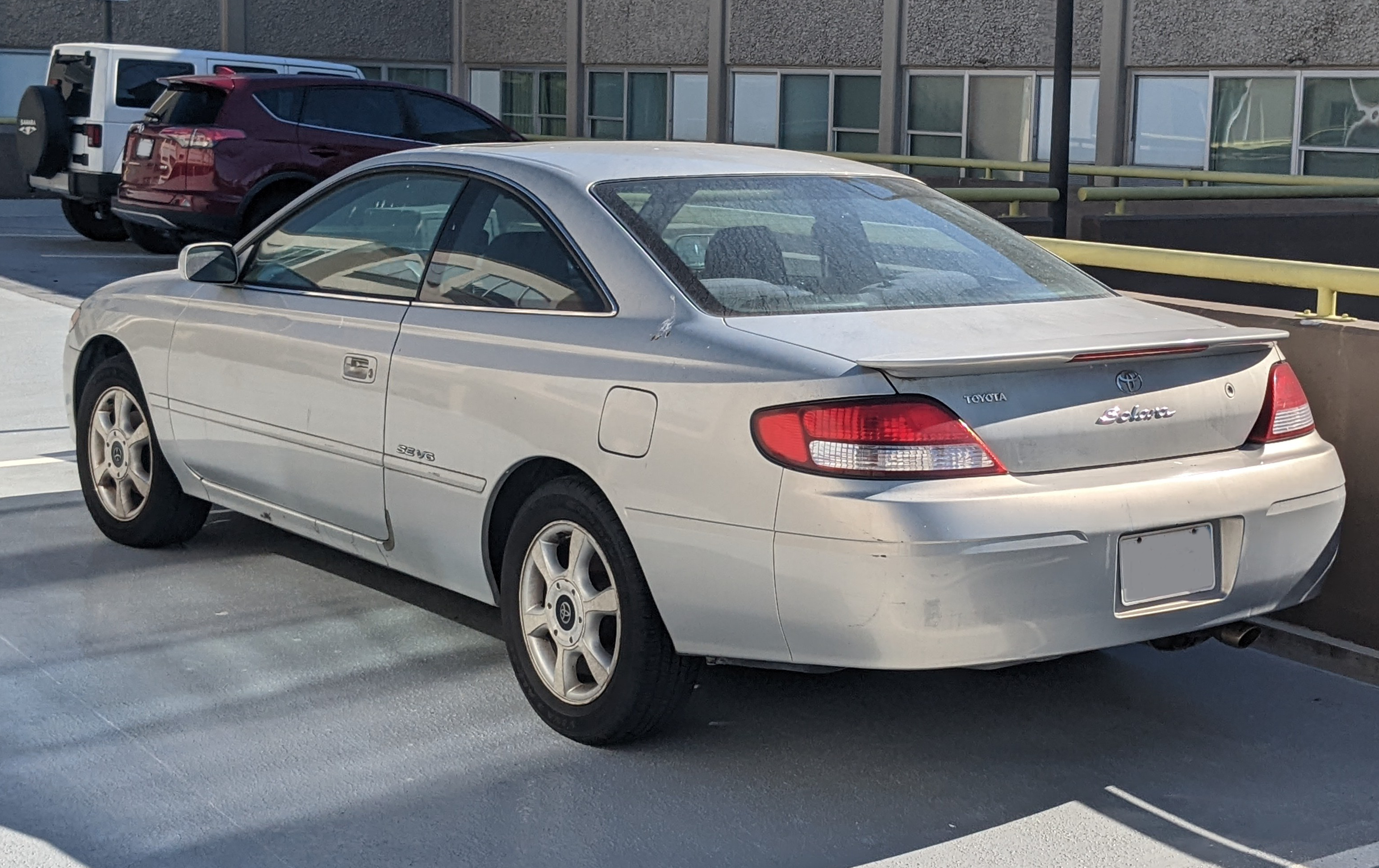
Toyota Camry Solara Coupe (Pre-Facelift) – Rear

=== Minor model update (2001–2003) ===
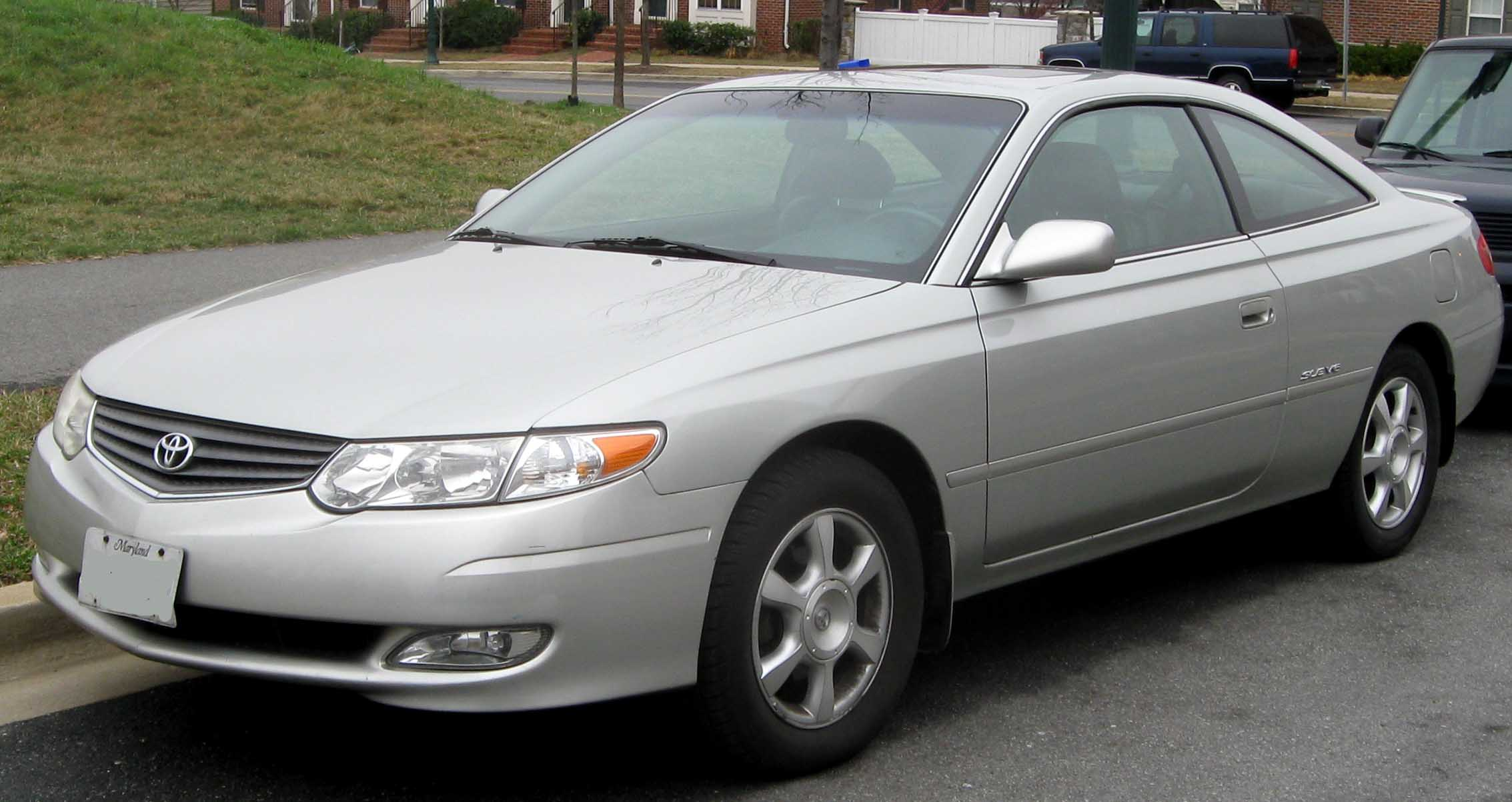
2002–2003 Toyota Solara SLE coupe

The Camry Solara was lightly facelifted in September 2001 for the 2002 model year, receiving changes to the grille pattern, taillights, headlights that now featured a 4-bulb system instead of 2, a chrome logo on the steering wheel (instead of an embossed pattern), and smaller fog lights. The trunk was now openable by remote and the wood trim changed from Oxford Burlwood to Mustard Wood. New packages and options were also offered and include heated leather seats, an Appearance Package that featured a three-spoke steering wheel, leather-wrapped shift knob, black pearl emblems, and a different center cap on the wheels.

Mechanically, the 2.2-liter four-cylinder engine was replaced with the same 2.4-liter four-cylinder engine offered on the redesigned 2002 Camry, the 2AZ-FE. This new engine was chosen because it featured the same gas mileage as the previous engine, except it offered more power and the addition of VVT-i, a technology that improved performance and reduced emissions. This new engine featured 157 hp (117 kW) at 5,600 rpm, and 162 lb⋅ft (220 N⋅m) of torque at 4,000 rpm, up 22 hp (16 kW) from the previous model.

== Second generation (XV30; 2003–2008) ==
Second generation (XV30)
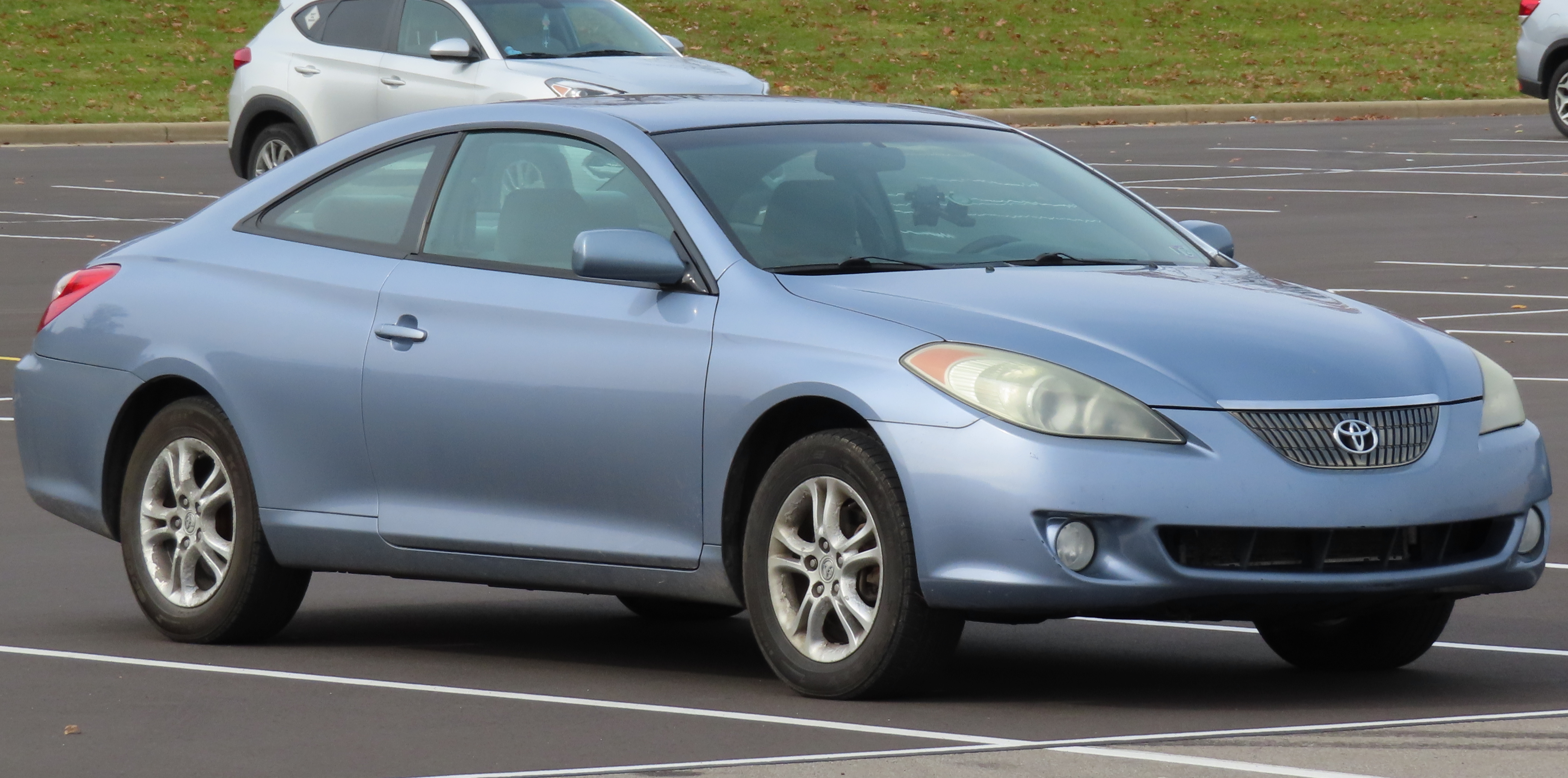
- 2006 Toyota Solara SE coupe

Overview
- Production: July 2003 – December 2008
- Model years: 2004–2008
- Assembly: United States: Georgetown, Kentucky (TMMK)
- Designer: Noboyuki Kato (2001)

Body and chassis
- Platform: Toyota K platform
- Related: Toyota Camry (XV30); Lexus ES/Toyota Windom (XV30)

Powertrain
- Engine: 2.4 L 2AZ-FE I4 (ACV30); 3.3 L 3MZ-FE V6 (MCV30)
- Transmission: 5-speed manual E351; 4-speed automatic U241E; 5-speed automatic U151E

Dimensions
- Wheelbase: 107.1 in (2,720 mm)
- Length: 192.5 in (4,890 mm)
- Width: 71.5 in (1,816 mm)
- Height: Coupe: 56.1 in (1,425 mm); Convertible: 56.5 in (1,435 mm)

The second generation of the Solara was completely redesigned (design approval in 2001; JPO patent number 1218292) and introduced to the public in August 2003 for the 2004 model year and featured a curvier body, with the option of adding XM radio and/or a navigation system. Based on the platform of the 2002 Camry sedan, the Gen 2 body is heavier than the Gen 1.5 body. The four-cylinder engine was carried over from the previous generation, while the optional V6 was a new 3.3 L unit rated at 225 net hp at 5,600 rpm (168 kW) and 240 lb⋅ft (325 N⋅m) of torque at 3,600 rpm. The four-cylinder engine could be coupled to a five-speed manual or four-speed automatic transmission, while the V6 was offered only with a five-speed U151E automatic transmission. Both engines featured Toyota's VVT-i technology.

The Solara moved to Toyota Motor Manufacturing Kentucky for the second generation model. Production started in July 2003 for the coupe and February 2004 for the convertible. The convertible was offered only with the 3.3 liter V-6 and the 5-speed MMT automatic transmission. Rather than being adapted from the coupe like the first-generation car—which had been criticized for poor structural rigidity—Toyota claimed that the second-generation convertible was specifically designed and built as such, with a more rigid body structure for decreased levels of noise and vibration.

In late 2005 for the 2006 model year, the five-speed MMT automatic transmission replaced the four-speed automatic on four-cylinder models, and minor changes were made to the optional power driver's seat.

In June 2006, a restyled 2007 Solara was introduced, with new LED tail lights, a revised rear bumper, and a redesigned front fascia. Interior changes include Optitron gauges, blue backlighting in the rest of the car's controls, a new steering wheel design that is somewhat similar to the recently revised Camry SE's steering wheel, revised shifter, MP3 and WMA CD playback capability, external audio device (e.g. iPod, Zen, cassette) auxiliary port connectivity, Bluetooth connectivity, and voice-activated navigation on the SLE V6 models. Powertrains were unchanged, although new SAE-Certified testing methods resulted in the 4-cylinder model being rated at 155 hp (116 kW) with 158 lb⋅ft (214 N⋅m) of torque, while the V6 was now rated at 210 hp (157 kW) and 220 lb⋅ft (298 N⋅m) of torque.

The second-generation Solara sold below expectations, as the market for large sedan-based coupes and convertibles was shrinking, and the car had inherited unexciting handling from its Camry parent. Despite the structural redesign, the convertible was still criticized for soft handling that did not feel sporty, and for significant body shake. From model year 2005 to 2008, sales fell from roughly 50,000 units annually to just over 20,000. After the 2008 model year, the coupe was discontinued due to faltering sales, but the convertible, which accounted for the majority of units sold, continued to be produced.

Despite statements that the convertible might be sold until at least 2010, production was quietly suspended in December 2008, with sales continuing from inventory to gauge demand. In June 2009, Toyota announced that sales had not met expectations, and that production would not resume.

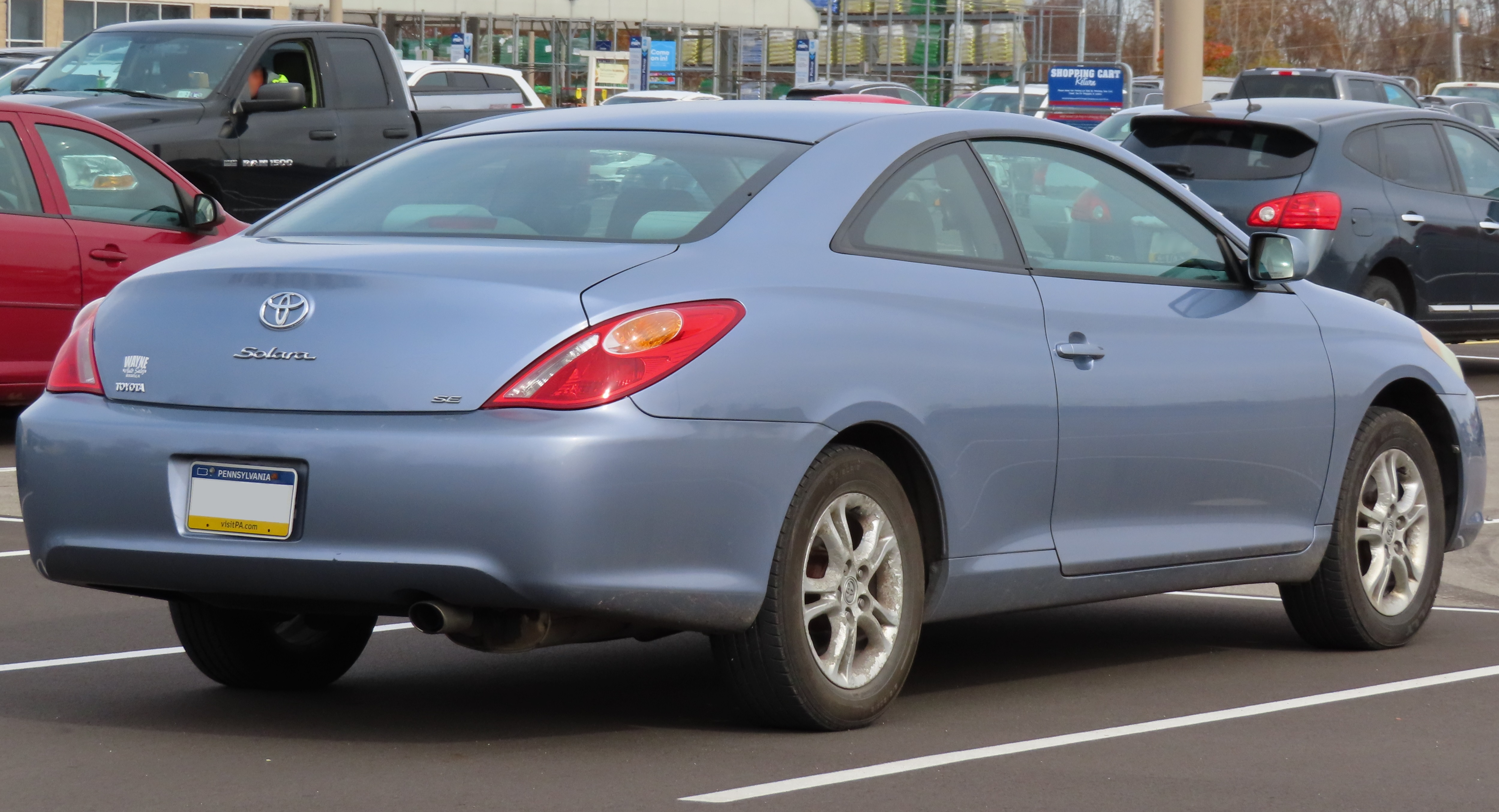
2006 SE coupe

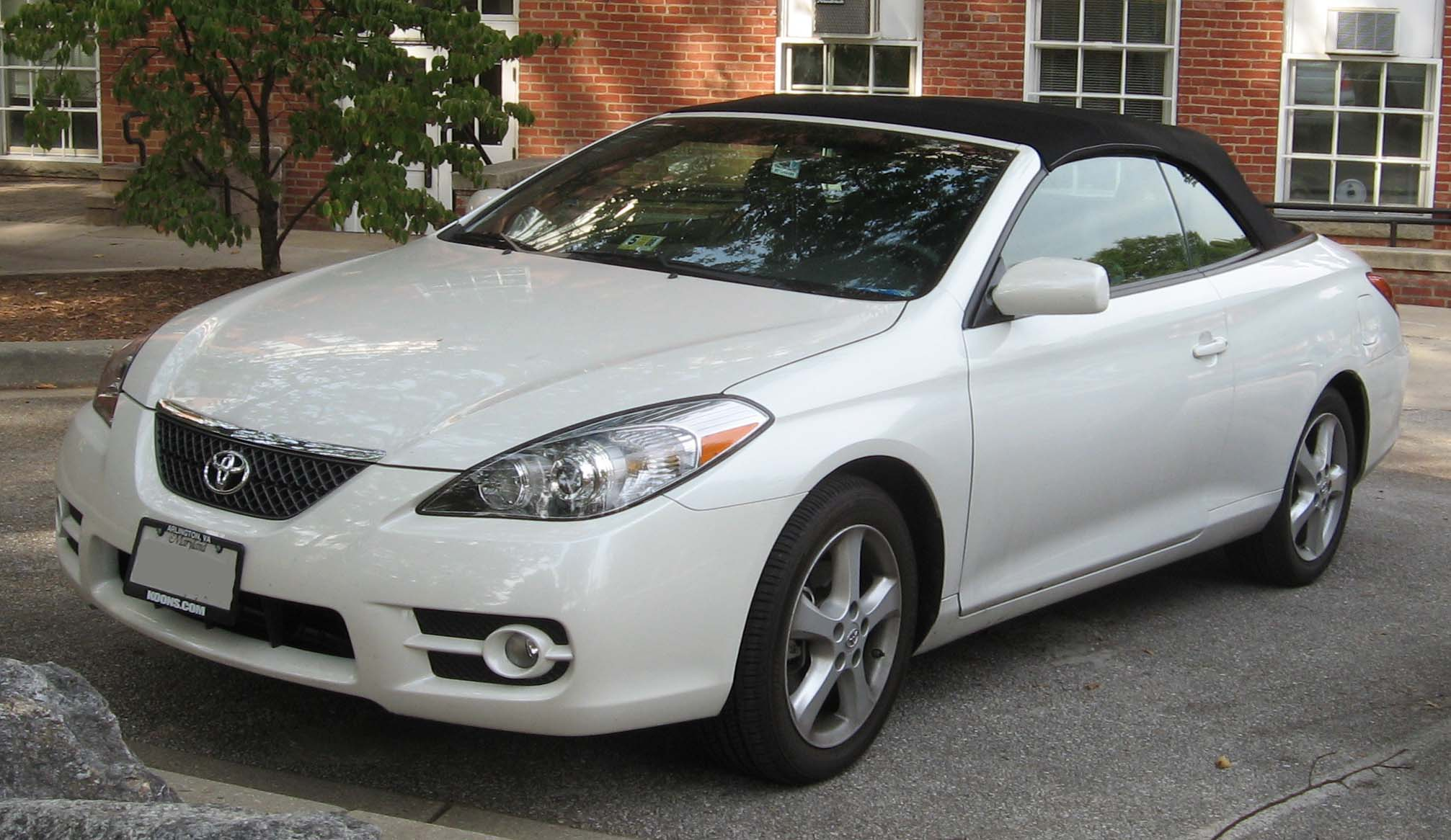
2007–2008 convertible - front

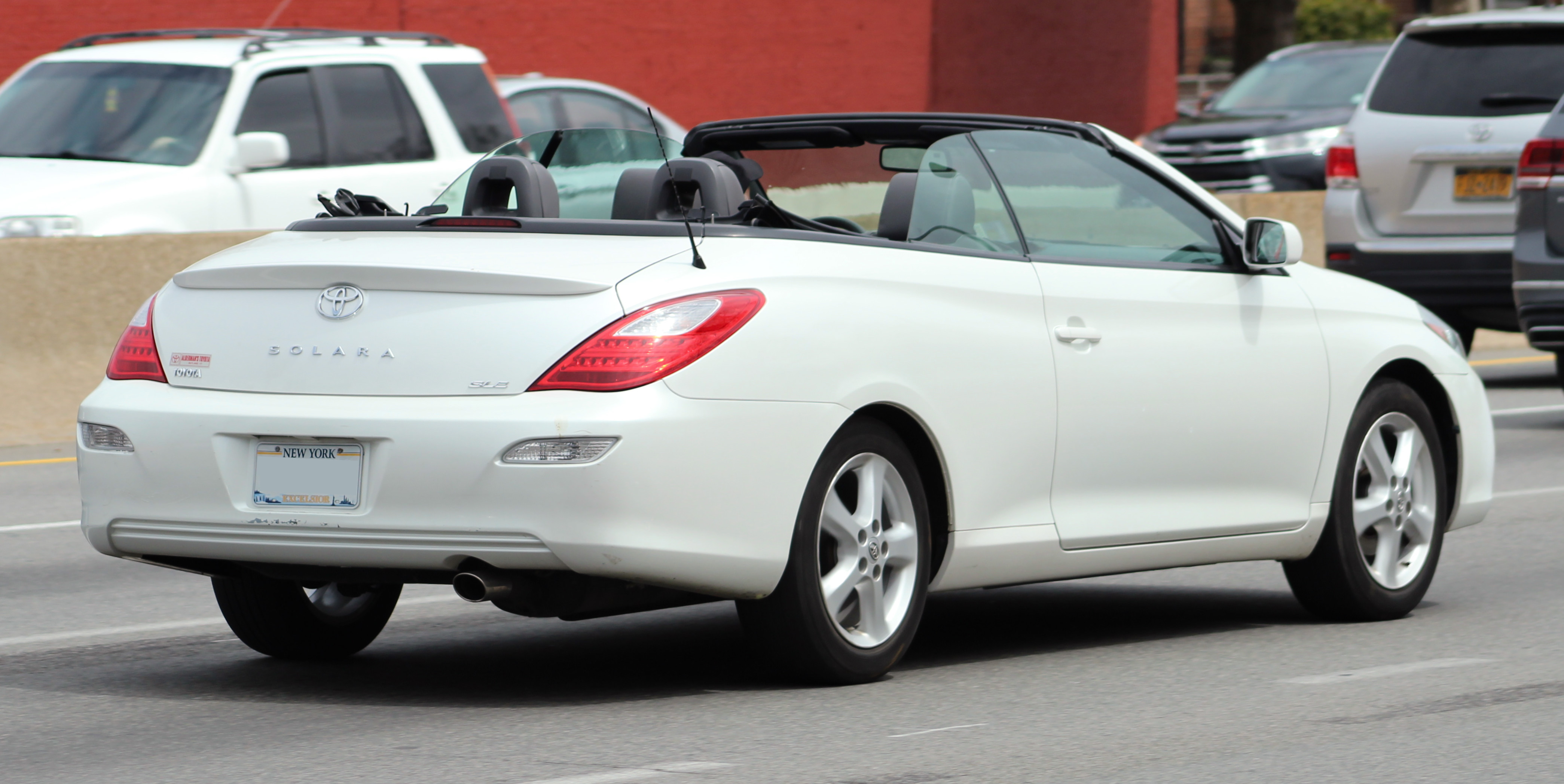
2007–2008 convertible - rear

== See also ==
- List of Toyota vehicles
