= List of Toyota transmissions =

Motor vehicle automatic and manual transmissions

Toyota is a Japanese car manufacturing company. It manufactures its own automobile transmissions and only purchases from suppliers in individual cases. They may be used in passenger cars and SUVs, or light commercial vehicles such as vans and light trucks. Aisin is a company of the Toyota Group. Therefore, the transmissions of both manufacturers are often based on identical gearset concepts.

Basically there are two types of motor vehicle transmissions:

- Manual – the driver has to perform each gear change using a manually operated clutch
- Automatic – once placed in drive (or any other 'automatic' selector position), it automatically selects the gear ratio dependent on engine speed and load. The HSD series of gearbox falls into this category.

Basically there are two types of gearbox installation:

- In the longitudinal direction, the gearbox is positioned parallel to the vehicle movement direction. Usually designed separately from the final drive (including the differential) unit, except for transaxle configuration, where the gearbox and final drive unit are combined in a single housing.
- In the transverse direction, the gearbox is positioned perpendicular to the vehicle movement direction. The gearbox and final drive unit is usually combined in a single housing due to the much more restricted space available.

Every type of transmission occurs in every type of installation.

== Manual ==
=== Transverse ===
==== C-series ====
The C-series is a manual transmission for transverse engine applications, front engine front wheel drive and mid-engine rear wheel drive applications, built by Aisin AI, as well in the Elise and Exige.

Models:

- C4x
- C14x
- C5x
- C15x
- C25x
- C55x
- C6x
- C16x

==== E-series ====
The E-series transmission for Front, All Wheel Drive, and Mid-Engine layout applications.

Models:

- E5x
- E15x
- E25x
- E35x
- EA6x
- EB6x
- EC6x
- EExx

=== Longitudinal ===
==== G-series ====
The G-series is a 4- and 5-speed manual transmission for Rear Wheel Drive and All Wheel Drive applications, built by Aisin AI and Toyota Autoparts Philippines. Related to Aidin AX5.

Models:

- G40 4-speed
- G52 5-speed
- G53 5-speed
- G54 5-speed
- G55 5-speed
- G57 5-speed 4WD
- G58 5-speed 4WD
- G59 5-speed 2WD

==== H-series ====
The H-series is a 4- and 5-speed manual transmission for Land Cruisers and Coaster from 1967 onward.

Models:

- H4x 4-speed
- H5x 5-speed
- H15xx 5-speed

==== J-series ====
The J-series is a 6-speed manual transmission for rear-wheel drive applications, built by Aisin Seiki (Type AZ6). This transmission was used in the Altezza AS200 and RS200. The same Aisin AZ6 transmission is also found in other models such as the Mazda MX-5 (Miata), Nissan Silvia, Mazda RX-8, Lexus IS and Toyota 86/Scion FR-S/Subaru BRZ.

Models:

- J160 6-speed

There was also a J30 3-speed manual transmission used in 1969-1975 Land Cruisers.

==== K-series ====
The K-series is a 4- and 5-speed manual transmission for small cars.

Models:

- K40 4-speed
- K50 5-speed

==== L-series ====
The L-series are 4- and 5-speed manual transmission for Rear Wheel Drive cars and trucks. Not to be confused with the L-series (HSD) hybrid transmissions.

Models:

- L40 4-speed
- L42 4-speed
- L43 4-speed
- L45 4-speed
- L48 4-speed
- L50 5-speed
- L52 5-speed

==== P-series ====
The P-series is a 5-speed manual transmission for Rear Wheel Drive cars with Porsche-type synchronizers. Not to be confused with the P-series (HSD) hybrid transmissions.

Models:

- P51

==== R-series ====
The R-series is a 5-speed manual transmission for RWD and 4WD vehicles built by Aisin AI, Toyota Autoparts Philippines and Toyota Kirloskar Auto Parts. Known internally to Aisin as the AR5.

Models:

- R150 2WD truck
- R150F 4WD truck
- R151F 4WD truck
- R154 RWD car
- R155 2WD truck
- R155F 4WD truck
- R156F 4WD truck

==== RA-series ====
The RA-series is a 6-speed manual transmission for longitudinally mounted engines in RWD and 4WD vehicles built by Aisin AI and known internally to Aisin as the AY6.

Models:

- RA60 2WD truck
- RA60F 4WD truck
- RA61F 4WD truck
- RA62 RWD car used in Lexus IS250 and Mark X
- RA63 RWD car used in Lexus IS220d

==== RC-series ====
The RC-series is a 6-speed manual transmission for longitudinally mounted engines in 4WD vehicles manufactured by Aisin. Known internally to Aisin as the AC6.

Models:

- RC60 2WD truck
- RC60F 4WD truck
- RC61 2WD truck
- RC61F 4WD truck
- RC62F 4WD truck

==== S-series ====
The S-series is a 5-speed manual transmission for front and mid-engine drive applications.

Models:

- S51
- S53
- S54

==== T-series ====
The T-series is a 4/5/6-speed manual transmission.

Models:

- T40 4-speed
- T50 5-speed
- TLxx 6-speed

==== W-series ====
The W-series is a 4- or 5-speed manual transmission built by Aisin AI. Related to the Aisin AX5.

Models:

- W40 4-speed
- W45 4-speed aluminum
- W50 5-speed steel
- W51 5-speed aluminum
- W52 5-speed steel
- W55 5-speed aluminum
- W56 5-speed truck
- W57 5-speed
- W58 5-speed
- W59 5-speed truck

==== V-series ====
The V-series is a 6-speed manual transmission built by Getrag.

Models:

- V160

== Automatic ==
=== Transverse ===
==== A-series ====
The A-series are 2- to 10-speed automatic transmissions for front wheel drive, all wheel drive, or rear wheel drive use built by Aisin-Warner.

Models:

- Axx RWD 2-, 3-, and 4-speed
- A1xx FWD 3- and 4-speed
- A2xx FWD 4-speed
- A3xx RWD/4WD truck
- A4xx RWD/4WD truck
- A5xx FWD
- A6xx RWD/4WD 5-speed
- A7xx RWD/AWD/4WD truck
- A8xx
- A9xx RWD
- AAxx RWD
- AB6xx RWD/4WD truck
- AC6xx RWD/4WD
- AE8xx RWD/4WD
- AJAxx RWD/4WD
- AL8xx RWD/4WD

==== U-series ====
The U-series is an automatic transmission for front wheel drive applications.

Models:

- U1xx
- U2xx
- U3xx
- U66x

==== CVT Gearbox ====
===== K-series =====
The K-series are CVT transmissions for front wheel drive.

Models:

- K110 FWD
- K111 FWD
- K112 FWD
- K210 FWD
- K310 FWD
- K311 FWD
- K410 FWD
- K41A FWD
- K41B FWD
- K411 FWD

==== Hybrid ====
===== P-series (HSD) =====
The P-series (HSD) are Hybrid Synergy Drive transmissions used in Toyota and Lexus hybrids for FWD-based platforms.

Models:

- P110 1st generation Prius (1998-2000)
- P111 1st generation Prius (2001-2003)
- P112 2nd generation Prius (2004-2009)
- P210 Estima Hybrid (2001-2005), Alphard Hybrid (2003-2008)
- P310 Highlander/Kluger Hybrid (2005-2007), Harrier Hybrid/Lexus RX 400h (2005-2009)
- P311 Estima (2006-2019), Alphard Hybrid (2009-2011), Camry Hybrid (2007-2011), Lexus HS 250h (2010-2012) - with motorized oil pump & additional cooling
- P312 Nissan Altima Hybrid - based on P311
- P313 Highlander/Kluger Hybrid (2008-2013), Harrier Hybrid/Lexus RX450h (2010-2015) - based on P310.
- P314 Alphard Hybrid (2012-2015), Camry Hybrid (2012-2017), RAV4 Hybrid (2015-2018), Lexus NX 300h (2015-2021) - based on P311
- P410 3rd generation Prius (2010-2015), Prius α/Prius v (2012-2017), Auris (2013-2018) and Lexus CT 200H (2011-2017)
- P510 Yaris Hybrid (2012-2019), Aqua/Prius c (2012-2019), Corolla Hybrid (2014-2018) - based on P110.
- P610 4th generation Prius (2016-2022), C-HR 1.8L (2018-2022), Corolla Hybrid 1.8L (2019-2022), Corolla Cross (2021-) - first with motor and generator in parallel instead of in series.
- P710 Camry Hybrid (2018-), Crown Hybrid 2.5L (2019-2022), RAV4 Hybrid (2019-), Avalon Hybrid (2019-), Harrier/Venza Hybrid (2021-2024), Lexus ES 300h (2019-)
- P711 C-HR 2.0L (2018-2022), Corolla Hybrid 2.0L (2019-2022), Lexus UX 250h (2019-)
- P810 Highlander Hybrid (2020-), Sienna Hybrid (2021-) RAV4 Prime (2021-) Lexus NX 350h/450h+ (2022-), RX 350h/450h+ (2023-), LM 350h (2023-)
- P910 Yaris Hybrid/Mazda2 (2020-), Yaris Cross (2021-), Aqua (2021-)
- PA10 5th generation Prius 1.8L (2023-), Corolla Hybrid 1.8L (2023-), C-HR 1.8L (2023-)
- PB10 5th generation Prius 2.0L (2023-), Innova Zenix Hybrid (2022–), Corolla Hybrid 2.0L (2023-), C-HR 2.0L (2023-)
- PB12 5th generation Prius PHEV (2023-), C-HR PHEV (2024-)
- PC60 Crown Hybrid Max (2023-), Grand Highlander Hybrid Max (2024-), Lexus LM 500h (2023-), RX 500h (2023-), TX 500h (2024-) - first with single motor and clutch

=== Longitudinal ===
==== L-series (HSD) ====
The L-series (HSD) are Hybrid Synergy Drive transmissions used in Toyota and Lexus hybrids for Rear Wheel Drive, All Wheel Drive, and Four Wheel Drive based platforms.

Models:

- L110 Lexus GS450h (2007-2020), Crown Hybrid (2008-2012) - combines HSD with a 2-speed Ravigneaux gearset
- L110F Lexus LS600h (2008–2017), Century (2018-) - same as L110 but AWD variant and more electric HP (220 hp MG2)
- L210 Crown Hybrid 2.5L (2013-2018), Lexus IS300h (2014-), GS300h (2014-2020) and RC300h (2015-)
- L210F Lexus IS300h AWD (2016-) - same as L210 but AWD variant
- L310 Crown Hybrid 3.5L (2018-2022), Lexus LC500h (2018-), LS500h (2018-) - combines HSD with a 4-speed planetary gearset. Has pre-programmed 10-Speed shifts.
- L310F Lexus LS500h AWD (2018-) - same as L310 but AWD variant
- L4xxx RWD/4WD
- L4A0E/F Sequoia (2023-), Tundra iForce Max (2022-) - combines HSD with a 10-speed automatic transmission
- L580F Land Cruiser (2024-), Tacoma iForce Max (2024-), Lexus GX 550h (2024-) - combines HSD with an 8-speed automatic transmission

==== TX-series ====
The TX-Series is an automatic transmission for boxer engine rear wheel drive applications.

Models:

- TXxx RWD

== See also ==
- Toyota A transmission
- Toyota U transmission
- List of Aisin transmissions
- List of Toyota engines
