= Toyota L-series (HSD) transmission =

Hybrid gearbox

Toyota Motor Corporation's L-series of Hybrid Synergy Drive (HSD) transmissions (not to be confused the 4 and 5 speed manual L-series Toyota transmissions) are hybrid gearboxes containing 2 electric motors, one for driving the wheels and one for controlling the ratio between the engine and the electric drive motor, as well as an optional 2 or 4 speed planetary transmission attached to the end of the HSD device OR a conventional automatic transmission that uses an electric drive motor instead of a torque converter for additional vehicle propulsion.

== Toyota L110 / L110f ==
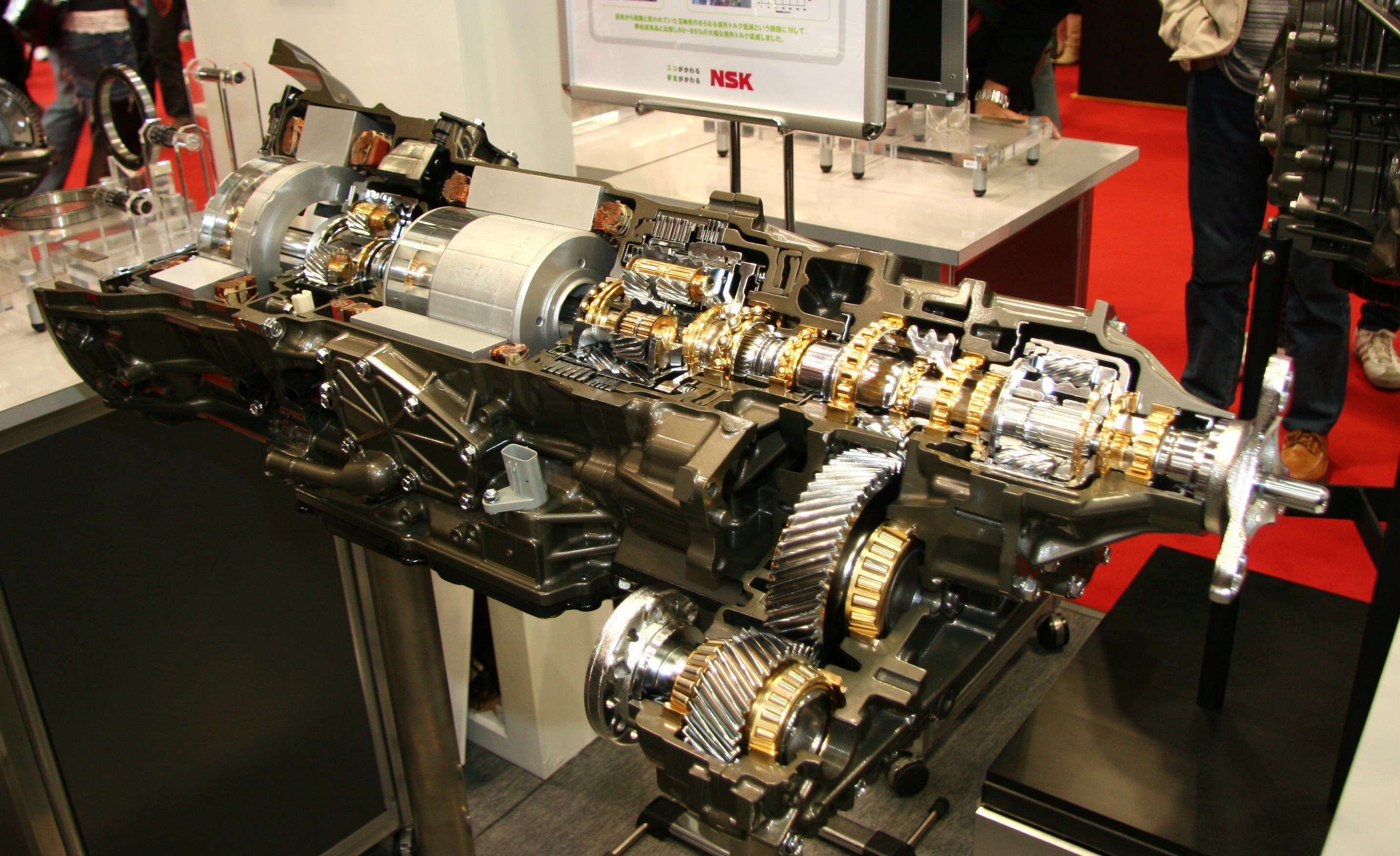
L110f for Lexus LS600h

The L110 transmission is used in the Lexus GS450h 2006-2020 and the AWD L110f variant is used in the 2007-2016 LS600h / LS600hl.

There are two motors contained inside the L110 transmission's HSD: MG2 which is connected to the output of the and MG1 which is connected between MG2 and the internal combustion engine. MG1 varies the connection between the engine and the wheels. Both MG1 and MG2 are 3 phase motors powered by an inverter connected to an Ni-MH battery back. The L110f housing includes an LF1A TORSEN LSD transfer. For more information please see: Hybrid vehicle drivetrain.

The L110/f contains a 2 speed Ravigneaux gear set for reducing the final ratio from the HSD to the wheels, the vehicle uses the first gear to get moving under purely electric power from MG2, before moving into second gear. If the ICE is on, then the transmission will switch to gear 2, therefore first gear is only used to get the car moving under electric power.

The L110 transmission utilises both a mechanical, engine driven oil pump and an electric oil pump for use when the ICE is off. The L110 utilises a "sequential shiftmatic system" simulating 8 different fixed gear ratios selectable by the driver.

== Toyota L210 ==
The L210 transmission is used in the Lexus RC300h, GS300h and IS300h. It features an EV only mode where the car can run purely from electric power, similar to the L110f. The L210 has a maximum power output of 105 kW (143 PS; 141 hp) with a peak torque of 300 N⋅m (220 lbf⋅ft).

The L210 optionally came with a 6-step sequential gear change function selectable by paddles on the steering wheel.

The IS300h pairs the L210 with a 650 Volt, 192 cell NiMH battery pack.

== Toyota L310 / L310f ==
The L310 transmission is used in the LC500h and LS500h and Crown Hybrid paired with the 8GR-FXS engine. The L310f AWD variant is used in the AWD LS500h. The L310/f is paired with Li-ion batteries in the LC/LS.

It combines a hybrid power split device with a 4-speed planetary gearset and comes with 10 pre-programmed shifts to simulate a tiptronic transmission.

Simulated Ratios:

- First Gear: 4.701:1
- Second Gear: 3.5:1
- Third Gear: 2.801:1
- Fourth Gear: 2.241:1
- Fifth Gear: 1.793:1
- Sixth Gear: 1.436:1
- Seventh Gear: 1.197:1
- Eight Gear: 0.998:1
- Ninth Gear: 0.767:1
- Tenth Gear: 0.58:1

Which are derived from the following physical ratios in the 4 speed transmission:

- First Gear: 3.538:1
- Second Gear: 1.888:1
- Third Gear: 1.000:1
- Fourth Gear: 0.650:1

== L4xxx ==
FR/4WD Transmission

=== L4A0E ===
10-speed automatic Transmission

Applications (calendar years):

- 2021-present Toyota Tundra 3.4LTT Hybrid RWD

Gear ratios:

1	2	3	4	5	6	7	8	9	10	R
4.923:1	3.257:1	2.349:1	1.944:1	1.532:1	1.193:1	1.000:1	0.810:1	0.661:1	0.613:1	4.307:1

=== L4A0F ===
10-speed automatic Transmission

Applications (calendar years):

- 2021-present Toyota Tundra 3.4LTT Hybrid 4WD

Gear ratios:

1	2	3	4	5	6	7	8	9	10	R
4.923:1	3.257:1	2.349:1	1.944:1	1.532:1	1.193:1	1.000:1	0.810:1	0.661:1	0.613:1	4.307:1
