= Toyota R transmission =

Family of 5-speed RWD/4WD transmissions

Toyota Motor Corporation's R family is a family of 5-speed RWD/4WD transmissions built by Aisin. They share many characteristics (such as bell housing-to-body bolt patterns) with the Aisin AR transmission (rebadged MA-5 by GM, AX-15 by Jeep, and AR5 by Isuzu).

== R150 ==
A 2WD transmission found in Toyota Tacoma/Hilux 1996+ and Toyota Prado. It came with two input shaft lengths pre-1996 and post-1996 (20mm longer).

In Australia the 160mm input shaft R150 came in 2TR-FE, 3RZ, and 5VZ 2WD Hilux. The longer 190mm input shaft version only came in V6 2WD Hilux.

Ratios:

- First Gear: 3.830:1
- Second Gear: 2.062:1
- Third Gear: 1.436:1
- Fourth Gear: 1.00:1
- Fifth Gear: 0.838:1
- Reverse Gear 4.22:1

== R150F ==
A 4WD manual transmission found in many Toyota trucks, including Land Cruiser II, Land Cruiser Prado, Toyota 4Runner, and Hilux Surf (1989-1995) 2L-T series and 1KZ series Turbo Diesel, V6 3VZE and 5VZ-FE (also Japan, UK and Europe 1KZ/TE 4Runner 89–95).

T100:
1995-1998 5VZ-FE 4WD 5MT Transfer case - VF1A

Tacoma/Hilux:
1988–1995.5 3VZ-E 4WD 1995.5-2004 5VZ-FE 4WD N160/N170/N190

4Runner/Hilux Surf:
1988–1995.5 3VZ-E 4WD 1995.5-2000 5VZ-FE 4WD N180

Ratios:

- First Gear: 3.830:1
- Second Gear: 2.062:1
- Third Gear: 1.436:1
- Fourth Gear: 1.00:1
- Fifth Gear: 0.838:1
- Reverse Gear 4.220:1

== R151F ==
A 4WD transmission used in a wide range of Toyota 4x4s.

Land Cruiser:
1986-1990 2LTE J70-J73
1991-1994 1PZ PZJ70
1990-2002 1HZ J70-J79
1998-2002 1HZ J100/J105

Hilux/Pickup/Tacoma:
1986/1987 22-RTE N90-N120
1997-2005 1KZTE N140-N170
2006-2015 1KD-FTV N15-N26

4Runner/Surf/Prado:
1990-1993 2LTE N130 4runner/Surf
1994-1995 1KZTE N130 4runner/Surf
1996-2002 1KZTE N180 Surf/J90 Prado
2002-2005 1KZTE N210 Surf/J120 Prado
2006-2009 1KDFTV N210 Surf/J120 Prado
2009-2015 1KDFTV J150 Prado

Ratios:

- First Gear: 4.315:1
- Second Gear: 2.330:1
- Third Gear: 1.436:1
- Fourth Gear: 1.00:1
- Fifth Gear: 0.838:1
- Reverse Gear 4.220:1

== R154 (1987-2004) ==
A 5-speed transmission found in the MKIII Supra Turbo, Toyota Crown, Toyota Chaser Tourer V, Toyota Mark II Tourer V, Toyota Cresta Tourer V, and Toyota Soarer (turbo).

There are four different shifter housing styles (with two non-interchangeable six-bolt base patterns: early vs late):

- Sealed shifter (early 6-bolt pattern), found on the MkIII Supra Turbo R154.
- Tripod linkage style (early 6-bolt pattern), found on Jzx90 Tourer-V & will fit JZZ30 soarer platforms.
- Tripod linkage style (late model 6-bolt pattern), found on the JZX100 and JZZ30 soarer.
- JZX110 sealed style shifter (late model 6-bolt pattern), found on JZX110. This shifter position is slightly closer to the front of the car than tripod by 15mm.
- R150 sealed shifter direct mount (late model 6-bolt pattern), found on 2WD Hilux (fits only late model 6-bolt pattern).

Note: The US only received the R154 in the 1987-1992 Toyota Supra MA70 (7M-GTE) and is a sealed shifter style; all other examples were designated for other markets.

Ratios:

- First Gear: 3.251:1
- Second Gear: 1.955:1
- Third Gear: 1.310:1
- Fourth Gear: 1.00:1
- Fifth Gear: 0.753:1
- Reverse Gear: 3.180:1

== R155 ==
A 2WD transmission found in the 2005-2015 Toyota Tacoma.

- First Gear: 3.95:1
- Second Gear: 2.06:1
- Third Gear: 1.44:1
- Fourth Gear: 1.00:1
- Fifth Gear: 0.81:1
- Reverse Gear: 4.22:1

== R155F ==
A 4WD transmission found in the 2005-2015 Toyota Tacoma.

- First Gear: 3.95:1
- Second Gear: 2.06:1
- Third Gear: 1.44:1
- Fourth Gear: 1.00:1
- Fifth Gear: 0.81:1
- Reverse Gear: 4.22:1

== R156 ==
A RWD transmission. A variant exists for the Chilean market named "R156, CHILE SPEC (EURO 5 REGULATION)," found in the 2012-2015 (commercial years) Toyota Hilux with 2KDFTV engine.

- First Gear: 4.31:1
- Second Gear: 2.33:1
- Third Gear: 1.44:1
- Fourth Gear: 1.00:1
- Fifth Gear: 0.79:1
- Reverse Gear: 4.22:1

== R156F ==
An upgraded version of the R155F 4WD transmission with triple-cone synchronizer added to first gear, found in the 2016-2017 Toyota Tacoma.

- First Gear: 4.31:1
- Second Gear: 2.33:1
- Third Gear: 1.44:1
- Fourth Gear: 1.00:1
- Fifth Gear: 0.79:1
- Reverse Gear: 4.22:1

== R350 ==
A 2WD transmission found in the 100 Series Turbo Diesel Toyota HiAce Super Custom. It has side mounted shifting levers for connection to linkages or cables.

== R351 ==
A 2WD transmission found in the 200 Series Toyota HiAce, petrol (TRH2XX) and diesel (KDH2XX). This variant has a triple cone synchromesh on first and second gears. It has side mounted shifting levers for connection to linkages or cables.

- First Gear: 4.313:1
- Second Gear: 2.330:1
- Third Gear: 1.436:1
- Fourth Gear: 1.000:1
- Fifth Gear: 0.838:1
- Reverse Gear: 4.220:1

== R452 ==
A 2WD 5-speed transmission found in most light duty Toyota Dyna trucks, with a drum brake on the rear and steel housings. These transmissions can be used to give a significantly lower first, and a slightly higher overdrive (5th: 0.695:1) when fitted to an R151 4WD gearbox.

- First Gear: 5.147:1
- Second Gear: 2.74:1
- Third Gear: 1.93:1
- Fourth Gear: 1.00:1
- Fifth Gear: 0.695:1
- Reverse Gear: 5.04:1

== See also ==
- List of Toyota transmissions
