= Toyota RC transmission =

Family of 6-speed RWD/4WD transmissions

Toyota Motor Corporation's RC family is a family of 6-speed RWD/4WD transmissions manufactured by Aisin. The RC transmission uses an output reduction method to achieve a compact construction. A double overdrive (5th and 6th gears) is used. A multi-cone synchromesh mechanism is used for 1st, 2nd, and 3rd gears to improve shift feel. Similar in some aspects to the older RA transmission, the RC features a separate clutch housing and uses a steel release bearing sleeve to improve serviceability and service life. This transmission is known internally to Aisin as the AC6.

== RC60 ==
A 2WD transmission.

Ratios:

- First Gear: 4.784:1
- Second Gear: 2.423:1
- Third Gear: 1.443:1
- Fourth Gear: 1.00:1
- Fifth Gear: 0.777:1
- Sixth Gear: 0.643:1
- Reverse: 4.066:1

Applications (calendar years):

- 2015– Toyota Hilux (2.4L 2WD diesel models, GUN122/135)
- 2015– Toyota Fortuner (2.4L 2WD diesel models, GUN165)

== RC60J ==
A 2WD remote cable-shift type transmission.

Ratios:

- First Gear: 4.784:1
- Second Gear: 2.423:1
- Third Gear: 1.443:1
- Fourth Gear: 1.00:1
- Fifth Gear: 0.777:1
- Sixth Gear: 0.643:1
- Reverse: 4.066:1

Applications (calendar years):

- 2019– Toyota HiAce (1GDFTV 2.8L diesel, GDH300/301/320/321/322/328; and 7GR 3.5L gas models, GRH300/301/320/321/322)

== RC60F ==
A 4WD transmission.

Ratios:

- First Gear: 4.784:1
- Second Gear: 2.423:1
- Third Gear: 1.443:1
- Fourth Gear: 1.00:1
- Fifth Gear: 0.777:1
- Sixth Gear: 0.643:1
- Reverse: 4.066:1

Applications (calendar years):

- 2015– Toyota Hilux (2.4L 4WD diesel models, GUN125).
- 2015– Toyota Fortuner (2.4L 2WD diesel models, GUN165)
- 2024– Toyota Tacoma (2.4L 4WD gasoline ONLY)

== RC61 ==
A 2WD transmission.

Ratios:

- First Gear: 4.784:1
- Second Gear: 2.423:1
- Third Gear: 1.443:1
- Fourth Gear: 1.00:1
- Fifth Gear: 0.826:1
- Sixth Gear: 0.643:1
- Reverse: 4.066:1

Applications (calendar years):

- 2015– Toyota Hilux (2.5L, KUN135; 2.8L, GUN136; and 3.0L, KUN136, 2WD diesel models)
- 2015– Toyota Fortuner (2.8L 2WD diesel models, GUN165)

== RC61F ==
A 4WD transmission.

Ratios:

- First Gear: 4.784:1
- Second Gear: 2.423:1
- Third Gear: 1.443:1
- Fourth Gear: 1.00:1
- Fifth Gear: 0.826:1
- Sixth Gear: 0.643:1
- Reverse: 4.066:1

Applications (calendar years):

- 2015– Toyota Hilux (2.5L, KUN125; 2.8L, GUN126; and 3.0L, KUN126, 4WD diesel models)
- 2015– Toyota Fortuner (2.8L, GUN156; and 3.0L, KUN156, 4WD diesel models)

== RC62F ==
A 4WD transmission.

Ratios:

- First Gear: 3.982:1
- Second Gear: 2.017:1
- Third Gear: 1.321:1
- Fourth Gear: 1.00:1
- Fifth Gear: 0.848:1
- Sixth Gear: 0.713:1
- Reverse: 3.385:1

Applications (calendar years):

- 2016–2023 Toyota Tacoma (3.5L 4WD V6 models, GRN305)
