= Toyota S transmission =

Transmission systems in Toyota S cars

Toyota Motor Corporation's S family is a family of cable operated manual transmissions built for small to mid sized front wheel drive vehicles, but also used in mid-engine applications. The S family has received various upgrades and enhancements over its design life.

== S5x (5 Series Family) ==
=== S50 ===
A 5-Speed Manual Transmission.

Ratios:

- First Gear: 3.538:1
- Second Gear: 2.041:1
- Third Gear: 1.322:1
- Fourth Gear: 0.945:1
- Fifth Gear: 0.731:1
- Reverse Gear: 3.153:1
- Final Drive: 3.736:1

Applications:

- Toyota Corolla - diesel engine
- Toyota Carina - diesel engine
- Toyota Camry - diesel engine

=== S51 ===
A 5-Speed Manual Transmission.

Ratios:

- First Gear: 3.538:1
- Second Gear: 1.960:1
- Third Gear: 1.250:1
- Fourth Gear: 0.945:1
- Fifth Gear: 0.731:1
- Reverse Gear: 3.153:1
- Final Drive: 3.944:1

Applications:

- Toyota Camry (XV10) 4 cyl
- Toyota Camry (XV20) 4 cyl
- Toyota Solara
- Toyota Carina CT211 Diesel

=== S52 ===
A 5-Speed Manual Transmission.

Ratios:

- First Gear: 3.285:1
- Second Gear: 2.041:1
- Third Gear: 1.322:1
- Fourth Gear: 0.945:1
- Fifth Gear: 0.731:1
- Reverse Gear: 3.153:1
- Final Drive: 3.944:1

Applications:

- Toyota Corolla
- Toyota Carina - gasoline engine.

=== S53 ===
A 5-Speed Manual Transmission. 1993 Received updated synchros

Ratios:

- First Gear: 3.285
- Second Gear: 2.041
- Third Gear: 1.322
- Fourth Gear: 1.028
- Fifth Gear: 0.820
- Reverse Gear: 3.153
- Final Drive: 3.944:1
- Final Drive: 3.736:1 (1990 GT Narrow body Celica only)

Applications:

- 1986 Toyota Celica ST162 (Australia) (3S-GE Engine, starter under manifold)
- 1990 Toyota Camry SV21 (Australia) (3S-FE Engine, starter over gearbox)
- 1990–1993 Toyota Celica
- 1998 Toyota Camry SXV20L (Europe) (5S-FE Engine, starter over gearbox)

=== S54 ===
A 5-Speed Manual Transmission.

Ratios

- First Gear: 3.285
- Second Gear: 1.960
- Third Gear: 1.322
- Fourth Gear: 1.028
- Fifth Gear: 0.820
- Reverse Gear: 3.153
- Final Drive: 4.176

S54-06A = Open Differential S54-06D = Helical Differential on 96-99 SS-III spec only

Weight (fully oiled) = 88 lbs

Applications:

- 1993–1999 Toyota Celica ST202, (Starter over gearbox)
- 1994–1999 Toyota Curren ST206 (3S-GE)
- Toyota MR2 SW20 (3S-GE, 3S-FE and 5S-FE non-turbo engines)

=== S55 ===
A 5-Speed Manual Transmission.

Ratios:

- First Gear: 3.538:1
- Second Gear: 1.960:1
- Third Gear: 1.250:1
- Fourth Gear: 0.945:1
- Fifth Gear: 0.731:1
- Reverse Gear: 3.153:1
- Final Drive: 3.944:1

Applications:

- Toyota Corolla
- Toyota Carina
- Toyota Camry (3S-FE)
