= Niki (given name) =

Niki is a first given unisex name. Niki has a Persian origin and it is a female name, meaning kindness, Being good, good, benevolent, good turn, goodness, nobility, right; 2- (in ancient times) comfort, prosperity, afterlife reward. In Greek it is a variant of the male Nikias (Ancient Greek) and female Nicole, a female form of Nicholas (French).

A list of notable people with the name Niki is provided below.

== Music ==
- Niki Barr, American musician
- Niki Chow (born 1979), Hong Kong actress and Cantopop singer
- Niki DeMartino (born 1995), American singer and internet personality, one half of the duo Niki and Gabi
- Niki Haris (born 1967), singer, dancer, and backing vocalist
- Niki Shiina, fictional singer from the franchise Ensemble Stars!
- Niki Sullivan (1937–2004), American rock and roll guitar player
- Niki Zefanya (born 1999), Indonesian R&B singer and songwriter

== Film and television ==
- Niki Caro (born 1966), New Zealand film director and screenwriter
- Niki Chow (born 1979), Hong Kong actress and singer
- Niki de Saint Phalle (1930–2002), French sculptor, painter, and filmmaker
- Niki Karimi (born 1971), multi-award-winning Iranian actress and movie director
- Niki Linardou (1939–2012), Greek film and stage actress
- Niki Marvin, film producer active since the 1980s
- Niki Sanders, a fictional character on the television show Heroes
- Niki Stevens, a fictional character on the television show The L Word
- Niki Middleton (born 1975), Canadian Indigenous Metis actress and model

== Sports ==
- Niki Bakoyianni (born 1968), Greek high jumper
- Niki Garagouni (born 1977), Greek volleyball player
- Niki Jedlicka (born 1987), Austrian poker player
- Niki Jenkins (born 1973), Canadian judoka
- Niki Lauda (1949–2019), Austrian aviation entrepreneur, former Formula One racing driver and three-time Formula One World Champion
- Niki Leferink (born 1976), Dutch football (soccer) player
- Niki Panetta (born 1986), Greek triple jumper
- Niki-Katerina Sidiropoulou (born 1974), Greek fencer
- Niki Xanthou (born 1973), Greek long jumper
- Niki Zimling (born 1985), Danish football (soccer) player

== Others ==
- Niki Albon (born 1992), British YouTuber and radio personality
- Niki Ashton (born 1982), Canadian politician
- Niki Davis, New Zealand computer scientist
- Niki Goulandris (1925–2019), Greek conservationist, artist, and philanthropist
- Niki Kelsey, American politician
- Niki Marangou (1948–2013), Cypriot writer and artist
- Niki Sharma (born 1979/1980), Canadian politician
- Niki Taylor (born 1975), American model
- Niki Tzavela (born 1947), Greek politician

== See also ==
- Nicki
- Nikii Daas
- Nikki (given name)
