= Nikii Daas =

Indian model, actress and beauty queen

- Born: Nikii Daas; 7 August 1988 (age 37); Mumbai, Maharashtra, India
- Occupations: Film actor Model

Nikii Daas (born 7 August 1988) is an Indian model, actress and beauty queen. She won the Gladrags beauty pageant and later received the title of "Miss Charming" while representing India at the international pageant Best Model of the World in Turkey. Daas started modelling professionally soon after that. Daas has appeared in campaigns for brands such as Spykar Jeans, Dolce & Gabbana, Globus, Donear suitings, Bombay Dyeing, Mag Wheels, Toyota Innova Car with Aamir Khan, Gold Souk (Dubai) – Mikura Pearls, and Paaneri Sarees. She has walked the ramp for designers such as Satya Paul, Raymonds, Shakir Shaikh, Marc Robinson, Prasad Bidapa, Elric D'souza, Lubna Adams, and Viveka Babajee. In 2007, she was featured in the Kingfisher Calendar. She made her acting debut in the 2013 Kannada film Mandahasa. Daas owns the India Legends cricket team, which play in the Road Safety World Series, a T20 cricket league which was created to spread awareness of road safety internationally.
