= Toyota Innova =

MPV produced by Toyota

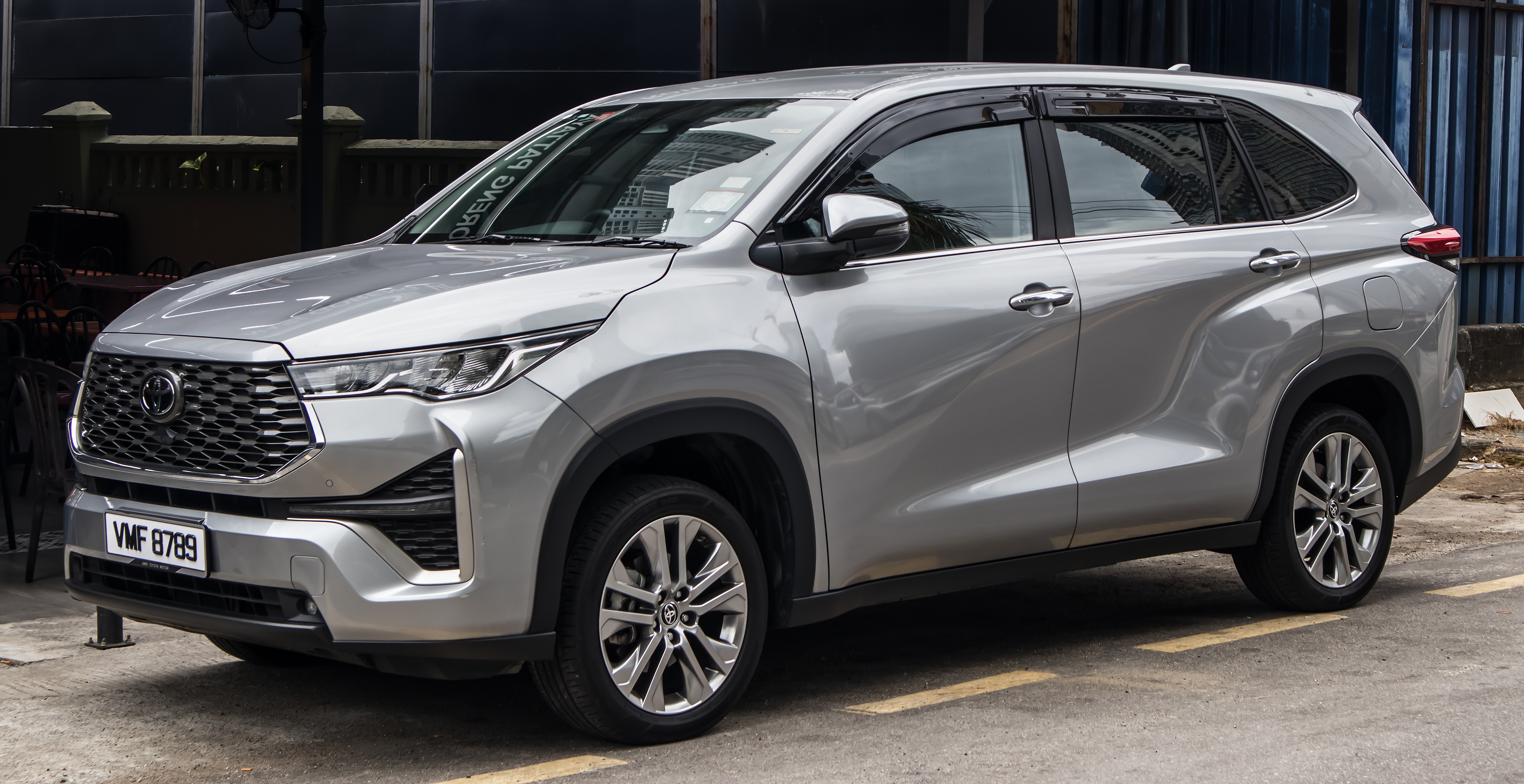
- Toyota Innova Zenix 2.0 V (Malaysia)

Overview
- Manufacturer: Toyota
- Also called: Toyota Kijang Innova (Indonesia); Suzuki Invicto (India, 2023–present)
- Production: September 2004 – present

Body and chassis
- Class: Compact MPV (2004–2015); Mid-size MPV (2015–present)
- Body style: 5-door wagon
- Layout: Front-engine, rear-wheel-drive (2004–present); Front-engine, front-wheel-drive (2022–present)
- Chassis: Body-on-frame (2004–present); Unibody (2022–present)

Chronology
- Predecessor: Toyota Kijang (F80); Toyota Qualis (India)

The Toyota Innova is a series of multi-purpose vehicles (MPV) manufactured by the Japanese carmaker Toyota since 2004, mainly sold with three-row seating.

The Innova is the replacement for the station wagon versions of the Toyota Kijang (internally known as the Toyota Utility Vehicle), which was also marketed under different names such as Tamaraw FX/Revo, Unser, Zace and Condor. Like the outgoing Kijang, the first two generations (2004–2022) of the Innova are rear-wheel-drive vehicles built on the body-on-frame chassis shared with the Hilux pickup truck and the Fortuner SUV under the IMV project, instead of the unibody construction commonly used by MPVs of its era. The chassis was adopted for its perceived strength and durability, attributes particularly valued by customers in Indonesia. The third-generation model introduced in 2022 switched to front-wheel-drive layout, using the GA-C platform with a unibody chassis. The change was made to make use of the hybrid powertrain (which the IMV platform cannot utilise), and to provide the comfort and efficiency benefits of the front-wheel-drive layout.

The Innova first entered production in Indonesia in September 2004 and has been manufactured in other emerging countries such as India, Malaysia, the Philippines, Taiwan and Vietnam. The Innova has also been marketed in Brunei, Cambodia, Myanmar, Thailand, GCC countries, Ecuador, Egypt, Jamaica and Argentina.

The name Innova comes from the English word "innovate". Its official name in Indonesia is Toyota Kijang Innova, while for other countries it is simply called "Innova". For the second generation, it is known as Toyota Innova Crysta in India and Thailand. For the third generation, it received another moniker in Indonesia as the Toyota Kijang Innova Zenix (Toyota Innova Zenix in overseas markets or simply Toyota Zenix in the Philippines) and in India as the Toyota Innova HyCross along with its rebadged version Maruti Suzuki Invicto.

== First generation (AN40; 2004) ==
First generation
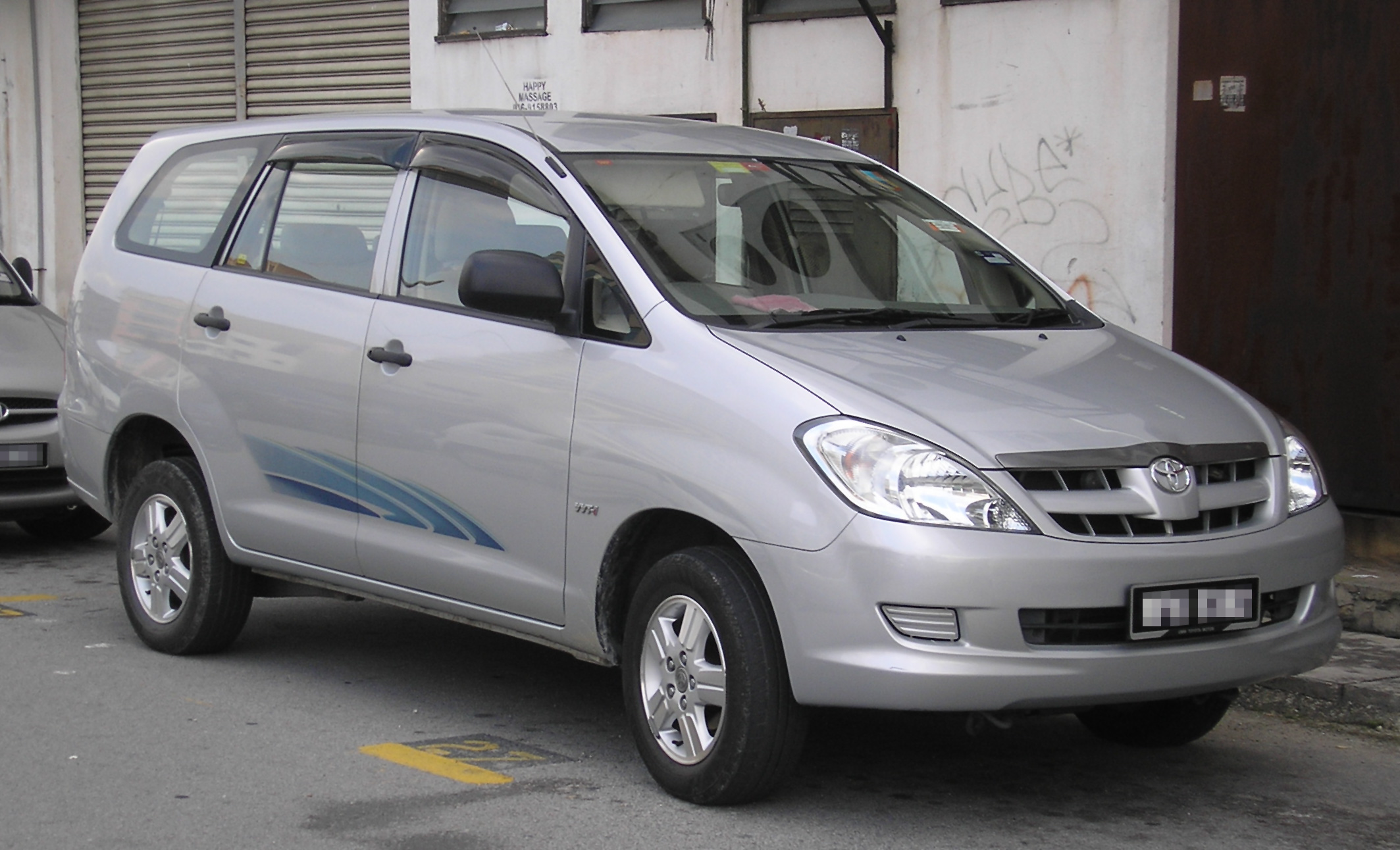
- Innova 2.0 E (TGN40; pre-facelift, Malaysia)

Overview
- Model code: AN40
- Also called: Toyota Kijang Innova (Indonesia)
- Production: September 2004 – October 2015 (Indonesia); February 2005 – March 2016 (India); March 2005 – April 2016 (Philippines); May 2005 – October 2016 (Malaysia); January 2006 – 2016 (Vietnam); July 2007 – 2016 (Taiwan)
- Assembly: Indonesia: Karawang (TMMIN); India: Bidadi (TKM); Philippines: Santa Rosa (TMP); Malaysia: Shah Alam (UMW); Vietnam: Vĩnh Phúc (TMV); Taiwan: Zhongli (Kuozui Motors)
- Designer: List: Kenichi Inukai, Shoichi Fujiyoshi, Yutaka Kubota and Yahiko Kumai (pre-facelift and 2008 facelift); Kentaro Asakura, Nobuya Tanai, Tetsu Endoh and Rudi Budiman (2008 facelift); Hirofumi Hokao, Shigetoshi Kouzai, Takafumi Ito, Tetsu Endoh and Yoshiyasu Neuchi (2011 facelift); Rudi Budiman (2013 facelift)

Body and chassis
- Class: Compact MPV
- Layout: Front-engine, rear-wheel-drive
- Platform: Toyota IMV platform
- Chassis: Body-on-frame
- Related: Toyota Fortuner/SW4 (AN50/60); Toyota Hilux (AN10/20/30)

Powertrain
- Engine: Petrol: 2.0 L 1TR-FE I4; 2.7 L 2TR-FE I4; Diesel: 2.5 L 2KD-FTV turbo I4
- Transmission: 5-speed manual; 4-speed automatic

Dimensions
- Wheelbase: 2,750 mm (108.3 in)
- Length: 4,555–4,585 mm (179.3–180.5 in)
- Width: 1,760–1,775 mm (69.3–69.9 in)
- Height: 1,745–1,760 mm (68.7–69.3 in)
- Kerb weight: 1,480–1,640 kg (3,263–3,616 lb)

In September 2004, Toyota debuted the first-generation Innova (designated AN40 series) in Indonesia. It followed the 2003 introduction of the Avanza, the replacement for low-spec versions of the Kijang. Badged as the Kijang Innova, the first-generation Innova in Indonesia was marketed as the fifth-generation Kijang to maintain the lineage with the fourth-generation model. It also had a more upmarket positioning than the latter.

Development started in 1999 and was led by Kaoru Hosokawa, the chief engineer and product planning leader of Toyota Commercial Vehicle Development Centre. Targeted annual production in Indonesia was 80,000 units, including 10,000 units for export.

Compared to the long-wheelbase fourth-generation Kijang wagon, the Innova was made 30 mm (1.2 in) longer and 100 mm (3.9 in) wider, while gaining more rounded MPV proportions. Its wheelbase also grew by 100 mm (3.9 in). Unlike its predecessor, the Innova could be equipped with modern safety features such as ABS and airbags, as it was designed as a more globally oriented model. Other new technologies incorporated into the Innova include throttle-by-wire and variable valve timing. It adopted an independent double wishbone front suspension with coil springs and a stabiliser bar, and a four-link rear suspension with coil springs and a lateral rod along with a solid axle.

Depending on the market and grade level, the Innova could be configured as a two-row five-seater vehicle (such as in Taiwan), or a three-row vehicle with either eight seats or a more upscale seven-seat layout with captain seats for the second row.

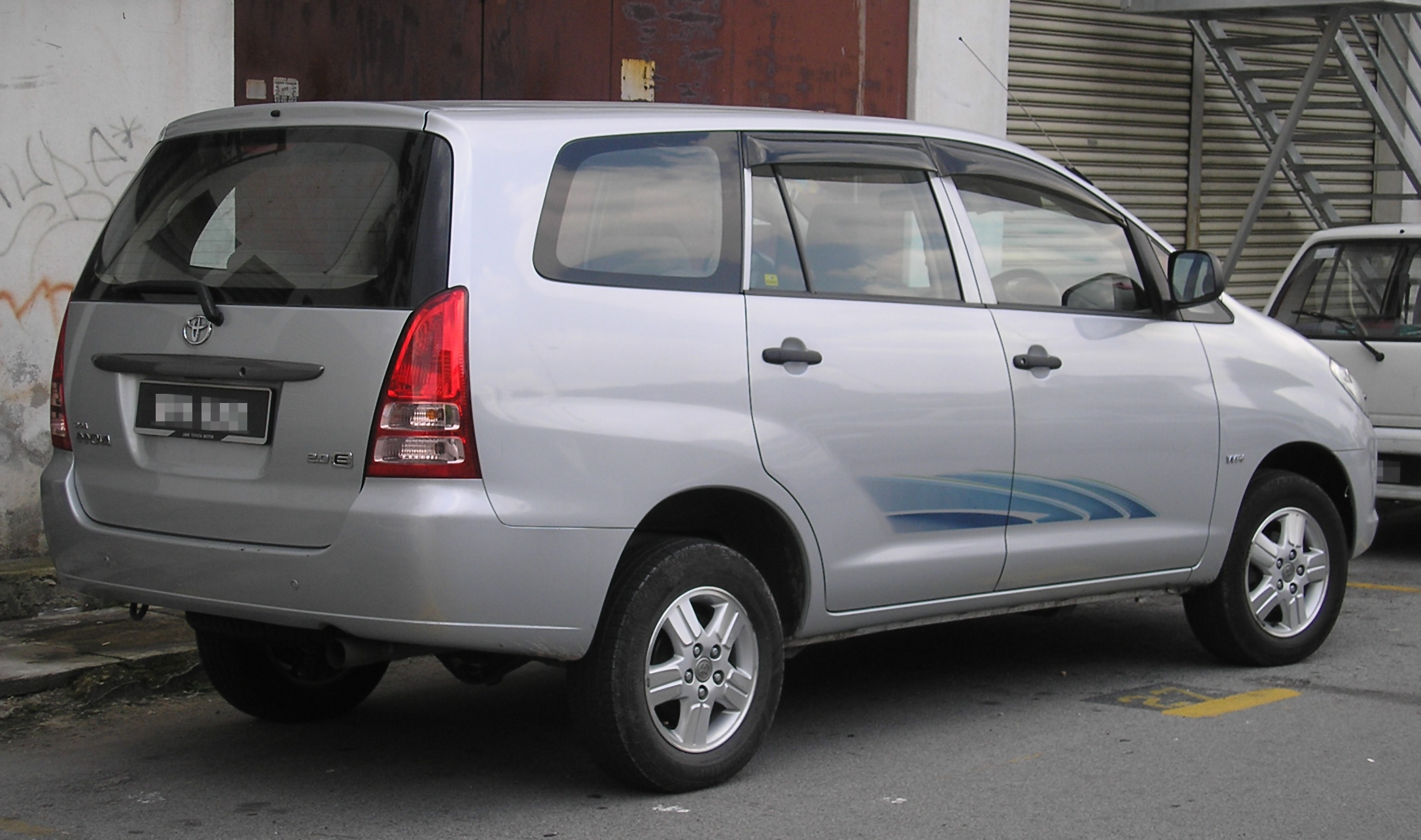
Innova 2.0 E (TGN40; pre-facelift, Malaysia)

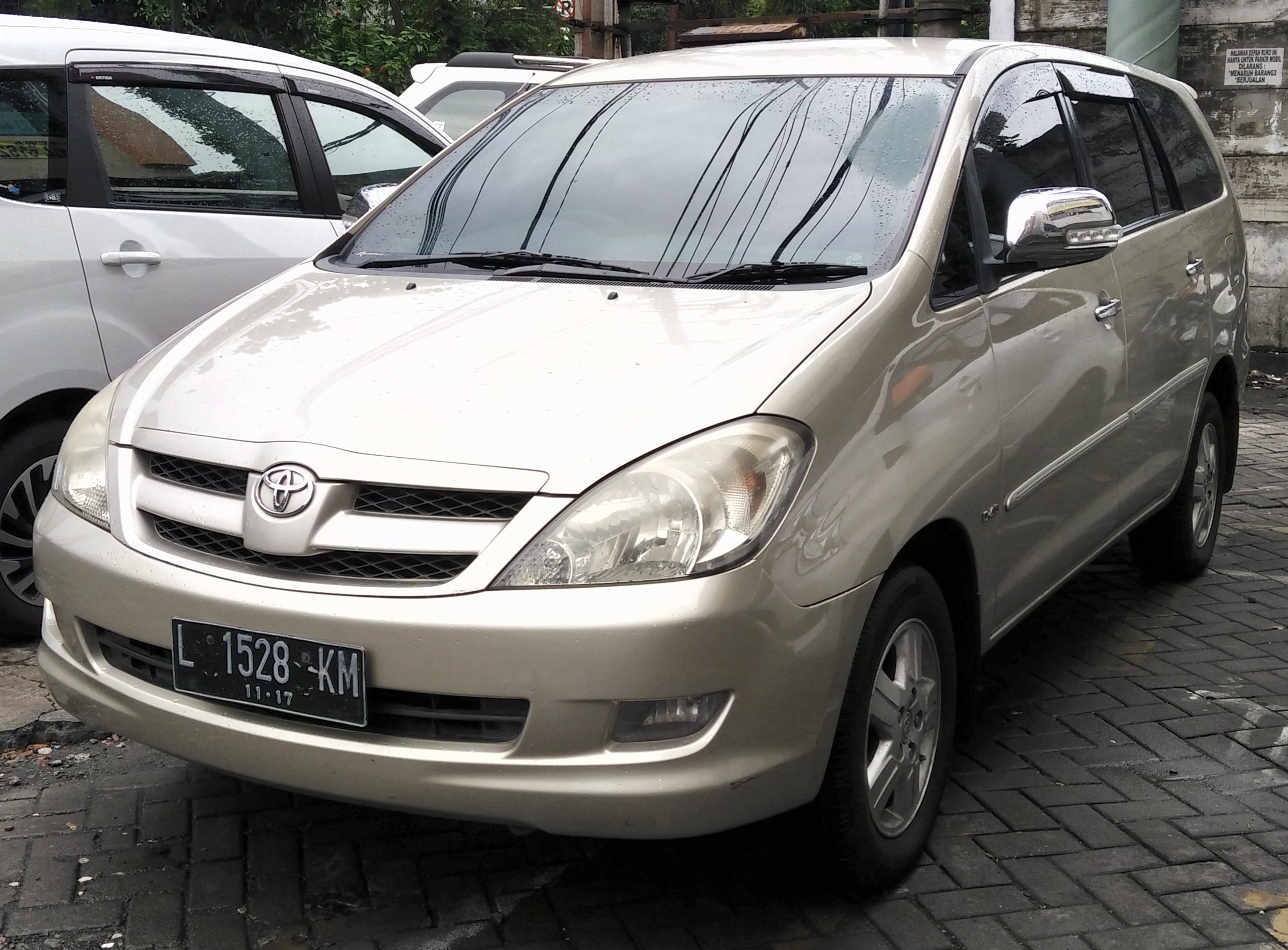
2006–2008 minor facelift

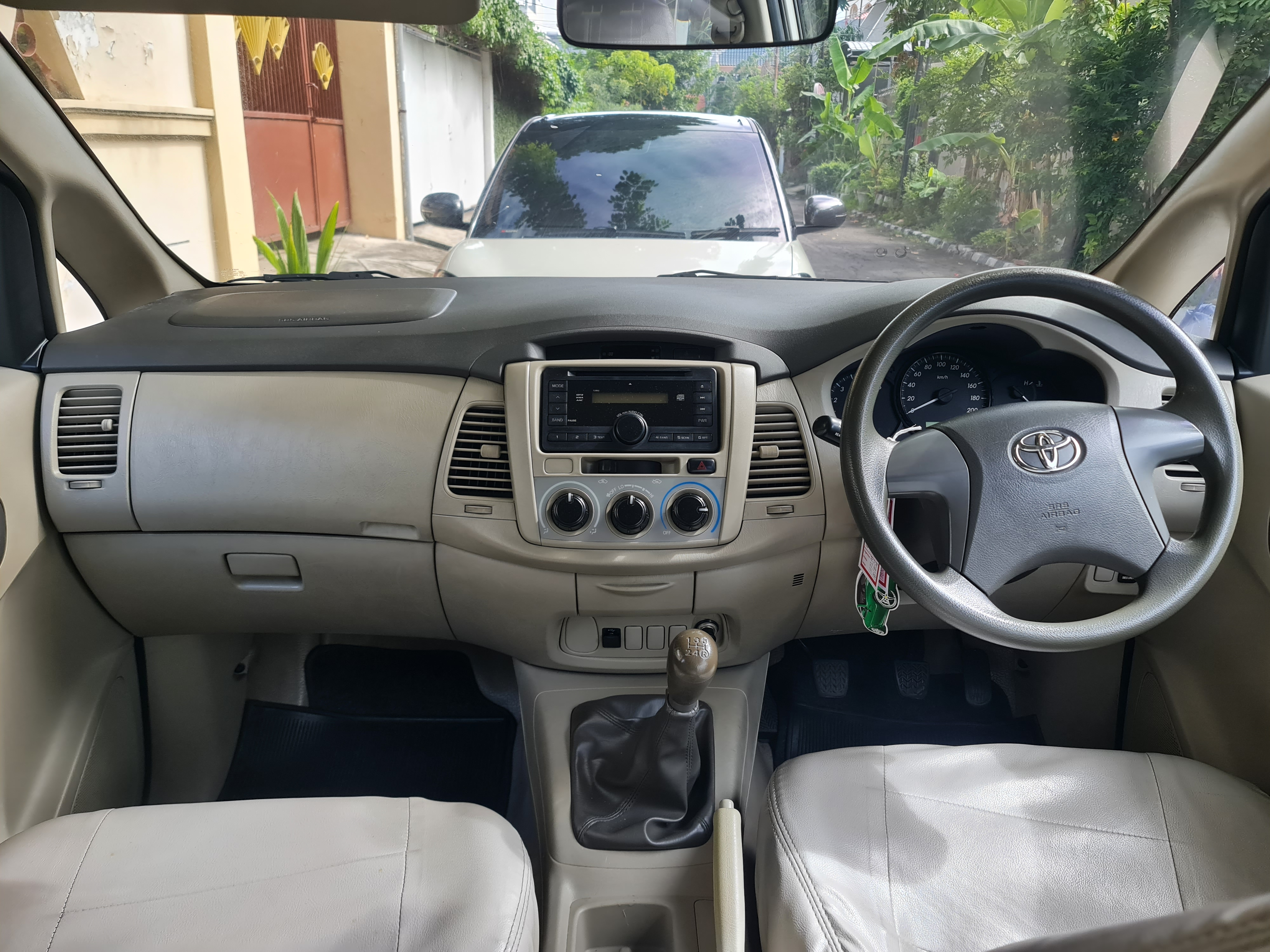
Interior (third facelift)

=== Updates ===
==== 2008 ====
The facelifted Innova debuted on 26 August 2008 in Indonesia. It featured a redesigned front and rear bumper, front grille, and rear taillights. It was also launched in the Philippines in November 2008 and in India on 28 January 2009. In August 2009, the E and G-type Kijang Innova received improvements, such as redesigned side body moulding, chrome ornaments on rear windshield and boot lid. The Luxury package was also introduced for the G and V type.

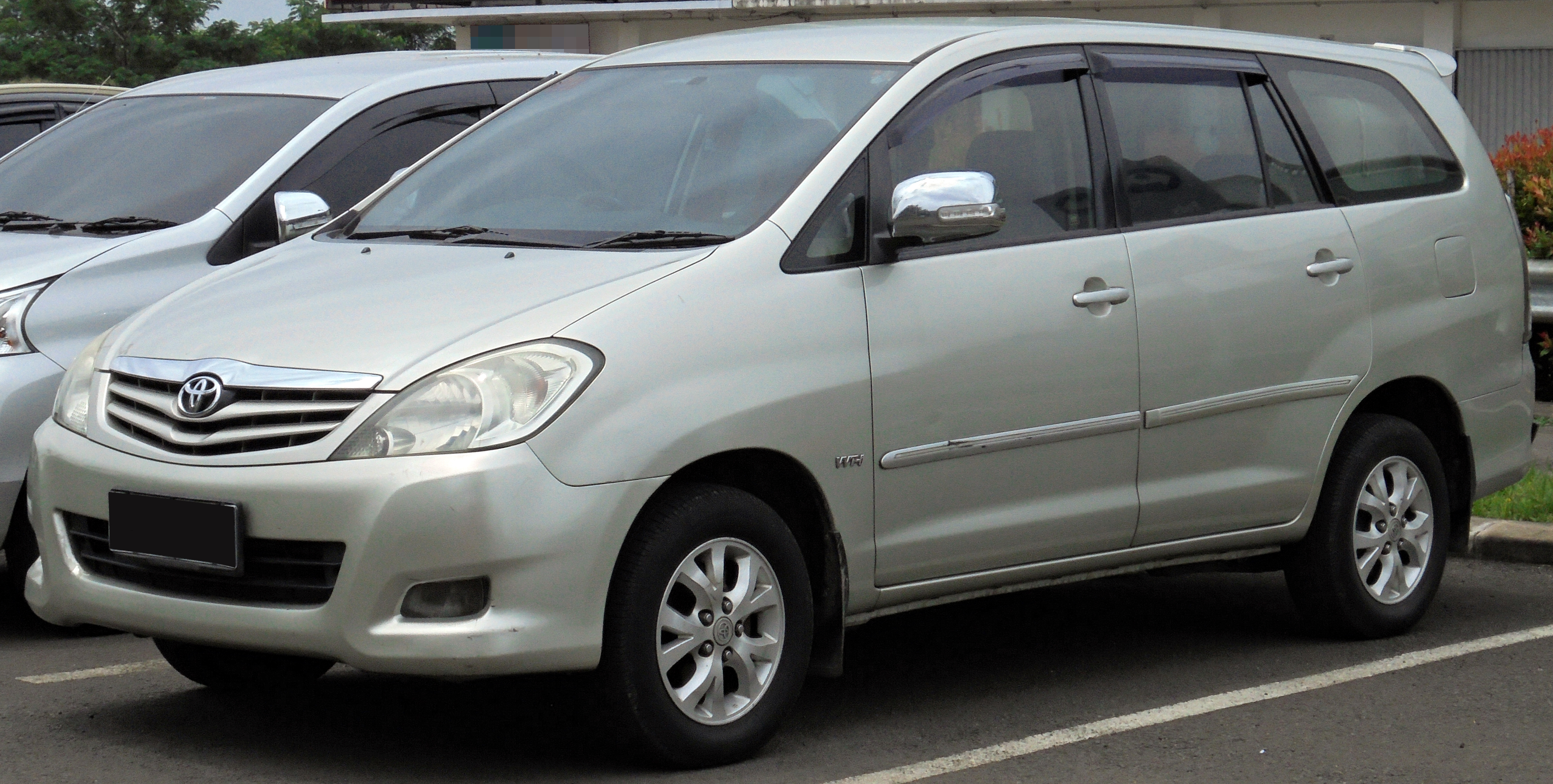
2009 Kijang Innova 2.0 G (TGN40; first facelift, Indonesia)

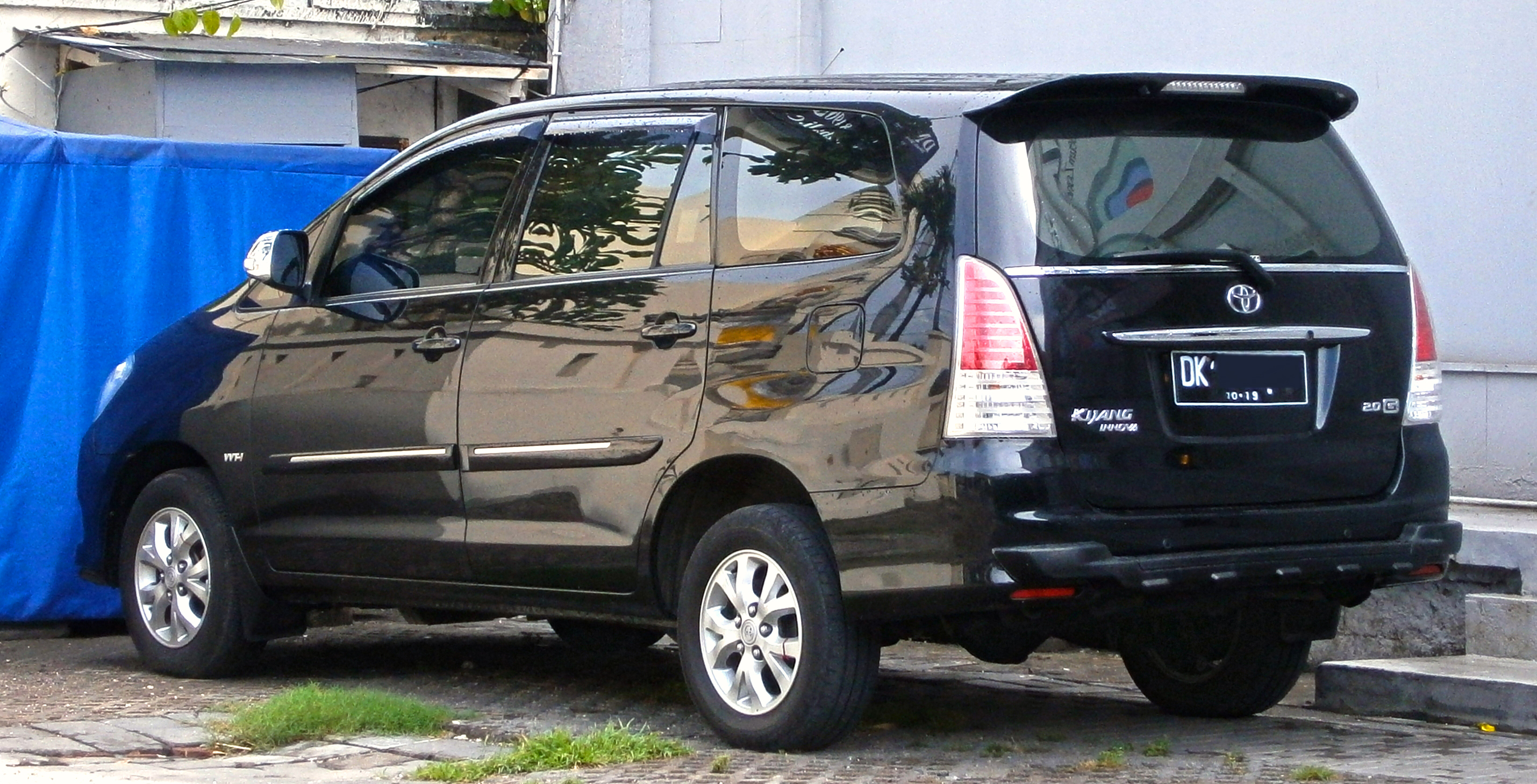
2009 Kijang Innova 2.0 G (TGN40; first facelift, August 2009 improvement, Indonesia)

==== 2011 ====
On 20 July 2011, Toyota launched the second facelift of the Innova in Indonesia. It featured redesigned headlights, grille, bonnet, bumpers, taillights and wheels. The interior was updated with an updated steering wheel, updated air-conditioning knobs (for all variants except V), and a revised centre console.

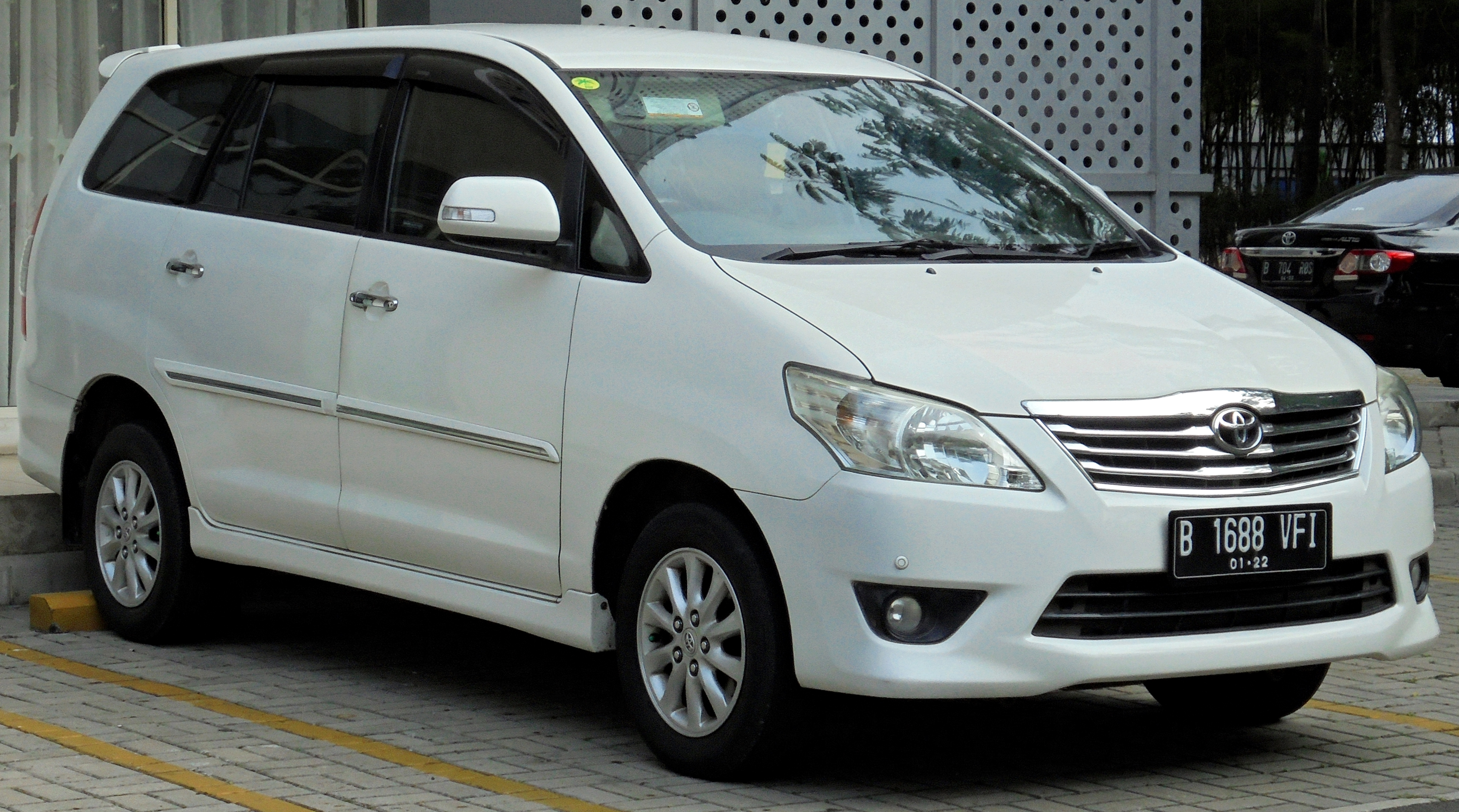
2012 Kijang Innova V (AN40; second facelift, Indonesia)

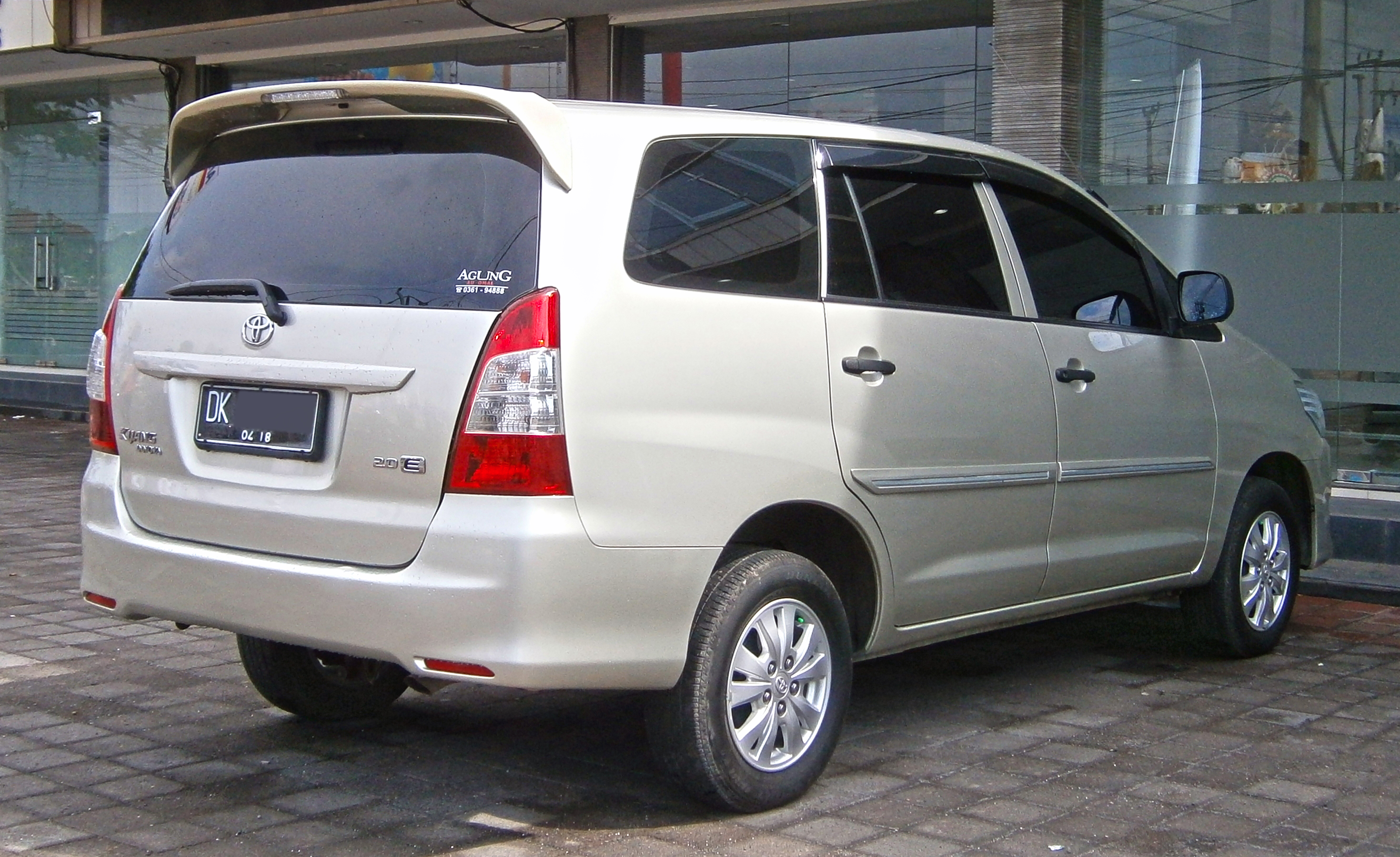
2013 Kijang Innova 2.0 E (TGN40; second facelift, Indonesia)

==== 2013 ====
The third facelift of the Innova debuted in August 2013 in Indonesia, which introduced a revised front bumper, boot garnish and equipment upgrades.

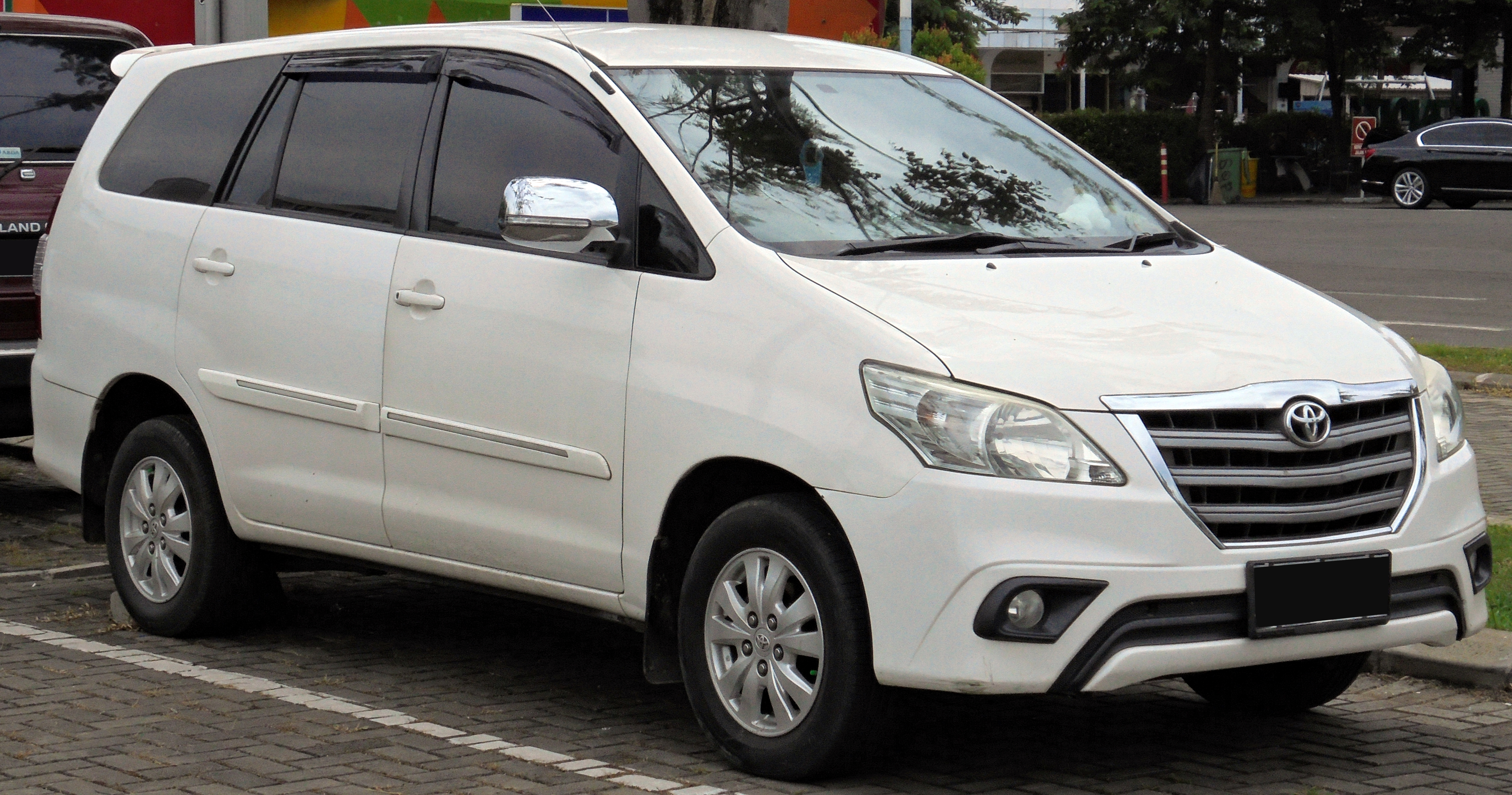
2014 Kijang Innova 2.0 G (TGN40; third facelift, Indonesia)

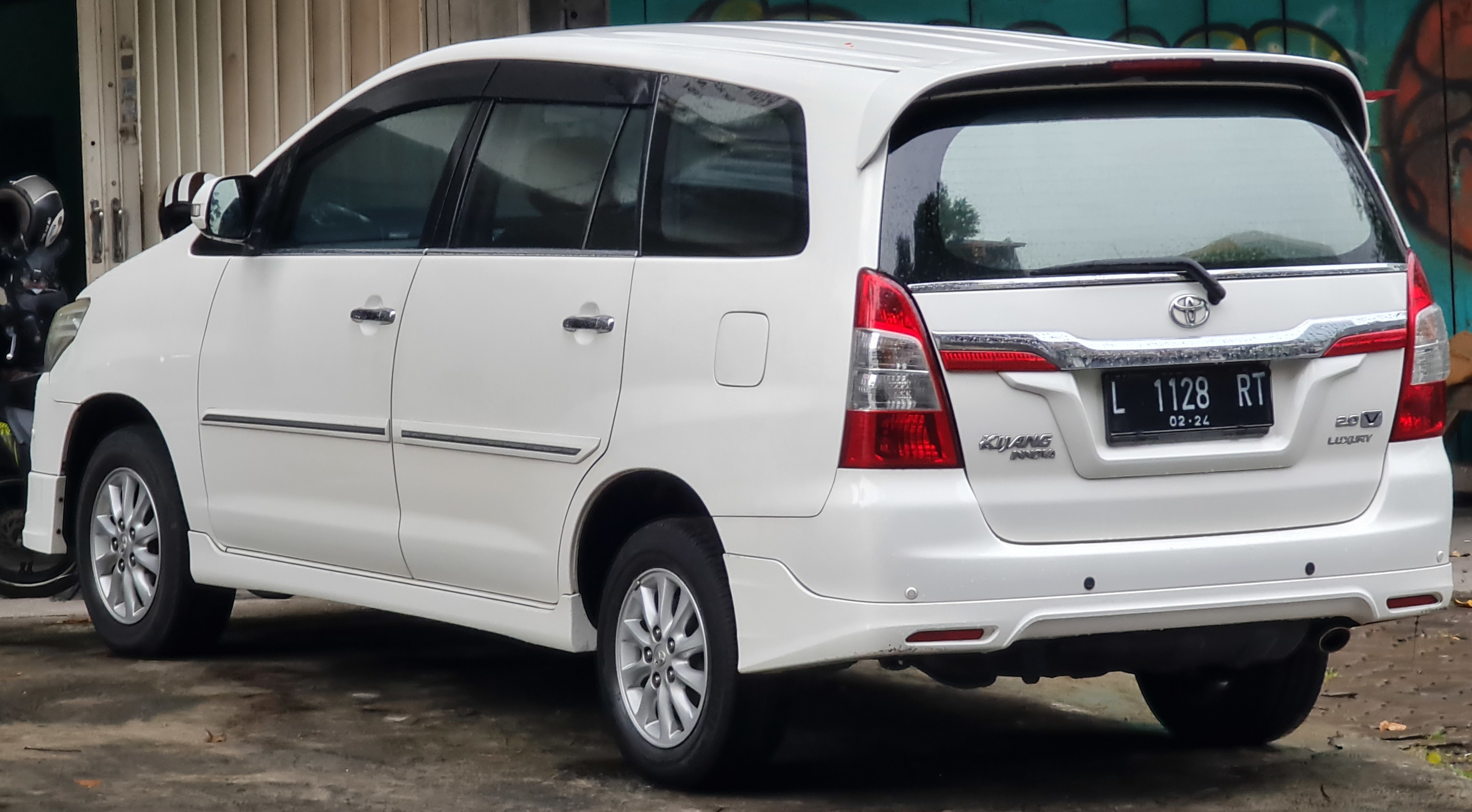
2014 Kijang Innova 2.0 V Luxury (TGN40; third facelift, Indonesia)

=== Markets ===
==== India ====
In India, the Innova was launched on 24 February 2005, replacing the Qualis. It was available with twelve variants. Three variants of the Innova came with a petrol engine option which was a 2.0-litre 1TR-FE engine with electronic fuel injection. The diesel variants are powered by a 2.5-litre 2KD-FTV engine. The available grades were E, G, GX and VX. In 2012, a "Z" trim was added, becoming the flagship grade above the VX. Toyota set an initial sales target of 45,000 units annually.

The Innova was sold in large numbers in India (where it is known as an MUV), primarily serving the tourist taxi market and fleet operations of large technology business process outsourcing companies.

In 2009, a facelift was introduced with exterior cosmetic changes, and the inclusion of an intercooler for the diesel engine.

A second facelift was introduced in 2012 at the 11th Auto Expo with an updated bumper design, grille, headlights, and newly designed alloy wheels. Steering-mounted controls for the audio and climate control system became an option.

The first-generation Innova received an update for the Indian market in 2015. With this update, all variants gained dual airbags as standard, and there were cosmetic changes such as dark grey two-tone alloy wheels, a wood-finished steering wheel, redesigned leather seats, and an oak interior colour. Rear HVAC outlets became standard as part of this update.

==== Indonesia ====
The Kijang Innova was introduced in Indonesia on 1 September 2004. It was initially available in E, G and V grade levels, equipped with either a 2.0-litre 1TR-FE petrol engine or a 2.5-litre 2KD-FTV turbo-diesel engine. Manual transmission was standard in all grades, while the automatic transmission was only offered in G and V grades. The E and G grades retained the three-spoke steering wheel design from the second-facelift fourth-generation Kijang and first-generation Vios, while the V grade shared its new four-spoke steering wheel design from the E120 series Corolla Altis, first-generation Alphard, facelifted J100 series Land Cruiser and the facelifted XV30 series Camry.

In January 2005, the 2.7 V grade was released as the flagship model. It was equipped with a 2.7-litre 2TR-FE engine (later also used on petrol variants of the Toyota Fortuner), dual airbags, ABS, and a seven-seat layout, offered only with the automatic transmission. It was discontinued in 2007 due to low demand caused by its relatively high price.

In February 2006 a limited edition was added. The limited edition was offered in V Luxury, V Xtra, and G Cruise. The V Xtra grade was released with equipment levels similar to the 2.7 V grade, while the G Cruiser based on V Xtra with additional accessories and Cruiser side decals. Both the V Luxury and G Cruiser models were sold during 2006.

In January 2008, the G grade could be optioned as a seven-seater with the "Captain Seat" sub-grade.

The facelifted Kijang Innova was released on 26 August 2008 with an updated front bumper and grille design, new taillights, and redesigned wheels. At the 17th Indonesia International Motor Show in July 2009, the G Luxury and V Luxury grades were introduced as replacements for the V Xtra grade. In August 2009, the petrol-only J grade was introduced as the base model.

On 20 July 2011, the Kijang Innova received a second facelift. Changes included an updated front clip design, headlights and taillights, redesigned wheels, and an updated centre dashboard design.

On 19 August 2013, the third facelift of the Kijang Innova was launched. This facelifted Kijang Innova was sometimes nicknamed the "Kijang Innova Barong" in Indonesia due to its similar appearance to the Balinese mythology character. Changes consisted of a larger grille, redesigned bumpers and an updated boot garnish. This facelift was not applied to the J grade and still using the 2011 facelift.

In August 2014, the Kijang Innova was updated for the G and V grades with redesigned alloy wheels, and a redesigned rear bodykit for the Luxury grades.

==== Malaysia ====
In Malaysia, the Innova was launched on 27 May 2005, replacing the Unser and was offered in two variants: the E and G, both powered by the 2.0-litre 1TR-FE petrol engine with VVT-i. Power was paired with either a five-speed manual transmission or a four-speed automatic transmission.

==== Philippines ====
In the Philippines, the Innova was launched on 11 March 2005, replacing the Revo and was offered in four variants: the J without power features and steel wheels with hubcups; the E with power features and alloy wheels; the G with carrying over features from the E trim but with fabric seats and airbags; and V, introduced in late 2006 with leather seats, captain chairs on the middle row, and a high-end audio system. All variants were powered with either 2.0-litre 1TR-FE petrol engine with VVT-i or 2.5-litre 2KD-FTV turbo diesel engine with D-4D. Transmission choices were either 5-speed manual (for J, E and G trims) or 4-speed automatic (for E, G and V trims).

In 2008, the first facelift version was introduced, with the same four variants as the pre-facelift model; featuring newly design of front and rear bumpers, front grille, taillights, upgraded interiors and newly wheel designs for E, G and V trims. In 2010, the Sport Runner trim was introduced. Based on the E trim, it features sportier body kits, fog lights and SR wheels. It was only offered with 2KD-FTV turbo diesel engine and paired with either 5-speed manual or 4-speed automatic transmissions. Colors available were Bronze or Black. In 2012, the second facelift version was introduced; featuring redesigned front bumper, newly headlights and taillights, newly engine covers for both VVT-i and D-4D variants, newly wheel designs and side mirrors (for G and V trims), upgraded interiors and their audio systems. In 2014, another facelift version was took placed, except for J trim; featuring front bumper and rear tailgate. The E trim was added with a rear demister and has same wheel designs as the G and V trims.

In June 2015, TMP offering a limited-edition 1 Million Innova; featuring GPS navigation, rear spoiler, 1 Million badge, and Jade Green color. The total sold of Innova first-generation in the Philippines has over 140,000 units.

==== South Africa ====
In South Africa, the Innova was launched in its second facelift form on 9 October 2011, sitting between the Verso and the smaller Avanza. Equipped with a 2.7-litre engine mated exclusively to a 5-speed manual, it was offered with an eight-seater variant and a more upscale seven-seater. The model was not replaced with the second-generation model upon its discontinuation due to poor sales and slumping demand for MPVs in the market.

==== Taiwan ====
In Taiwan, the Innova was launched on 4 July 2007, replacing the Zace Surf, which was not compliant with the stricter emissions regulations. Positioned as a recreational vehicle and a commercial vehicle, the Taiwanese-market Innova was offered only in a two-row, five-seat configuration. Initial models were equipped with the 2.7-litre petrol engine with J, E, G and Z grade levels. Monthly sales were targeted at 900 units. In November 2011, the 2.7-litre engine was replaced by the 2.0-litre engine, with price reductions and a monthly sales target of 700 units. Retaining the same initial exterior styling without a facelift, the vehicle gained a black interior colour, replacing beige. Production continued without significant changes until 2016, when it was discontinued without a direct successor.

==== Vietnam ====
In Vietnam, the Innova was launched on 10 January 2006, replacing the Zace. In its first year, the Innova sold 9,934 units with a share of the overall car market of 23 percent, a record in the country.

=== Powertrain ===
The first-generation Innova was powered by either a 2.0-litre petrol 100 kW (134 hp; 136 PS) 1TR-FE engine with VVT-i, a 2.7-litre petrol 118 kW (158 hp; 160 PS) 2TR-FE engine with VVT-i, or a 2.5-litre 102 PS (75 kW; 101 hp) 2KD-FTV D-4D turbocharged diesel engine.

The turbocharged diesel 2KD-FTV engine which produces 75 kW (101 hp; 102 PS) and 260 N⋅m (26.5 kg⋅m; 192 lb⋅ft) of torque when mated to the four-speed automatic transmission and 200 N⋅m (20.4 kg⋅m; 148 lb⋅ft) when mated to the five-speed manual transmission. Petrol versions were also available with five-speed manual or four-speed automatic transmissions.

Type	Engine code	Displacement	Power	Torque	Transmission	Model code	Layout	Calendar years
Petrol	1TR-FE	1,998 cc (2.0 L) I4 with VVT-i	100 kW (134 hp; 136 PS) @ 5,600 rpm	182 N⋅m (18.6 kg⋅m; 134 lb⋅ft) @ 4,000 rpm	5-speed manual; 4-speed automatic	TGN40	RWD	2004–2016
Petrol	2TR-FE	2,693 cc (2.7 L) I4 with VVT-i	118 kW (158 hp; 160 PS) @ 5,200 rpm	241 N⋅m (24.6 kg⋅m; 178 lb⋅ft) @ 3,800 rpm	5-speed manual; 4-speed automatic	TGN41	RWD	2005–2016
Diesel	2KD-FTV	2,494 cc (2.5 L) turbocharged I4	75 kW (101 hp; 102 PS) @ 3,600 rpm	200 N⋅m (20.4 kg⋅m; 148 lb⋅ft) @ 1,400–3,200 rpm	5-speed manual	KUN40	RWD	2004–2016
Diesel	2KD-FTV	2,494 cc (2.5 L) turbocharged I4	75 kW (101 hp; 102 PS) @ 3,600 rpm	260 N⋅m (26.5 kg⋅m; 192 lb⋅ft) @ 1,600–2,400 rpm	4-speed automatic	KUN40	RWD	2004–2016

== Second generation (AN140; 2015) ==
Second generation
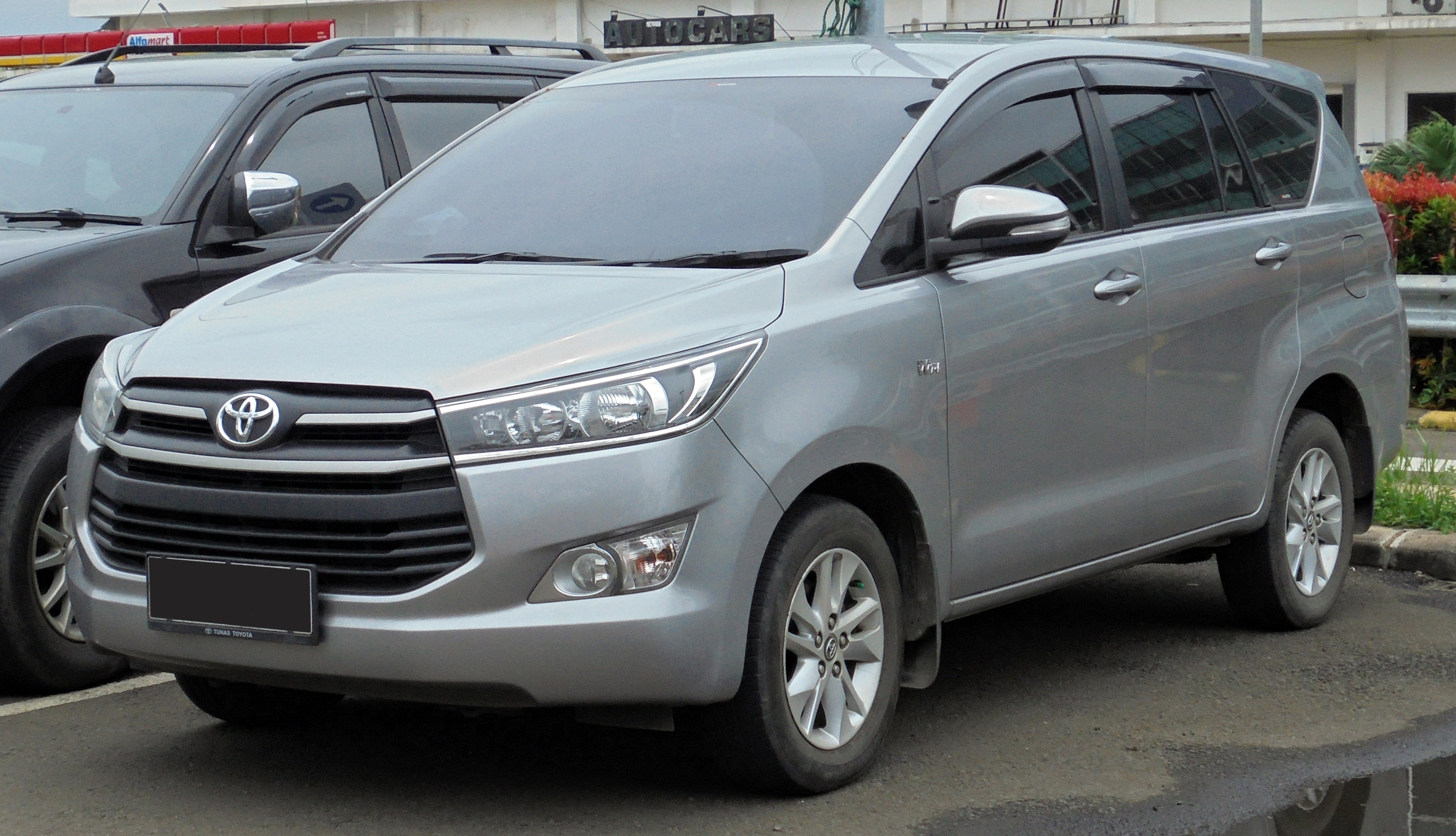
- 2017 Kijang Innova 2.0 G (TGN140; pre-facelift, Indonesia)

Overview
- Model code: AN140
- Also called: Toyota Kijang Innova (Indonesia)
- Production: November 2015 – present
- Assembly: Indonesia: Karawang (TMMIN, Plant 1); India: Bidadi (TKM); Philippines: Santa Rosa, Laguna (TMP); Vietnam: Phúc Yên (TMV); Malaysia: Shah Alam (UMW)
- Designer: Masayuki Sugiura, Naohiko Suzuki and Hisataka Tokizane; Adam Ty Dean Smith and Anthony Chin-Pang Cheung (facelift)

Body and chassis
- Class: Mid-size MPV
- Layout: Front-engine, rear-wheel-drive
- Platform: Toyota IMV platform
- Chassis: Body-on-frame
- Related: Toyota Fortuner/SW4 (AN150/160); Toyota Hilux (AN120/130); Toyota Hilux Champ

Powertrain
- Engine: Petrol: 2.0 L 1TR-FE Dual VVT-i I4; 2.7 L 2TR-FE Dual VVT-i I4; Diesel: 2.4 L 2GD-FTV turbo I4; 2.8 L 1GD-FTV turbo I4
- Transmission: 5-speed R151 manual; 6-speed RC60 manual; 6-speed AC60 automatic

Dimensions
- Wheelbase: 2,750 mm (108.3 in)
- Length: 4,735 mm (186.4 in)
- Width: 1,830 mm (72.0 in)
- Height: 1,795 mm (70.7 in)
- Kerb weight: 1,700–1,930 kg (3,747.9–4,254.9 lb)

The second-generation Innova, designated AN140 series, was launched in November 2015 in Indonesia. Its introduction followed the other vehicles from the IMV family, the Hilux and the Fortuner, which received newer generations in May and July respectively. The second-generation Innova featured an improved platform and newer diesel engines, with development led by executive chief engineer Hiroki Nakajima. According to Nakajima, the second-generation Innova aimed to be a "crossover MPV", in the sense of combining the essence of an MPV with the "tough, emotional elements" of an SUV.

It is 150 mm (5.9 in) longer, 55 mm (2.2 in) wider, 35 mm (1.4 in) taller, and around 210–290 kg (460–640 lb) heavier than its predecessor. In the interior, it gains larger headroom for the first and third row occupants, and the seating distance between occupants is increased by 19 mm (0.7 in). According to Toyota Motor Manufacturing Indonesia (TMMIN) director of production engineering Nandi Julianto, the second-generation Innova shares "only 5% of its components with the outgoing model, which is, apparently, a few bolts and screws". While keeping the same wheelbase as the previous generation, the Innova rides on a revised body-on-frame chassis that has been tweaked with a thicker side rail to offer better strength and structural rigidity.

The second-generation Innova retains the same suspension setup as the first generation. The low-end variants rode on 16-inch alloy wheels, while the top-end variant received 17-inch alloy wheels. It could be optioned with seven airbags, stability control, and hill-start assist.

The second-generation Innova is fully manufactured in Indonesia and India, and also assembled from knock-down kits in Malaysia, the Philippines, and Vietnam.

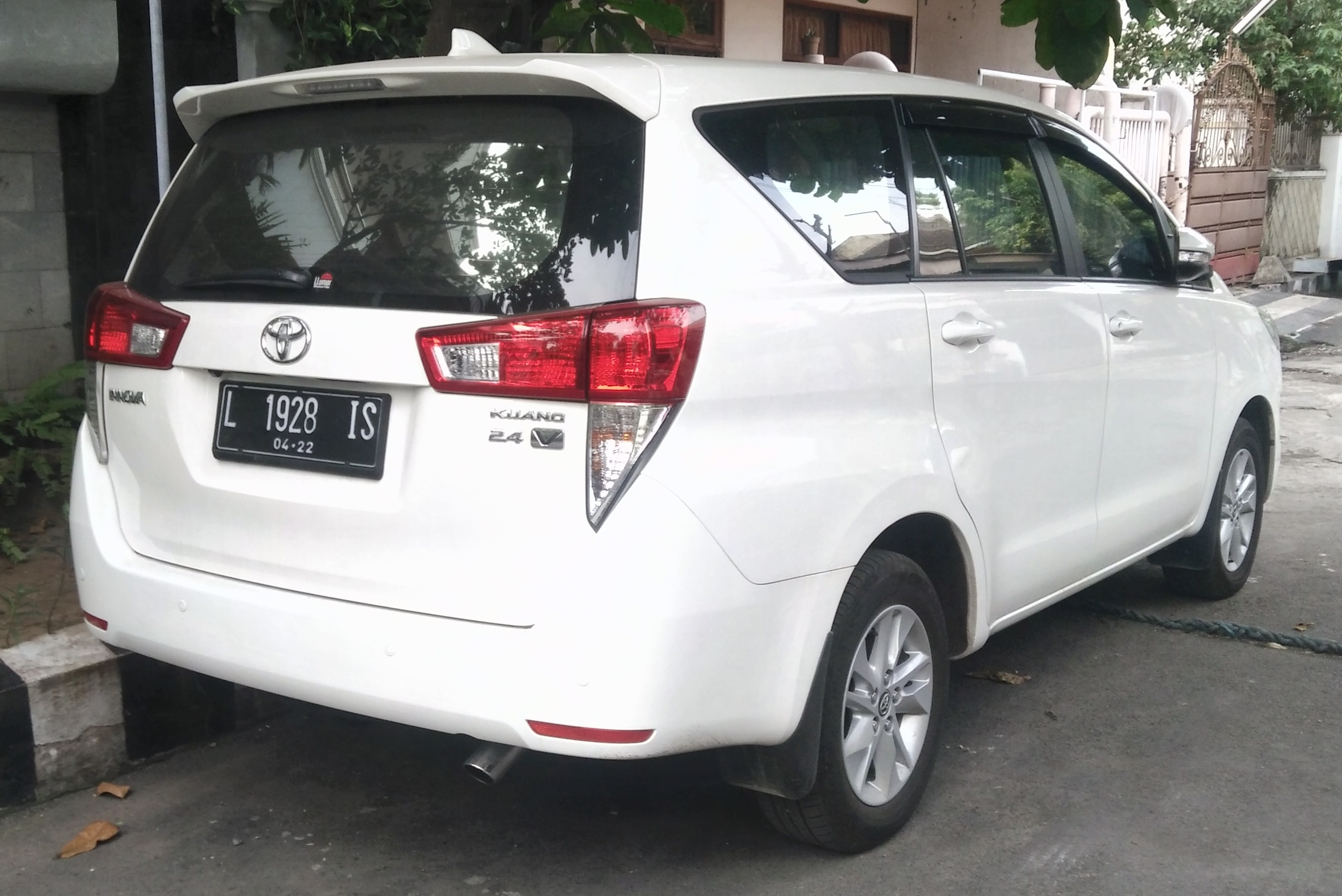
Rear view

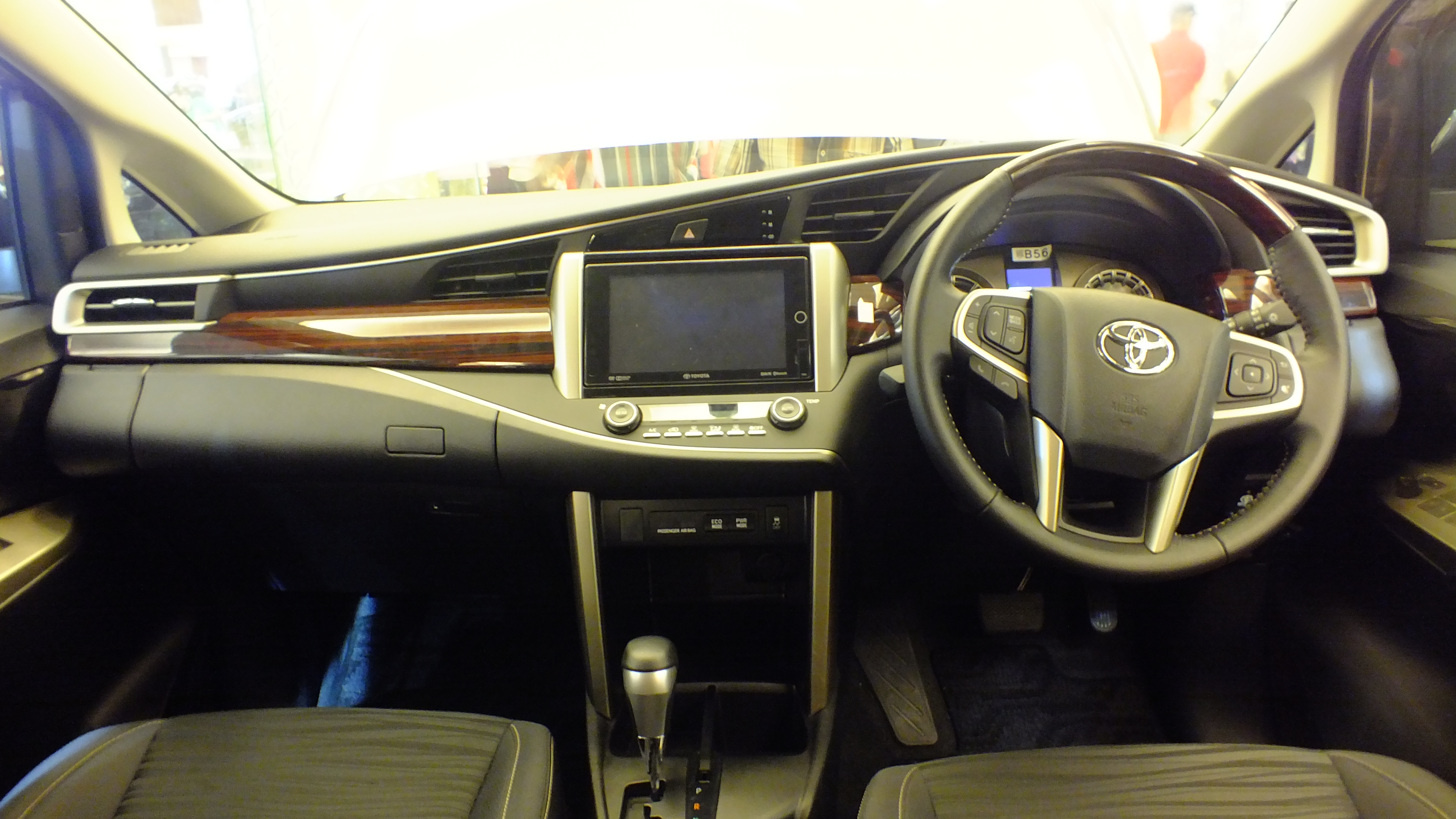
Interior

=== Markets ===
==== India ====
For the Indian market, the second-generation Innova was showcased at Auto Expo in February 2016 and marketed as the Innova Crysta. Exclusive to this model is a 2.8-litre 1GD-FTV inline-four turbocharged diesel engine. The Innova Crysta launched in May 2016 with two diesel engine options: the 2.8-litre unit and a 2.4-litre diesel. The 2.8-litre engine received the six-speed automatic transmission with sequential shift, while the 2.4-litre received the five-speed manual transmission. In August 2016, the 2.7-litre petrol engine option was introduced, in response to the ban on diesel vehicles with engine capacities over 2,000 cc in Delhi and NCR. The petrol engine is mated to either a 5-speed manual or a 6-speed automatic transmission with sequential shift according to different grade levels.

Grade levels are G, V, and the flagship Z. In May 2017, Toyota launched the Innova Touring Sport, which features exterior elements from the Indonesian-market Kijang Innova Venturer. The lineup received an update in October 2017 with a 6-speed manual transmission.

In 2020, the 2.8-litre 1GD-FTV engine was discontinued for the Indian market due to the implementation of the Bharat Stage 6 emission standard. The 2.8-litre automatic variant was subsequently replaced with the 2.4-litre automatic variant. However, the 2.4-litre 2GD-FTV diesel produces the same torque figures as its 2.8-litre predecessor: 360 N⋅m (36.7 kg⋅m; 266 lb⋅ft) in the automatic variant and 343 N⋅m (35.0 kg⋅m; 253 lb⋅ft) in the manual variant. To comply with the Bharat Stage 6 emission norms, the engine is equipped with a DPF + SCR system for exhaust after-treatment, which requires the use of diesel exhaust fluid.

The updated Innova Crysta was launched in India on 24 November 2020, with changes mainly to the front styling.

The Innova Crysta was reintroduced to be sold alongside the newer Innova HyCross in January 2023 with a restyled front end. The petrol engine option and automatic transmission was dropped, leaving the 2.4-litre diesel engine with manual transmission.

==== Indonesia ====
The second-generation Kijang Innova (colloquially known as "Kijang Innova Reborn") was launched in Jakarta, Indonesia on 23 November 2015. Initial grade levels of the Indonesian market Kijang Innova are the base G, the mid-level V and the flagship Q grade. As the Kijang Innova is moving upmarket to make room for the second-generation Sienta, the J and E grades from the previous generation were removed. The engine options in the Indonesian market are the 2.0-litre 1TR-FE petrol and 2.4-litre 2GD-FTV common rail turbo-diesel.

On 16 January 2017, the diesel-engined Q grade was replaced by the Venturer grade (available in both petrol and diesel engines). It has a more pronounced crossover SUV-inspired look with the inclusion of aerokits and black 17-inch alloy wheels. It is also equipped with leather upholstery and captain seats. The grade omitted the "Kijang" badge and was marketed separately from the lesser grades.

On 10 August 2017, the Kijang Innova received a minor update. For the G grade, the plastic grille ornament was replaced with a chrome grille ornament, while the V grade received LED projector headlights. The 2.0 Q grade received 17-inch alloy wheels from the discontinued Q diesel grade. This updated Kijang Innova was introduced at the 25th Gaikindo Indonesia International Auto Show.

On 2 August 2018, the petrol engine on the Kijang Innova was updated to comply with the Euro 4 emission standards. It was introduced during the 26th Gaikindo Indonesia International Auto Show.

On 17 August 2020, a limited-production TRD Sportivo variant based on the G and V diesel grades was introduced. Only 2,632 units were produced.

The facelift model of the Kijang Innova was released on 15 October 2020. The Q grade was removed from the lineup and replaced by the Luxury variant of the G and V grades with captain seats, marking the revival of the Luxury variants of the G and V grades after a four-year, 11-month hiatus. Vehicle stability control and hill-start assist became standard on all grades.

To commemorate the 50th anniversary of Toyota Astra Motor, a limited-edition variant of the Kijang Innova was made available in April 2021. Only 50 units were sold, consisting of 30 units based on the 2.0 V Luxury grade and 20 units based on the 2.4 Venturer grade, both with an automatic transmission and painted in Pearl White. Features include darker alloy wheels, a gold sticker on both sides of the exterior, a special tuned JBL audio system, brown leather seats and captain seats.

On 31 March 2022, the diesel engine on the Kijang Innova was updated to comply with the Euro 4 emission standards. It was introduced during the 29th Indonesia International Motor Show.

Since November 2022, with the introduction of the third-generation model, the manual transmission 2.0 G and 2.4 G grades initially became the only second-generation Kijang Innova variants sold, available not only to fleet markets but also to retail customers by spot order. The diesel variant with an automatic transmission was reintroduced in March 2023.

In December 2025, the 2.0 G variant with a manual transmission was omitted from the lineup.

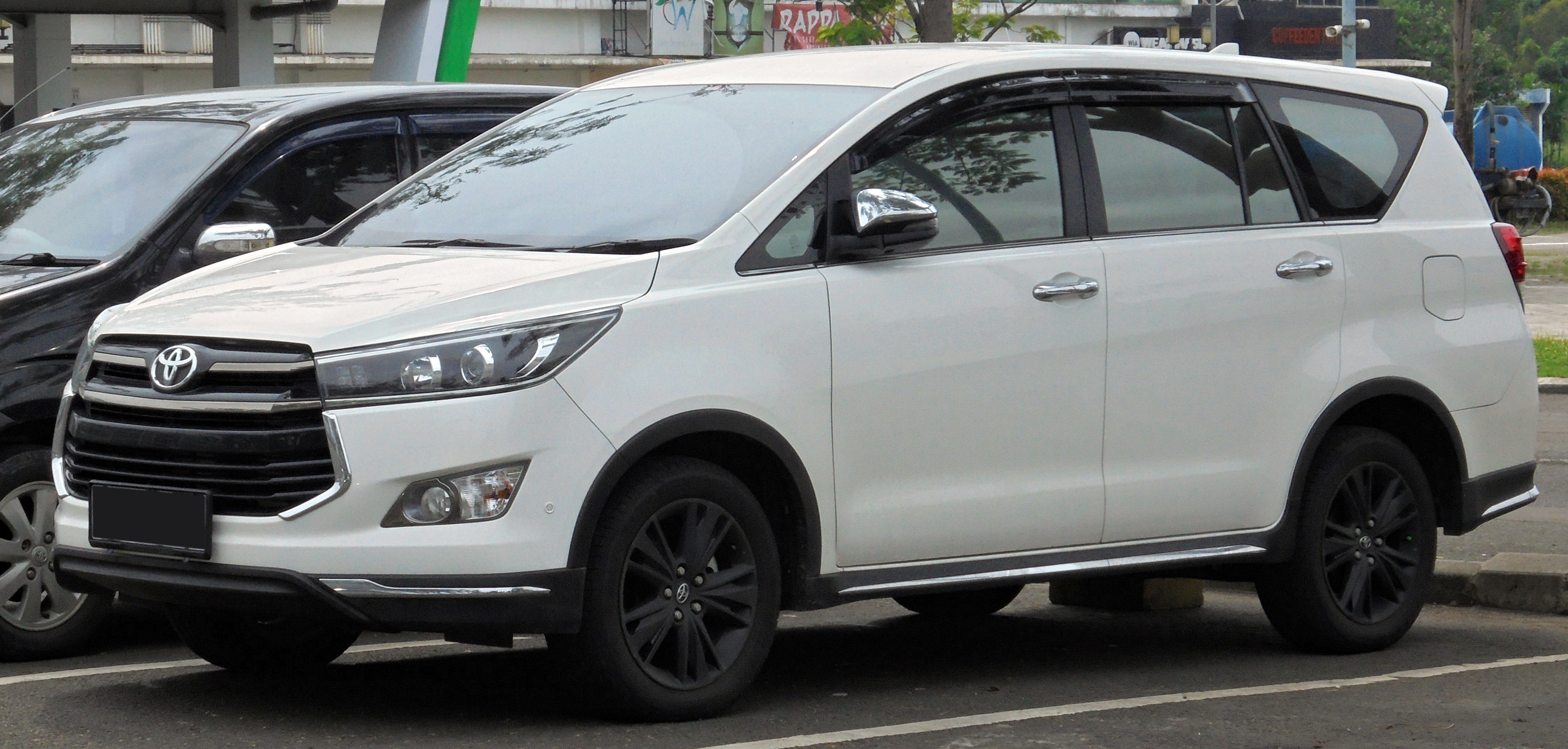
2018 Kijang Innova 2.4 Venturer (GUN142; pre-facelift, Indonesia)

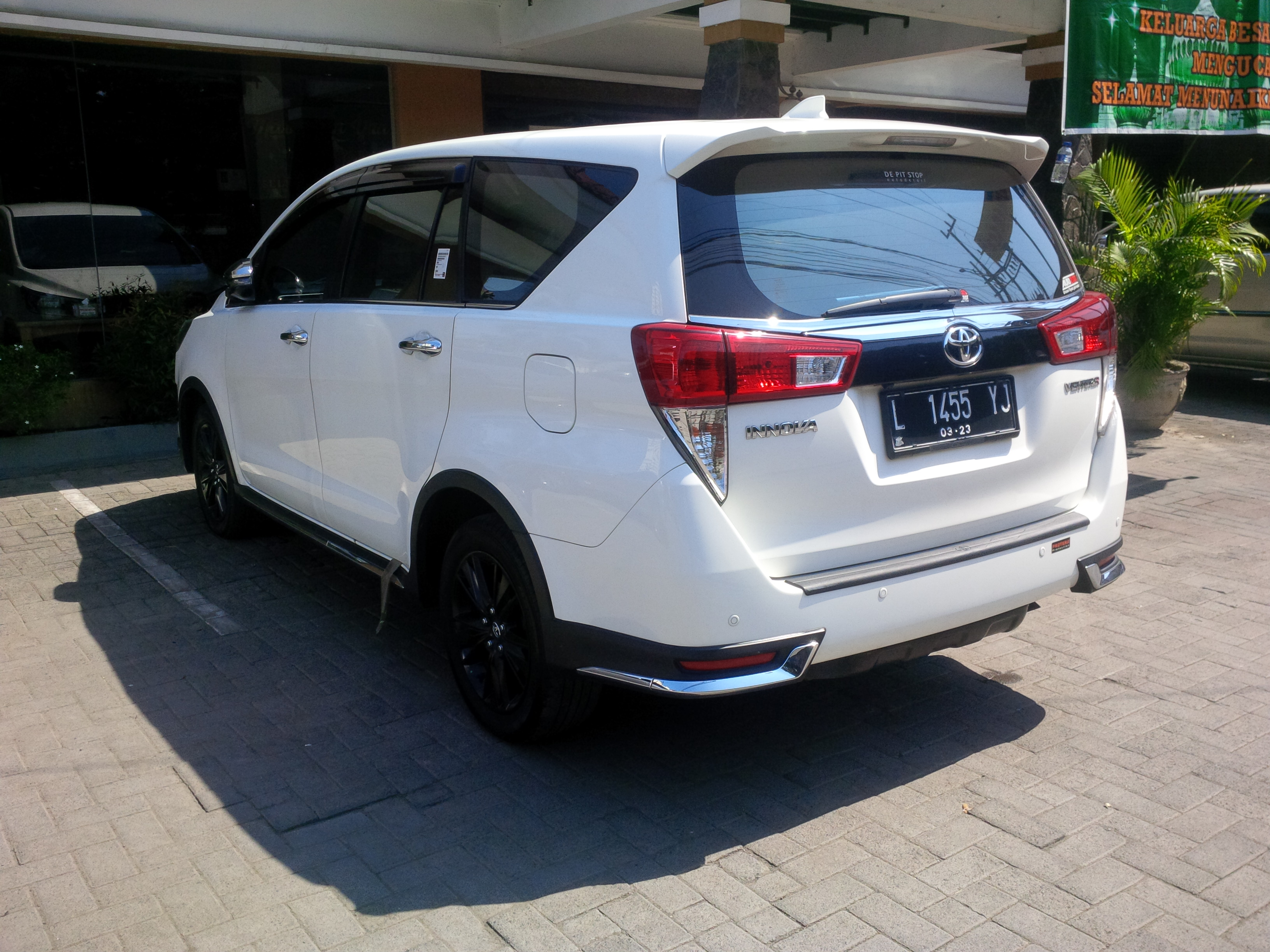
2018 Kijang Innova 2.4 Venturer (GUN142; pre-facelift, Indonesia)

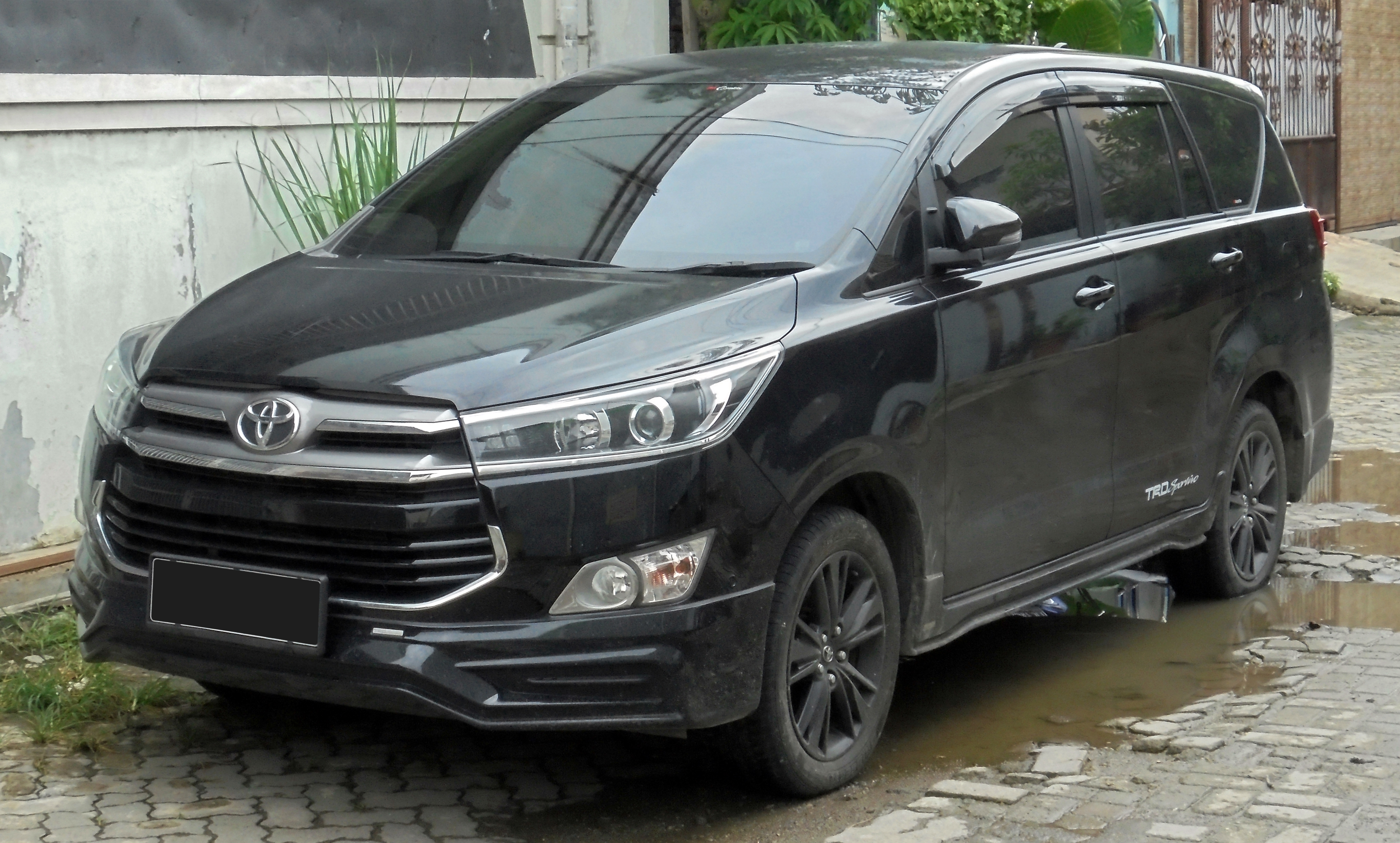
2020 Kijang Innova 2.4 V TRD Sportivo (GUN142; pre-facelift, Indonesia)

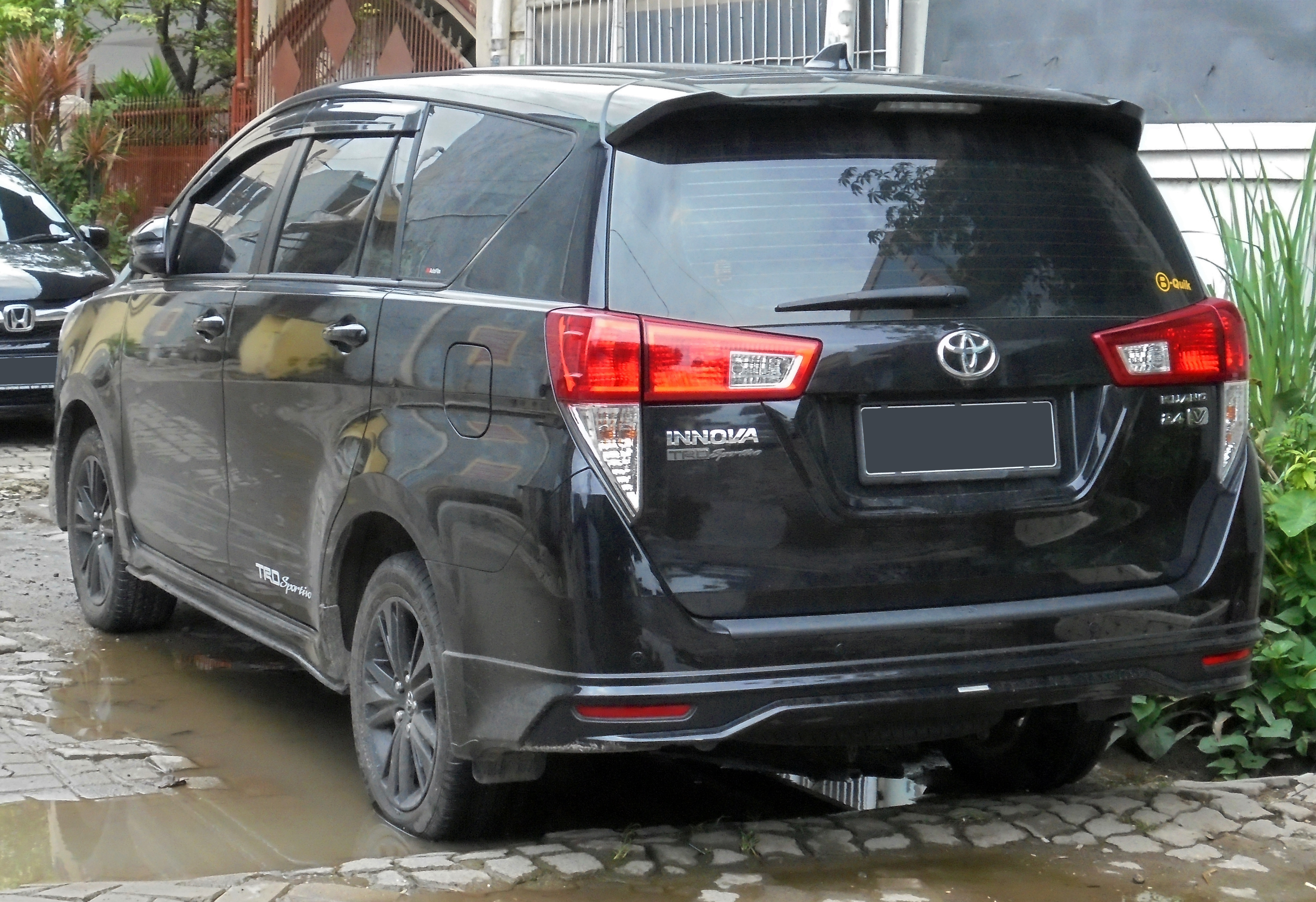
2020 Kijang Innova 2.4 V TRD Sportivo (GUN142; pre-facelift, Indonesia)

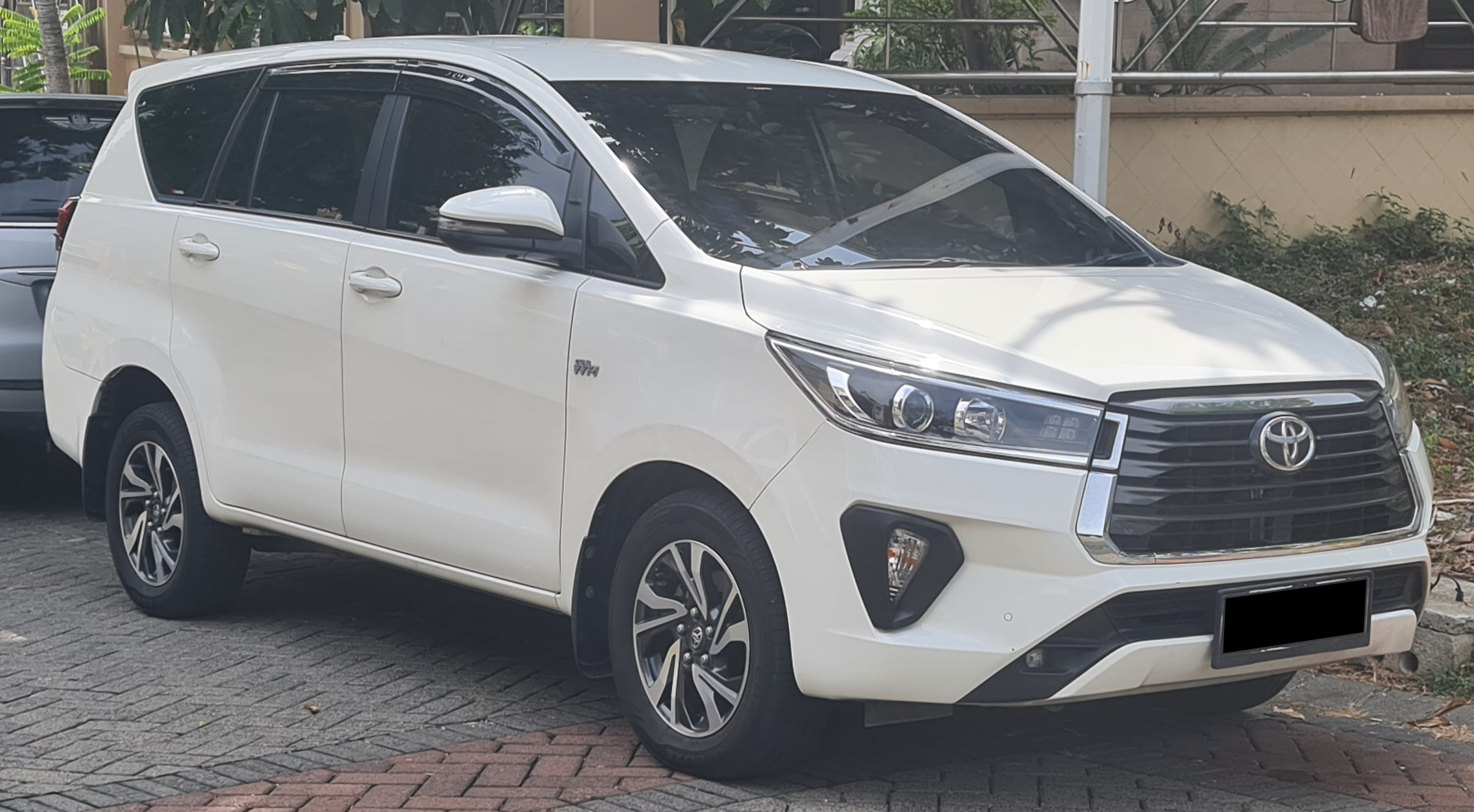
2021 Kijang Innova 2.0 V Luxury (TGN140; facelift, Indonesia)

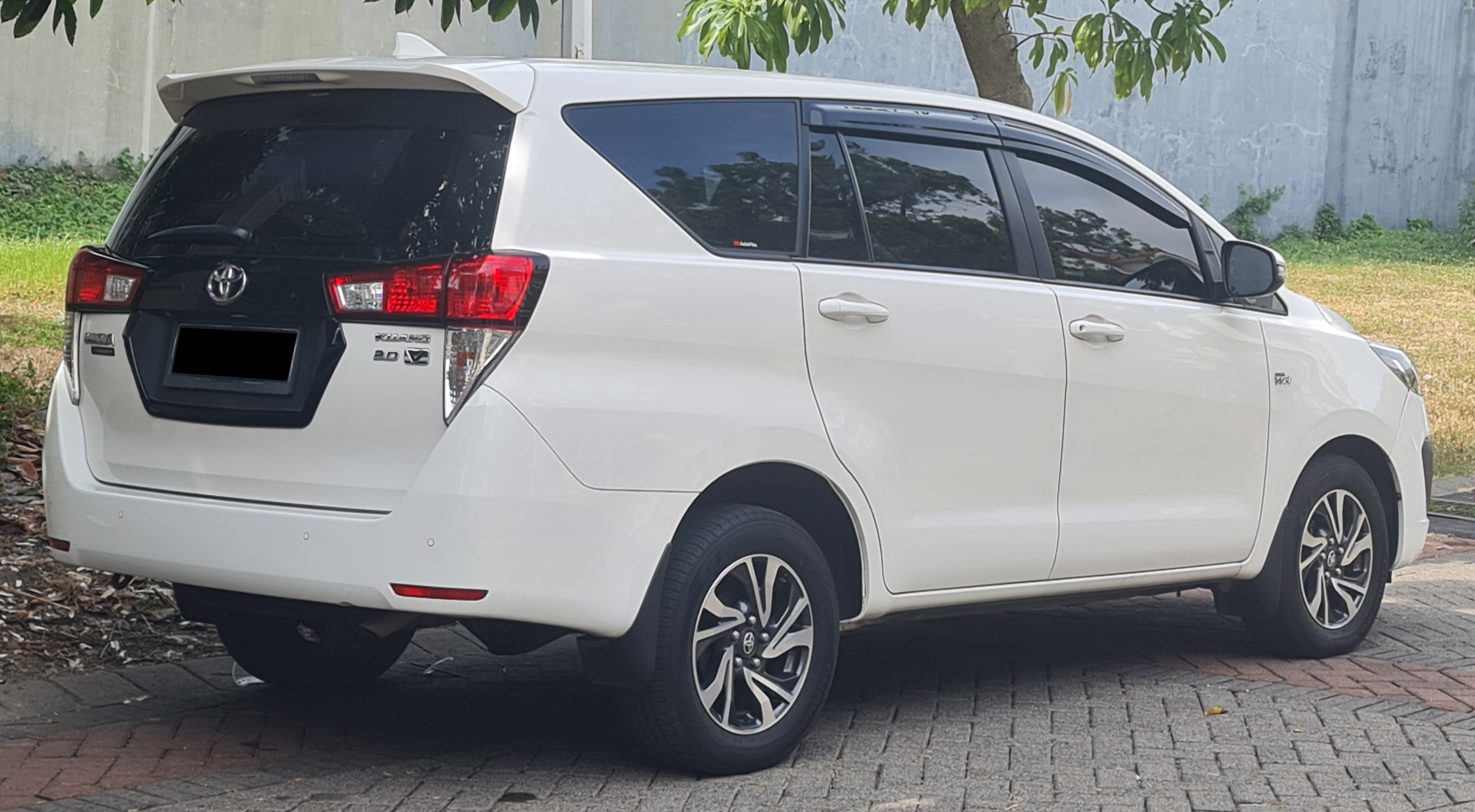
2021 Kijang Innova 2.0 V Luxury (TGN140; facelift, Indonesia)

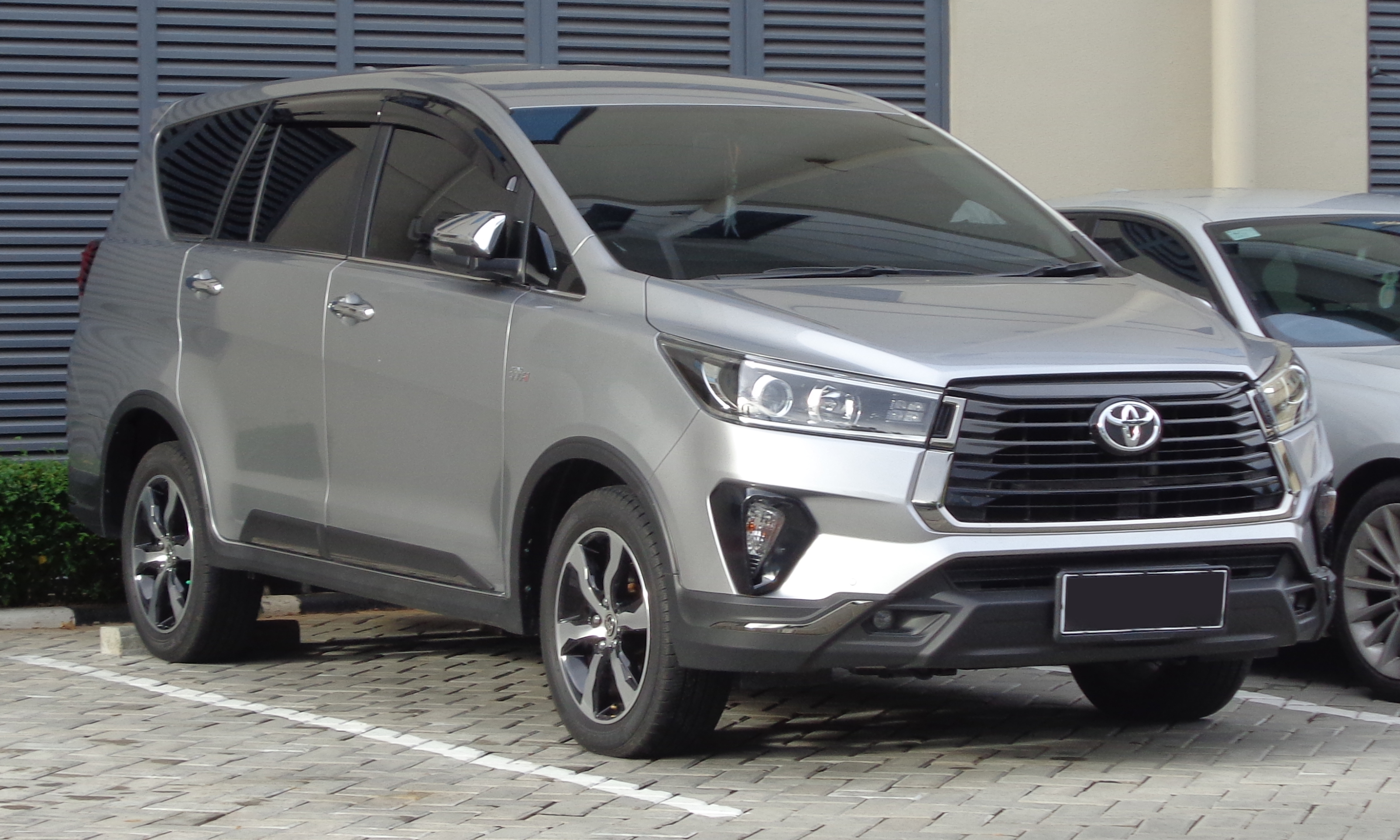
2021 Kijang Innova 2.0 Venturer (TGN140; facelift, Indonesia)

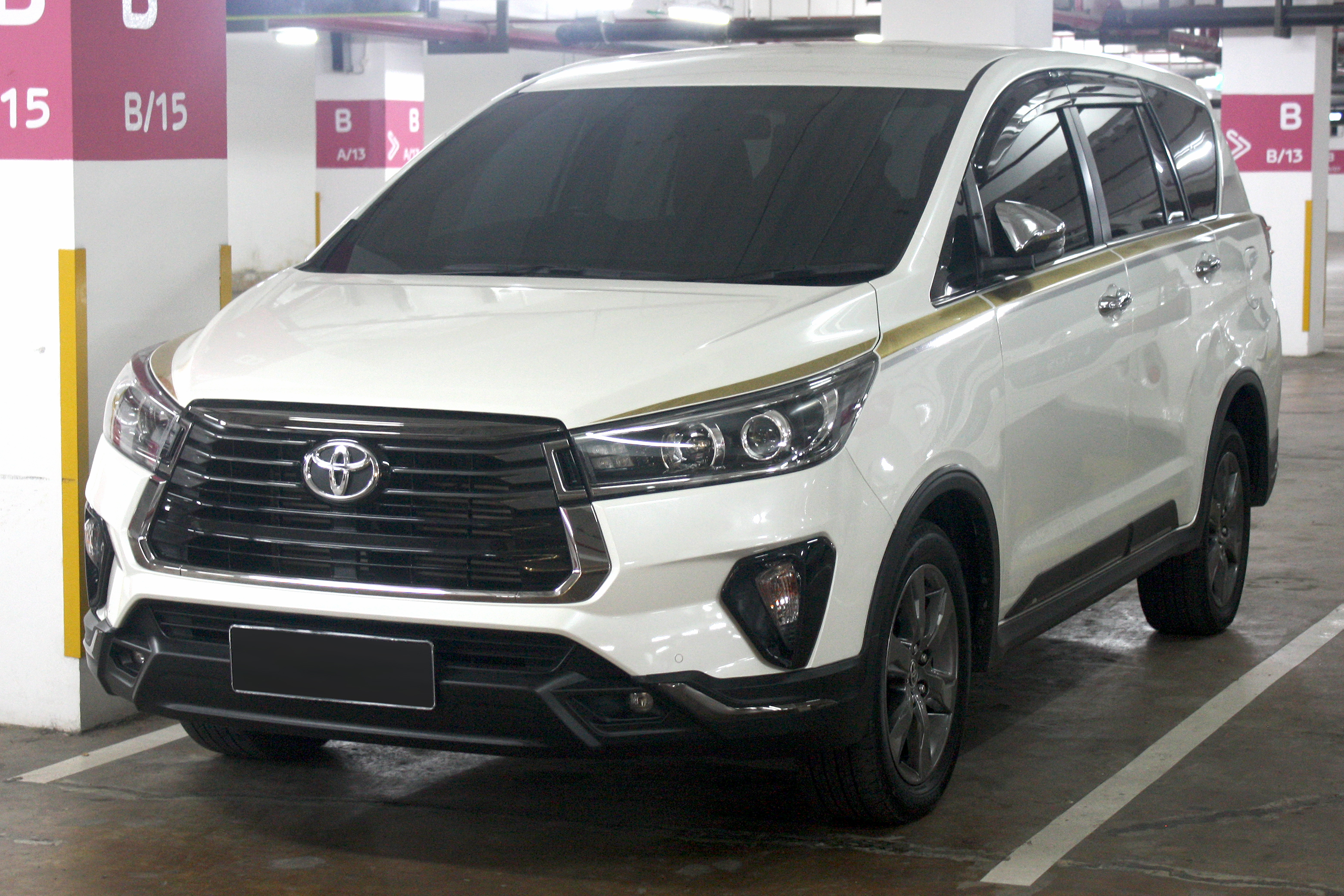
2021 Kijang Innova 2.4 Venturer Limited Edition (GUN142; facelift, Indonesia)

==== Malaysia ====
The second-generation Innova was launched in Malaysia on 5 December 2016. It is assembled by UMW Toyota Motor at its Shah Alam facility. Initial grade levels were the E and G models.

In September 2017, UMW Toyota introduced a flagship variant, called the 2.0 X.

The facelifted Innova was launched in Malaysia on 2 February 2021. Grade levels remained the same as the pre-facelift model.

Although the third-generation Innova has been launched, UMW Toyota Motor continues to sell the second-generation Innova, treating the third-generation model as a separate model called the Innova Zenix. It was later discontinued in 2024 when it was removed from the UMW Toyota Motor website.

==== Philippines ====
The second-generation Innova was launched on 26 February 2016 with four grades as the first-generation; the base J without fog lights and steel wheels with hubcaps; the mid-level E with fog lights and alloy wheels; the middle G with carrying over features as the E trim but with upgraded interiors and chrome-accented liveries; and the high-end V, with captain seats on the middle row, HID projector headlights, and an engine start button. All variants were powered with either 2.8-litre 1GD-FTV turbocharged 4-cylinder diesel engine or 2.0-litre 1TR-FE 4-cylinder petrol engine (except for V trim). Transmission choices were either 5-speed manual (for J, E and G trims) or 6-speed automatic with sequential shift (for E, G and V trims). The second-generation Innova rolled off Toyota Motor Philippines' assembly plant in Santa Rosa, Laguna on 14 April 2016 and went on sale a few days later.

In 2018, the Touring Sport trim was introduced, based on the E trim. It features sportier body kits and black alloy wheels. It is only offered with a 2.8-litre 1GD-FTV turbocharged diesel engine and mated with either 5-speed manual or 6-speed automatic with sequential shift transmissions.

The facelifted version of the Innova came out on 20 February 2021 with the same four grades as the pre-facelift model, while the petrol and Touring Sport models were removed from the lineup. Featuring the reworked of front fascia and new design of alloy wheels for E and G grades.

In November 2023, the XE grade was introduced, based on the J trim but with 6-speed automatic transmission with sequential shift while the manual transmission variant of the E grade was discontinued. It also received an upgraded feature list.

==== Saudi Arabia and UAE ====
Al Futtaim Motors, the distributor of Toyota in the UAE, launched the second-generation Innova on 6 April 2016. The UAE-specification model is powered by the 2.7-litre 2TR-FE engine, paired with a six-speed automatic transmission.

==== Thailand ====
As in India, the second-generation Innova is also marketed in Thailand as the Innova Crysta. Initial grade levels were 2.0 E, 2.8 G diesel and 2.8 V diesel. The units are imported from Indonesia.

In November 2020, the facelift model of the Thai-market Innova was launched. It is available in 2.0 Entry, 2.8 Crysta and 2.8 Crysta Premium grade levels.

==== Vietnam ====
On 18 July 2016, the second-generation Innova was launched in Vietnam, powered solely by a 2.0-litre 1TR-FE petrol engine. It is produced in Vĩnh Phúc and is available in E, G and V grade levels.

In September 2025, the second-generation Innova was discontinued in Vietnam.

=== Powertrain ===
The 2.0-litre and 2.7-litre petrol engines are carried over from the previous model with slight modifications, while the 2.4-litre and 2.8-litre diesel engines are newer additions for this generation. Toyota claimed a 30 percent improvement in fuel efficiency for the diesel engines.

Type	Engine code	Displacement	Power	Torque	Transmission	Model code	Layout	Calendar years
Petrol	1TR-FE	1,998 cc (2.0 L) I4 with Dual VVT-i	102 kW (137 hp; 139 PS) @ 5,600 rpm	183 N⋅m (18.7 kg⋅m; 135 lb⋅ft) @ 4,000 rpm	5-speed R151 manual; 6-speed AC60 automatic	TGN140	RWD	2015–present
Petrol	2TR-FE	2,693 cc (2.7 L) I4 with Dual VVT-i	122 kW (164 hp; 166 PS) @ 5,200 rpm	245 N⋅m (25.0 kg⋅m; 181 lb⋅ft) @ 4,000 rpm	5-speed R151 manual; 6-speed AC60 automatic	TGN141	RWD	2016–present
Diesel	2GD-FTV	2,393 cc (2.4 L) turbocharged I4	109.5–110 kW (147–148 hp; 149–150 PS) @ 3,400 rpm	342–343 N⋅m (34.9–35.0 kg⋅m; 252–253 lb⋅ft) @ 1,200–2,800 rpm	5-speed R151 manual; 6-speed RC60 manual	GUN142	RWD	2015–present
Diesel	2GD-FTV	2,393 cc (2.4 L) turbocharged I4	109.5–110 kW (147–148 hp; 149–150 PS) @ 3,400 rpm	360 N⋅m (36.7 kg⋅m; 266 lb⋅ft) @ 1,200–2,800 rpm	6-speed AC60 automatic	GUN142	RWD	2015–present
Diesel	1GD-FTV	2,755 cc (2.8 L) turbocharged I4	128–130 kW (172–174 hp; 174–177 PS) @ 3,400 rpm	360 N⋅m (36.7 kg⋅m; 266 lb⋅ft) @ 1,200–3,400 rpm	5-speed R151 manual; 6-speed RC60 manual; 6-speed AC60 automatic	GUN143	RWD	2016–present

=== Safety ===
In a 2016 testing under 2012–2016 ASEAN NCAP standards, the second-generation Innova received a 4-star rating for the 3-airbag variant not equipped with electronic stability control, and a 5-star rating for the 5-airbag variant with electronic stability control.

In a 2020 testing, the second-generation Innova received a 5-star rating under 2017–2020 ASEAN NCAP standards, after the model received standard electronic stability control.

ASEAN NCAP test results Toyota Innova (2016)
Test	Points	Stars
Adult occupant:	14.10	4 /5 stars
Child occupant:	76%	4 /5 stars
Safety assist:	NA	

ASEAN NCAP test results Toyota Innova (2016)
Test	Points	Stars
Adult occupant:	14.10	5 /5 stars
Child occupant:	76%	4 /5 stars
Safety assist:	NA	

ASEAN NCAP test results Toyota Innova (2020)
Test	Points
Overall:	5 /5 stars
Adult occupant:	45.90
Child occupant:	21.51
Safety assist:	15.28

=== Kijang Innova EV Concept ===
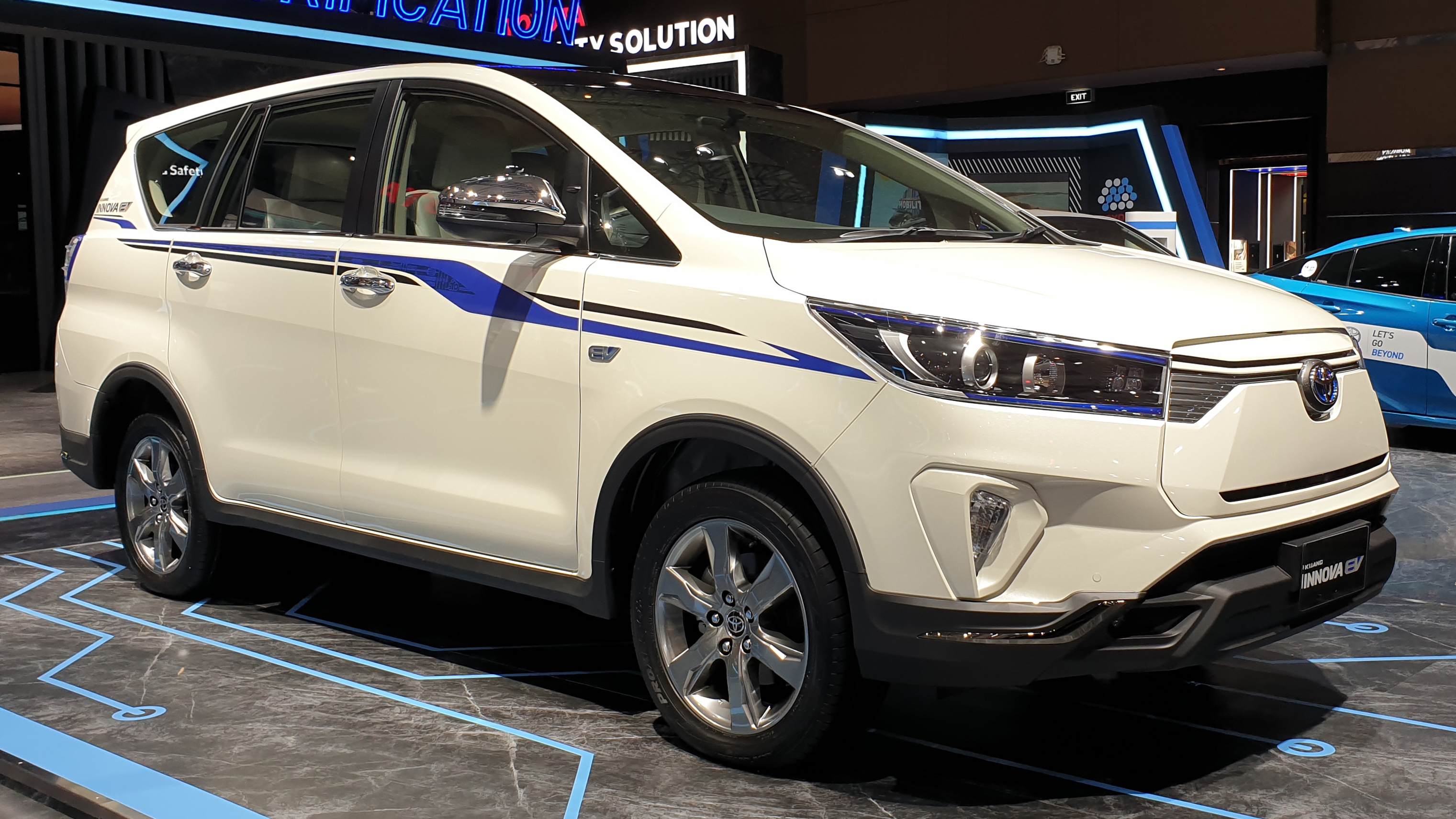
Kijang Innova EV Concept

The Kijang Innova EV Concept is an EV conversion prototype that was first presented on 31 March 2022 in Indonesia. The conversion was done by the Australian branch of SEA Electric, a company specialising in electric truck conversions, based in Melbourne, Australia. Five prototypes were built; three were built in Melbourne and two in Indonesia.

The storage battery uses a 58.9 kWh lithium-ion unit with an estimated range of 280 km (175 miles). The electric motor is rated at 134 kW (180 hp; 182 PS) and could generate up to 700 N⋅m (520 lb⋅ft) of torque. The claimed top speed is 120 km/h (75 mph).

== Third generation (AG10; 2022) ==
Third generation
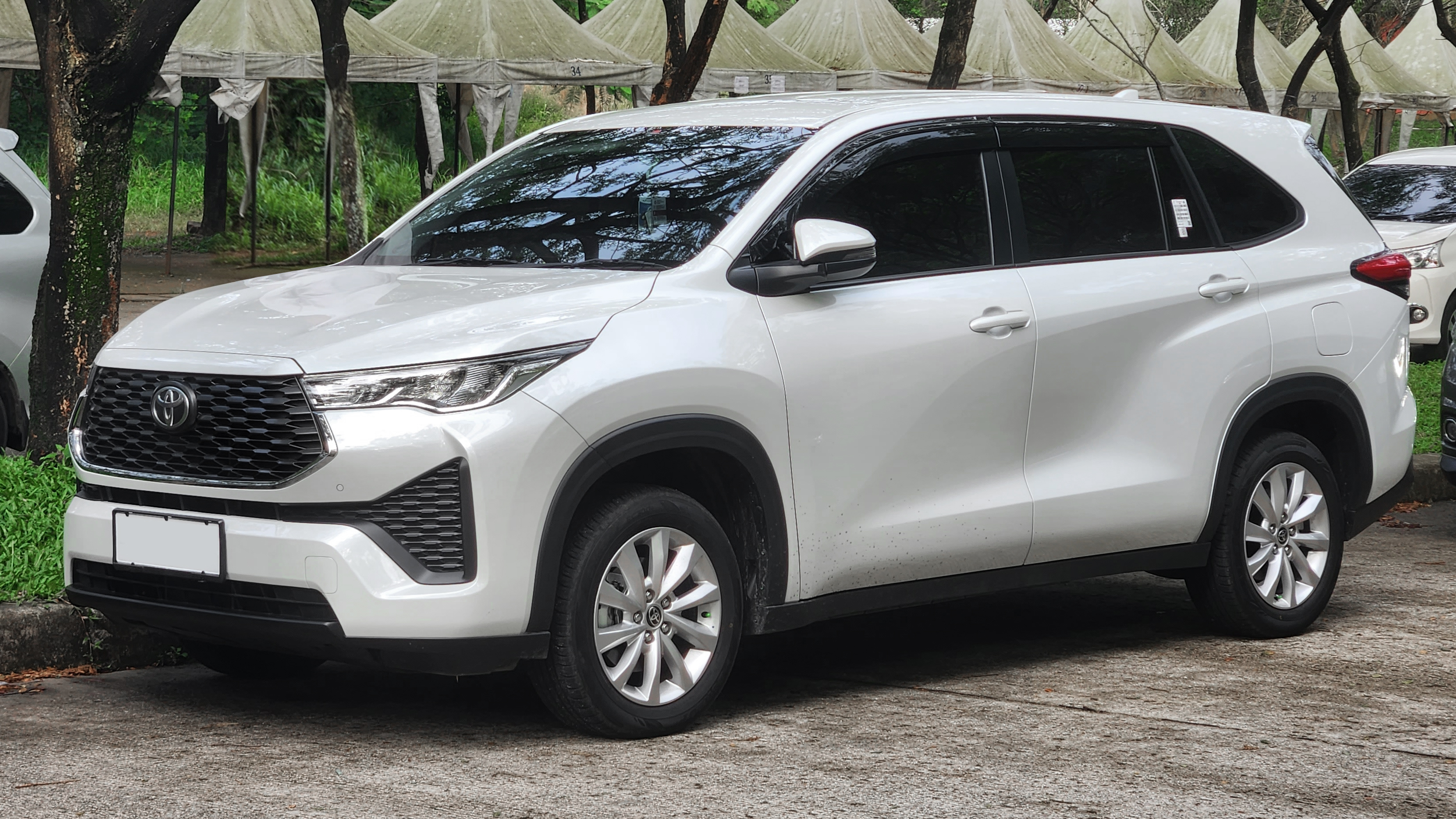
- 2022 Kijang Innova Zenix 2.0 V (MAGA10, Indonesia)

Overview
- Model code: AG10
- Also called: Toyota Kijang Innova Zenix (Indonesia); Toyota Zenix (Philippines); Suzuki Invicto (India)
- Production: November 2022 – present
- Assembly: Indonesia: Karawang (TMMIN); India: Bidadi (TKM)
- Designer: Hirofumi Fukui, Yukiko Yano, Ryosuke Tairadate and Yukihiro Nagata (exterior); Kaori Suzuki (interior)

Body and chassis
- Layout: Front-engine, front-wheel-drive
- Platform: TNGA: GA-C
- Chassis: Unibody
- Related: Toyota Noah/Voxy (R90)

Powertrain
- Engine: Petrol: 2.0 L M20A-FKS I4; Petrol hybrid: 2.0 L M20A-FXS I4
- Electric motor: Permanent magnet synchronous (hybrid)
- Transmission: K120 CVT with physical first gear (petrol); eCVT (hybrid)
- Hybrid drivetrain: Power-split
- Battery: 1.31-kWh (6.5-Ah) NiMH (hybrid); 1.03 kWh Li-ion (HEV)

Dimensions
- Wheelbase: 2,850 mm (112.2 in)
- Length: 4,755 mm (187.2 in)
- Width: 1,845–1,850 mm (72.6–72.8 in)
- Height: 1,785–1,795 mm (70.3–70.7 in)
- Kerb weight: 1,555–1,695 kg (3,428.2–3,736.8 lb)

The third-generation Innova, designated with the codename AG10, was launched in Indonesia on 21 November 2022 as the Kijang Innova Zenix, and in India on 25 November 2022 as the Innova HyCross. It was later rolled out to other Southeast Asian markets, including Malaysia on 21 June 2023, Thailand on 19 July 2023 as the Innova Zenix, the Philippines as the Zenix on 22 June 2023, and Vietnam from October 2023 as the Innova Cross.

Built on the unibody, front-wheel-drive-based GA-C platform, it is powered by two engine options: the 2.0-litre M20A-FKS petrol and the 2.0-litre M20A-FXS petrol hybrid. Manual transmission and diesel engine options are no longer offered for this generation.

Development of the third-generation Innova was led by chief engineer Hideki Mizuma, who is also the chief engineer for the second, third, and fourth-generation Noah/Voxy, as well as the Sienna and Estima/Previa. The industrial design right was attributed to Toyota Auto Body, Toyota's subsidiary that develops and produces minivan models in Japan.

The design concept of the third-generation Innova was described as an "Innovative Multipurpose Crossover". Similar to the second generation, the concept combines the design elements of a crossover SUV with the interior space and practicality of an MPV. Toyota shifted the A-pillars further back, while the D-pillars were tilted forward to avoid an orthodox van-like design. The track width is kept narrow to minimise the turning radius, positively affecting manoeuvrability.

With the use of the flat-floor variation of the GA-C platform shared with the fourth-generation Noah/Voxy, the third-generation Innova is lighter by 170 kg (375 lb) than its predecessor. The wheelbase was also lengthened by 100 mm (3.9 in). Cabin length increased by 56 mm (2.2 in) over the previous generation, to 1,746 mm (68.7 in), while cabin width increased by 46 mm (1.8 in) to 1,488 mm (58.6 in). Headroom was also increased, by 32 mm (1.3 in).

Other additions and changes compared with the previous generation include an electronic parking brake with auto brake hold as standard, a dashboard-mounted gear lever, a panoramic roof, Toyota Safety Sense, and second-row captain seats with "Ottoman" leg rests. The suspension uses a MacPherson strut with coil spring setup at the front and a torsion beam with coil spring setup for the rear.

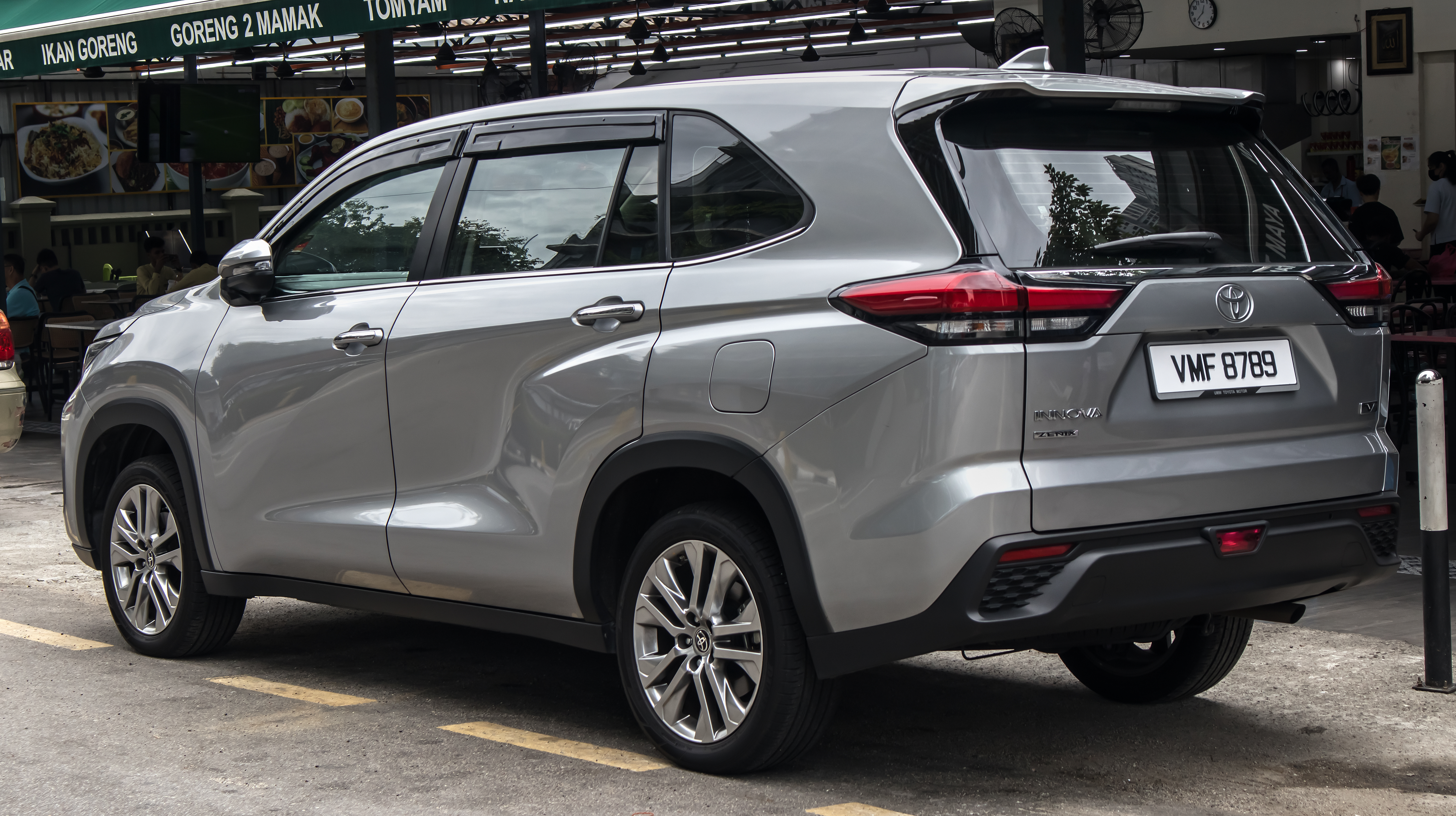
Rear view

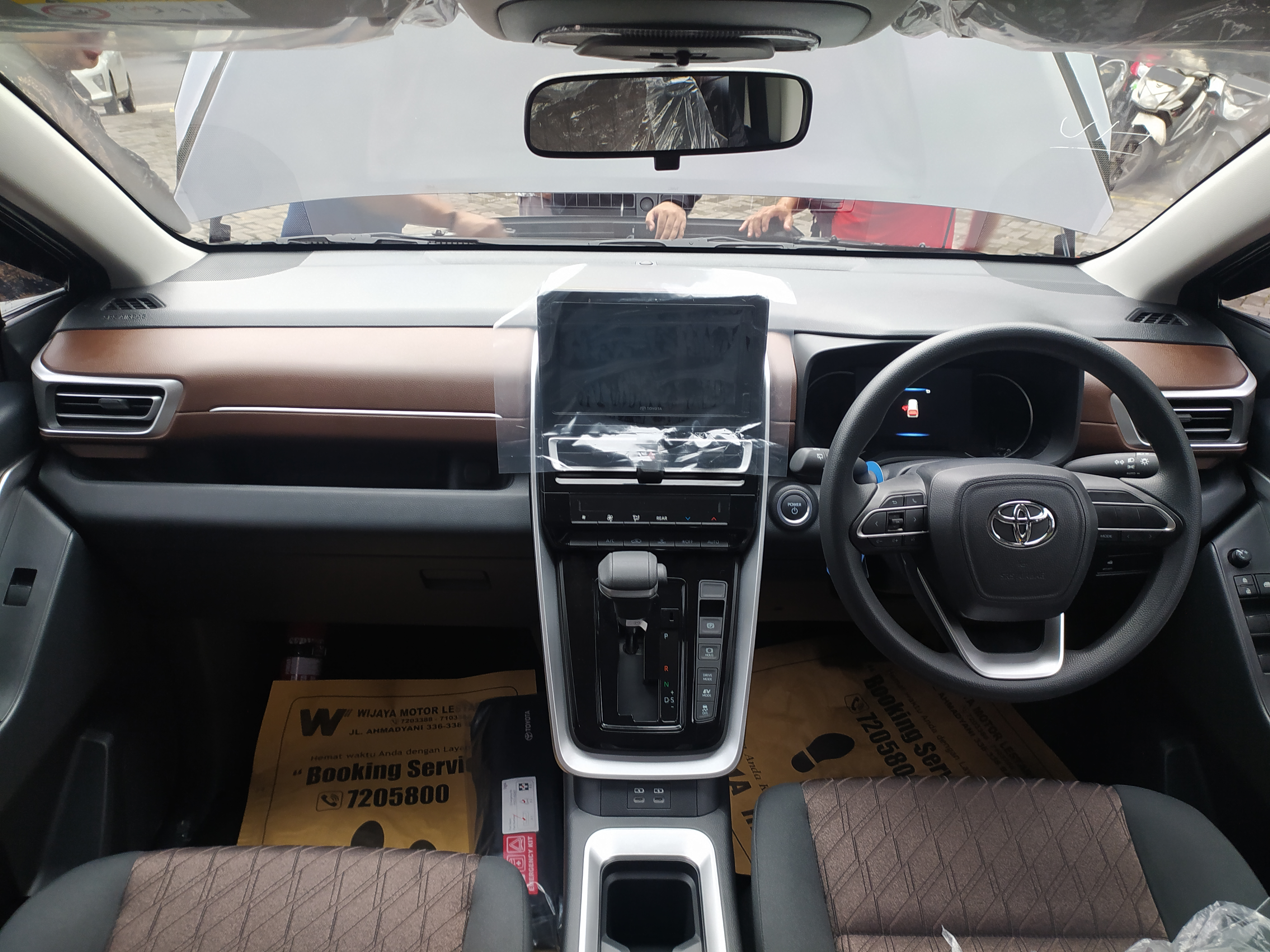
Interior

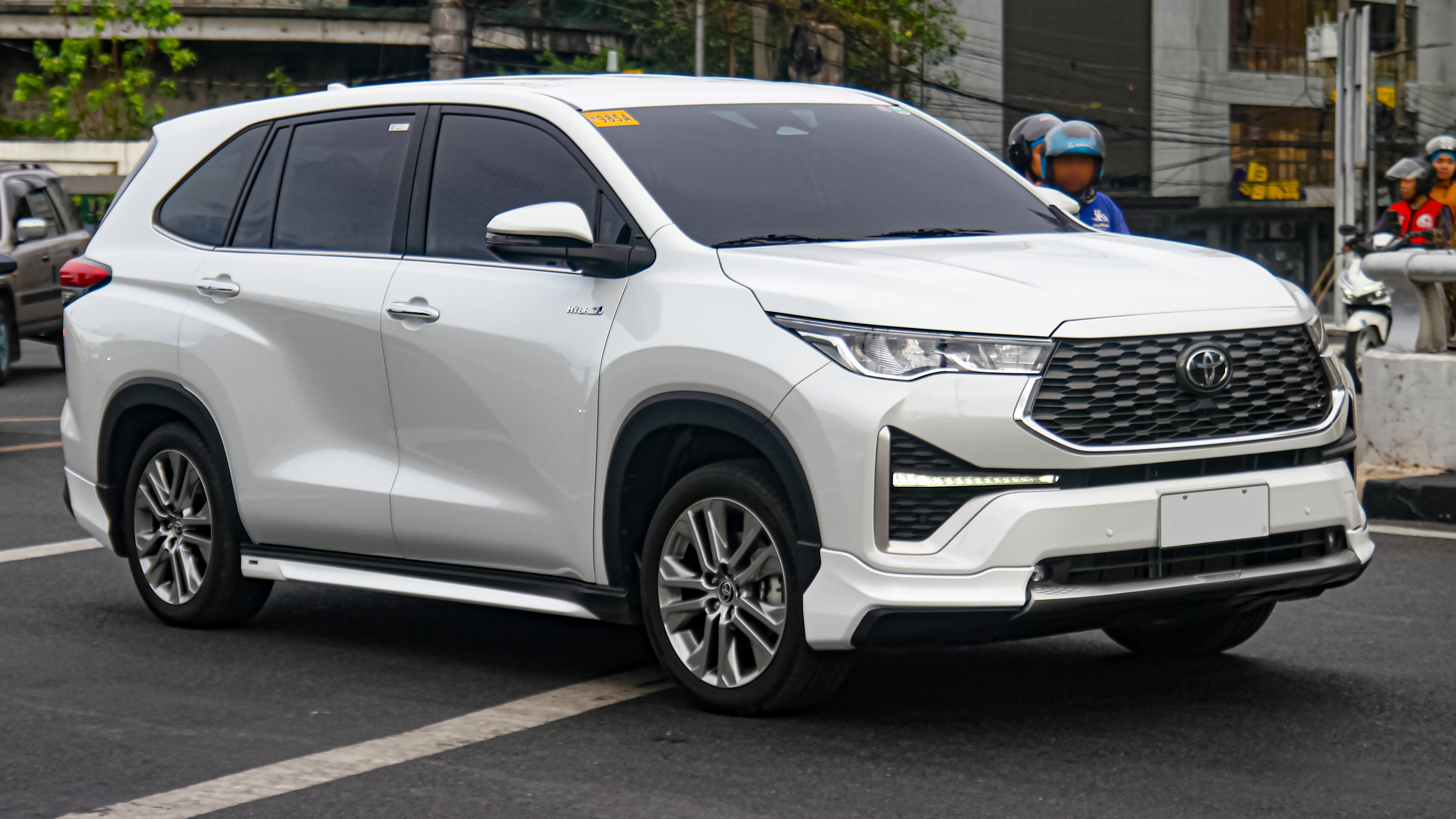
Innova Zenix 2.0 Q Hybrid with optional Modellista package (MAGH10)

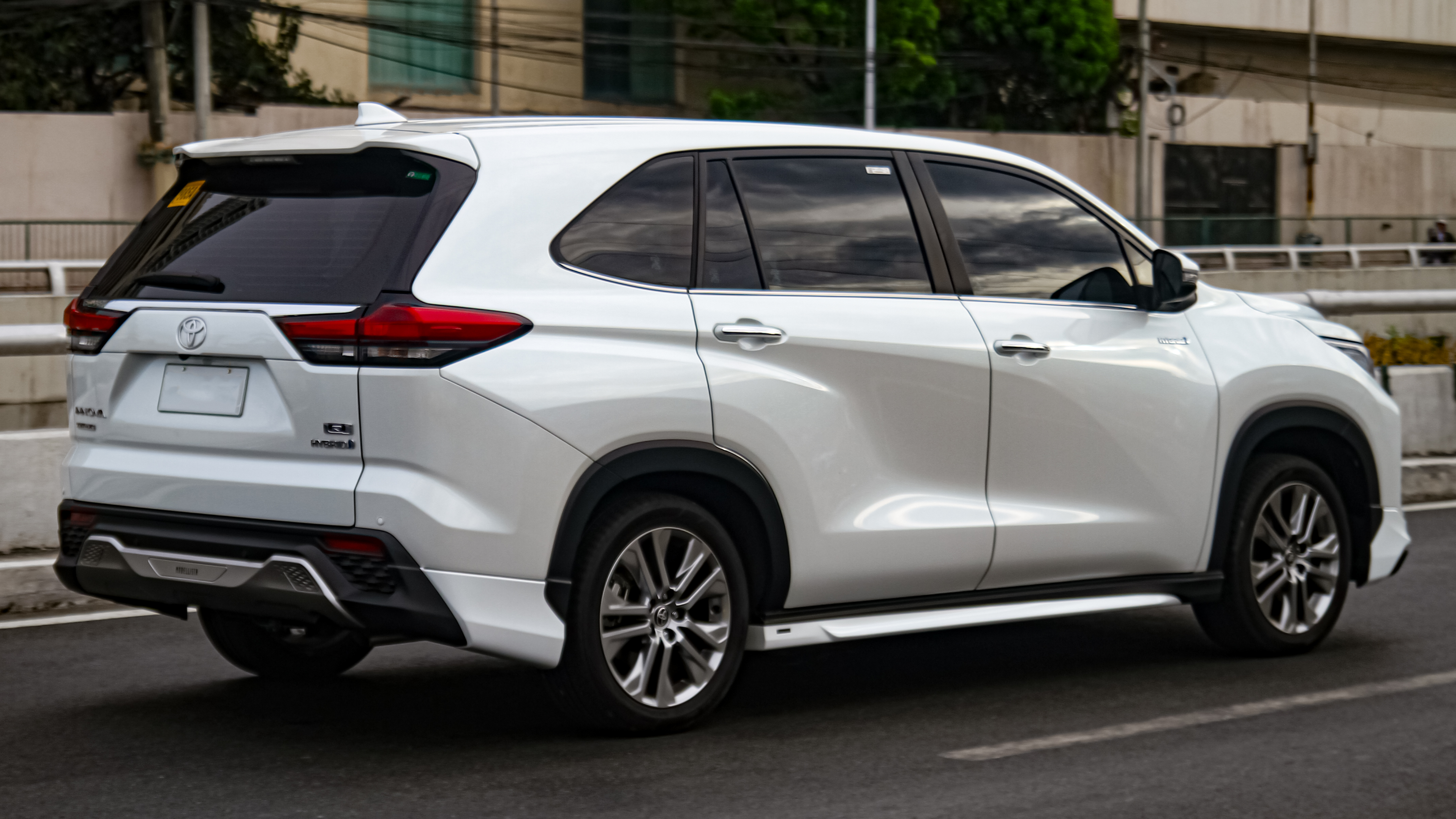
Rear view (Modellista package)

=== Markets ===
==== Asia ====
===== Indonesia =====
For the Indonesian market, the model is marketed as the Kijang Innova Zenix. The name Zenix was derived from the English word "zenith", which Toyota stated as conveying "peak performance", while the letter x represents the word "crossover". The Kijang nameplate is retained due to its popularity in the country, with Toyota in Indonesia designating the model as the seventh-generation Kijang. It is the first hybrid vehicle and the first TNGA-based vehicle to be produced by Toyota in the country.

Three trim levels are offered for the Kijang Innova Zenix: G, V and Q. The hybrid powertrain is optional on G and V trims and standard on the Q trim. Toyota Safety Sense (TSS) is also standard on the latter. The Modellista accessories package is also offered as an option for the V hybrid and Q trims.

The monthly sales target for the Kijang Innova Zenix in the country was set at around 4,000 units, with planned exports to around 50 countries starting February 2023. As of 2022, the petrol model of the Kijang Innova Zenix contains 85 percent of locally sourced parts, while the hybrid version contains 60 percent as many of the electrical components are imported from Japan. While the NiMH battery is locally assembled, the M20A 2.0-litre engines are imported from India.

The Kijang Innova Zenix was updated in October 2026. The hybrid models received a 12.3-inch digital instrument cluster, while petrol models received a 7-inch digital instrument cluster. The Q without Modellista package was discontinued.

===== India =====
In the Indian market, the model is marketed as the Innova HyCross. Initially, it was available in five trim levels: two petrol trims, G-SLF and GX; and three hybrid trims, VX, ZX, and ZX (O). A new trim, the VX (O) with hybrid powertrain, was added in March 2023, bringing the total to six trim levels. Toyota Safety Sense is standard on the highest trim. The entry-level petrol trim (G-SLF) is targeted at fleet owners and taxi operators. It has been available for retail sales since January 2023. A new GX (O) petrol variant was introduced by 15 April 2024.

Two years after its launch, the HyCross crossed the 100,000 sales mark.

===== Brunei =====
Brunei was the first country to receive the third-generation Innova, launched there on 14 April 2023. It is offered in a single trim level (2.0 V), powered solely by a 2.0-litre M20A-FKS petrol engine mated to a CVT.

===== Malaysia =====
The third-generation Innova was launched in Malaysia on 21 June 2023 as the Innova Zenix. It is offered in two trim levels: 2.0 V with the M20A-FKS petrol engine and 2.0 HEV with M20A-FXS hybrid powertrain. Toyota Safety Sense is standard.

===== Philippines =====
The third-generation Innova was launched in the Philippines on 22 June 2023 as the Toyota Zenix. In marketing materials, the Innova nameplate was dropped to avoid confusion with the second-generation, diesel-powered Innova, which remained on sale and was locally assembled at the Sta. Rosa plant. However, the Zenix retains the physical "Innova" emblem. It is offered in two trim levels: 2.0 V CVT with the M20A-FKS petrol engine and 2.0 Q HEV CVT with M20A-FXS hybrid powertrain. Toyota Safety Sense is standard on the latter.

===== Thailand =====
The third-generation Innova was launched in Thailand on 19 July 2023 as the Innova Zenix. It is offered in two trim levels, Smart and Premium, both powered exclusively by a 2.0-litre M20A-FXS hybrid powertrain. Toyota Safety Sense is standard.

===== Vietnam =====
The third-generation Innova was launched in Vietnam on 12 October 2023 as the Innova Cross. Bookings began in July 2023. It is offered in two variants: 2.0 V with the M20A-FKS petrol engine and 2.0 HEV with M20A-FXS hybrid powertrain. Toyota Safety Sense is standard on the latter. In December 2025, the 2.0 G variant with the M20A-FKS petrol engine was added to the line-up.

===== GCC =====
The third-generation Innova was launched in the GCC markets on 10 July 2023. Each market has offered its own specifications, as follows:

Variants	Engine code	Bahrain	Kuwait	Qatar	Saudi Arabia	UAE
Petrol	M20A-FKS	GL	Standard	INB	GL	-
Petrol hybrid	M20A-FXS	GLE	-	INHB; INHM	GL HEV; VIP7 HEV	Hybrid; HyCross 7S; HyCross 8S

==== Latin America ====
===== Guatemala =====
The third-generation Innova was launched in Guatemala on 17 June 2023. It is offered in two trim levels: AF-24 with the M20A-FKS petrol engine and BN-24 with M20A-FXS hybrid powertrain. Toyota Safety Sense is standard on the latter.

===== Panama =====
The third-generation Innova was launched in Panama on 26 June 2023. It is offered in a single trim level, powered solely by a 2.0-litre M20A-FKS petrol engine mated to a CVT.

=== Suzuki Invicto ===
Maruti Suzuki launched the Suzuki Invicto in India on 5 July 2023, a rebadged and restyled version of the Innova HyCross. It is available in two trim levels, Zeta+ and Alpha+, both offered exclusively with the 2.0-litre M20A-FXS hybrid powertrain.

=== Powertrain ===
For this generation, the Innova is equipped with a hybrid powertrain as an option. It is a fifth-generation hybrid system developed by Toyota, combining the M20A-FXS engine with a permanent magnet synchronous electric motor and a 6.5-Ah nickel-metal hydride (NiMH) battery. Positioned under the front seats, the NiMH battery was chosen over lithium-ion for its better durability in hot-weather conditions.

Type	Engine code	Displ.	Power	Torque	Combined system output	Electric motor	Battery	Transmission	Model code	Layout	Cal. years
Petrol	M20A-FKS	1,986 cc (2.0 L) I4	128 kW (172 hp; 174 PS) @ 6,600 rpm	205 N⋅m (20.9 kg⋅m; 151 lb⋅ft) @ 4,500–4,900 rpm	-	-	-	K120 Direct Shift CVT	MAGA10	FWD	2022–present
Petrol hybrid	M20A-FXS	1,986 cc (2.0 L) I4	Engine: 112–116 kW (150–156 hp; 152–158 PS) @ 6,000 rpm Motor: 83 kW (111 hp; 113 PS)	Engine: 187 N⋅m (19.1 kg⋅m; 138 lb⋅ft) @ 4,400–5,200 rpm Motor: 206 N⋅m (21.0 kg⋅m; 152 lb⋅ft)	137–147.5 kW (184–198 hp; 186–201 PS)	Permanent magnet synchronous	1.31-kWh (6.5 Ah) NiMH; 1.03 kWh Li-ion (2026–)	eCVT	MAGH10	FWD	2022–present

=== Awards ===
In Indonesia, the third-generation Innova won the Car of the Year Otomotif Award 2023, Car of The Year GridOto Award 2023, Forwot Cars of The Year 2023, and Best Carvaganza Editors Choice Award (CEC) 2023.

=== Safety ===
Bharat NCAP test results Toyota Innova Hycross (2025, based on Latin NCAP 2016)
Test	Score	Stars
Adult occupant protection	30.47/32.00	5 /5 stars
Child occupant protection	45.00/49.00	5 /5 stars

Bharat NCAP test results Maruti Suzuki Invicto (2025, based on Latin NCAP 2016)
Test	Score	Stars
Adult occupant protection	30.43/32.00	5 /5 stars
Child occupant protection	45.00/49.00	5 /5 stars

== Sales ==
In 2023, the Innova became Indonesia's best-selling car for the first time in 18 years.

Year	Indonesia		India	Philippines	Vietnam	Thailand	Malaysia (Note: Figures based on registration (Malaysia))
Year	Innova	Innova Zenix	India	Philippines	Vietnam	Thailand	Malaysia
2004^{†}	63,710	—					
2005	82,954	—	31,936	12,130			8,905
2006	38,992	—	40,184	10,767	9,934		9,436
2007	40,169	—	46,527	10,544	12,433		5,805
2008	51,189	—	43,947		14,947		5,401
2009	35,980	—	42,003	8,654	8,475		4,967
2010	53,824	—	51,304		7,419		5,581
2011	54,763	—	51,930		6,005		4,768
2012	71,685	—	75,911		4,233		5,675
2013	64,539	—	58,266		6,011		5,122
2014	56,157	—	59,450				4,797
2015	43,444	—	60,526				3,610
2016	57,493	—	71,875	18,137	11,344	610	2,485
2017	61,775	—	72,349	24,434	12,001	1,845	5,504
2018	59,630	—	78,130	18,175	14,618	1,174	4,703
2019	52,981	—	61,743	20,794	12,211		3,007
2020	27,594	—	34,078	10,551	5,423		1,576
2021	49,745	—	55,250	13,304	3,002		1,554
2022	40,924	6,009	56,569	17,810	3,272		1,232
2023	22,724	43,737	84,073	18,357 (Note: Figures includes both the Innova and the latest Zenix models)	1,909	1,107	2,867
2024	26,380	37,296		17,648	6,759	2,274	2,869
2025	30,508	30,656					1,636

† Including the outgoing Kijang (Note: Figures based on registration)

== See also ==
- List of Toyota vehicles
