= Fastron-Metro TV Europe Asia Expedition =

Fastron-Metro TV Europe Asia Expedition is an Indonesian expedition team who travel around the world by surface using 4x4 vehicles. The trip across the 15 countries started from Indonesia to Venice Italy. The five-month journey traces the Silk Road trade route that crosses the continent of Asia to Europe.

== Team members ==
- Bucek (Leader)
- Dr. Bastaman (Expedition and Wilderness Medical Expert Consultant - Medicadventurer™)
- Hendri Ismaoen (Producer/reporter Metro TV)
- Yeremia Leo (Cameraman Metro TV)
- Meckry Raditya (Expedition driver)
- Ibnu Hajar (Expedition driver)
- Anastasia Rijkers (Producer/PR Metro TV)
- Irvan Liberty (Reporter Media Indonesia)
- Basuki Widiasto (Editor/IT support and communication Metro TV)
- Dr. Andrianto (Expedition Doctor - Medicadventurer™ Indonesia)
- Ibnu Purwanto (Technical crew)
- Crack Palinggi (Photographer)
- Agus Siswanto (Expedition driver)
- Yana Mulyana (Logistic manager)

== Countries crossed by the team ==
From Indonesia they crossed 15 countries:

- Malaysia
- Thailand
- Laos
- China
- Kirgiztan
- Kazakhstan
- Uzbekistan
- Turkmenistan
- Iran
- Turkey
- Bulgaria
- Serbia
- Hungary
- Austria
- Italy

== Episode 1 ==
In the first episode the team start the trip from Indonesia to Malaysia. Preparing the vehicle is shown, then sending the vehicle by sea, until the team remove the vehicle from the port of Port Klang Malaysia.

== Episode 2 ==
The team go to Melaka, which is a place located in the coastal area of Malaysia where there are buildings or Portuguese, Dutch, and English heritage.

After Melaka, the four-car team continue the journey to Penang. Before reaching Penang, Tim takes time to stop at Bukit Jugra, a place known for paragliding sport. The team try flying from the hills here.

== Episode 3 ==
They enter Thailand which is hit by massive flooding and see how the Thai people fight against the disaster.

== Episode 4 ==
After Malaysia and Thailand, the team travel to the former French colony of Laos.

The team go to Batuxay Park and see buildings that resemble temples, one is Wat Si Saket Museum. Wat Si Saket Temple was built in 1819-1824 during the reign of King Anouvong, the last ruler Tiane Vien.

The team then continued on to Luang Prabang.

== Episode 5 ==
After three days journey from the border, the team arrived at the People's Republic of China. The team stopped at the city of Chengdu, an industrial city in China. Although Chengdu is an industrial city, many historic buildings are well maintained.

== Episode 6 ==
The expedition continues into China and spends 19 days there. After passing through the borders of Kyrgyzstan, the expedition continues to Kazakhstan, Uzbekistan, Iran, and Turkey.

After traveling over 27,000 kilometers, the team arrives in Italy, the goal of the expedition.

== Vehicle ==
The team used four 4x4 Toyota Fortuner vehicles.
