= Toyota KD engine =

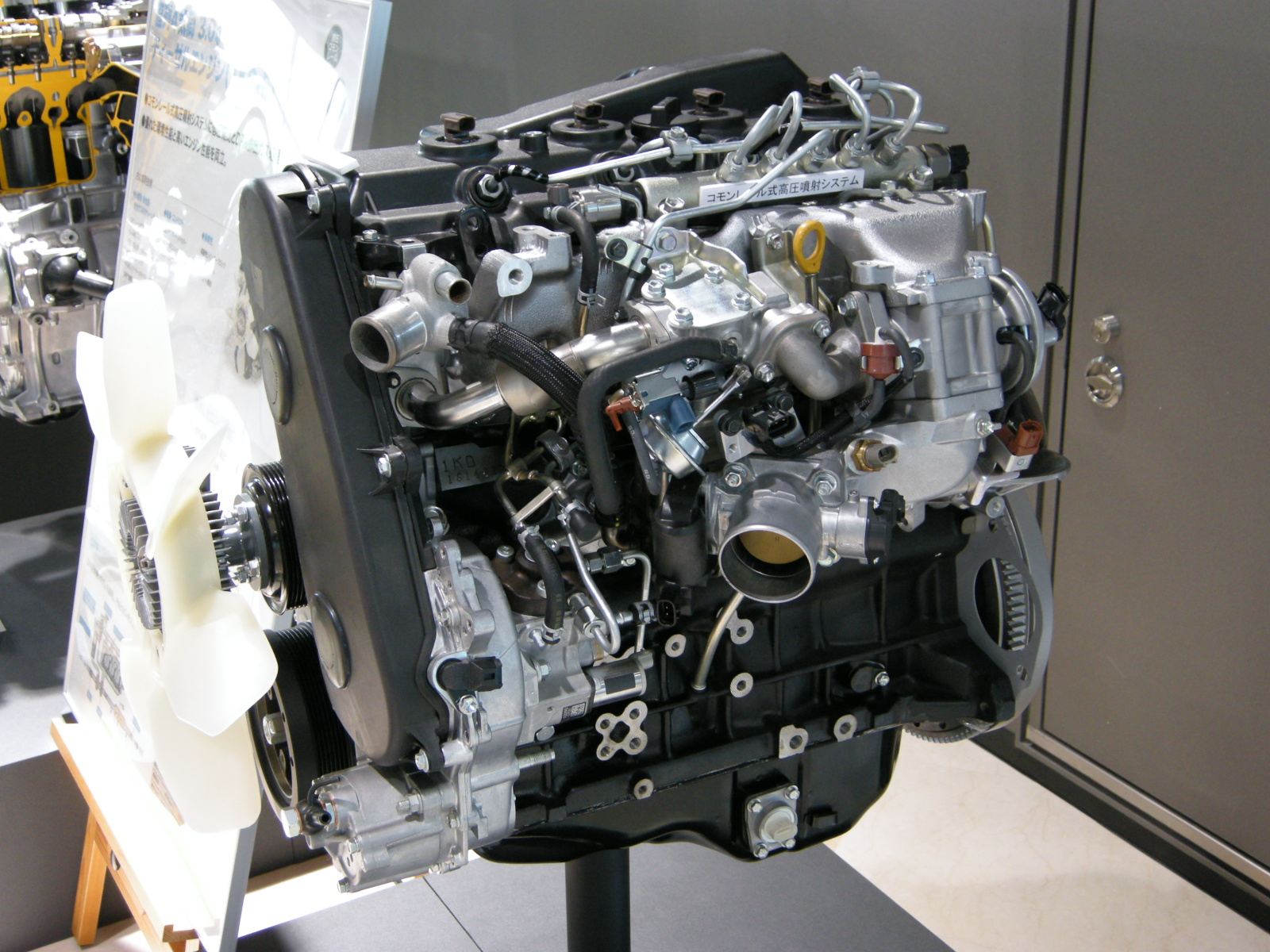

Overview
- Manufacturer: Toyota Motor Corporation
- Production: 2000–present

Layout
- Configuration: Straight-4
- Displacement: 2.5–3.0 L (2,494–2,982 cc)
- Valvetrain: DOHC 4 valves x cyl.
- Compression ratio: 17.4:1-18.5:1

Combustion
- Fuel system: Common rail Direct injection
- Fuel type: Diesel
- Cooling system: Water-cooled

Output
- Power output: 80–140 kW (107–188 hp; 109–190 PS)
- Torque output: 222–410 N⋅m (164–302 lb⋅ft)

Chronology
- Predecessor: Toyota KZ engine Toyota L engine
- Successor: Toyota GD engine

The Toyota KD engine series is a diesel engine produced by Toyota. The KD engine series is a modernization and successor to the Toyota KZ engine series.

== 1KD-FTV ==
First appearing in August 2000, the 1KD-FTV was the first iteration of this generation and was first used in the J90 Toyota Land Cruiser Prado in July 2000.

The 1KD-FTV is a 3.0 L (2,982 cc) straight-four common rail D-4D (Direct injection four-stroke common-rail Diesel) diesel engine with a variable nozzle turbocharger (VNT) and intercooler. It has 16 valves and a double overhead camshaft (DOHC) design. Bore and stroke is 96 mm × 103 mm (3.78 in × 4.06 in). It generates 127 kW (170 hp; 173 PS) at 3400 rpm, and 343–410 N⋅m (253–302 lb⋅ft; 35–42 kg⋅m) of torque at 1800–3400 rpm depending on target market and emission specifications. In some markets, outputs are 127 kW (170 hp; 173 PS)/280 N⋅m (207 lb⋅ft; 29 kg⋅m), 140 kW (188 hp; 190 PS)/280 N⋅m (207 lb⋅ft; 29 kg⋅m), and 100 kW (134 hp; 136 PS)/300 N⋅m (221 lb⋅ft; 31 kg⋅m) for the Indonesian market Toyota Hiace. Redline of this engine is at 4200 rpm. Compression ratio is 17.9:1.

This engine uses Toyota's D-4D Common Rail fuel injection technology operating at ultra-high pressures of up to 1,350 bar (19,600 psi) which is about 8 times more than the pressure of conventional fuel injection systems within a "common rail" that feeds the injectors on all four cylinders. This is combined with a 32-bit ECU which controls fuel quantity, valve timing, and boost pressure at different engine parameters resulting in best fuel economy and also full utilization of power during acceleration. Pilot injection is also utilized by the common rail fuel system to smooth engine operation. Small amounts of fuel are introduced into the combustion chamber prior to the main injection event, reducing lag time and promoting more continuous and complete combustion. Exterior and interior engine noise is also reduced.

The 1KD engine produces 17% more power with 11% less fuel consumption than its predecessor, the 1KZ engine.

This engine was first used in Toyota Land Cruiser Prado, third-generation Hilux Surf, fifth-generation HiAce and then in the Toyota Fortuner, Toyota Dyna, Toyota Toyoace, Hino Dutro, and Toyota Hilux.

== 2KD-FTV ==
Appearing in November 2001, the 2KD-FTV is the 2nd generation of the KD series of engine with a smaller 2.5 L (2,494 cc) displacement and went on sale in the UK market in the 2002 Toyota HiAce producing either 66 kW (88 bhp) at 3,800rpm and 192 N⋅m (142 lb⋅ft; 20 kg⋅m) at 1,200–3,000rpm or 76 kW (102 bhp) at 3600rpm and 260 N⋅m (192 lb⋅ft; 27 kg⋅m) 1,600–2,400 rpm.

The displacement of this engine is based on the previous 2L engine. The bore remained the same at 92 mm (3.62 in) but the stroke was increased to 93.8 mm (3.69 in). It has 16 valves and is a DOHC engine with a turbocharger and intercooler.

It produces 75 kW (101 hp; 102 PS) at 3400 rpm and 26.5 kg⋅m (260 N⋅m; 192 lbf⋅ft) of torque at 1600–2400 rpm with 4 speed Automatic ECT transmission without intercooler and 200 N⋅m (148 lb⋅ft; 20 kg⋅m) of torque at 1600–3600 rpm with manual transmission without intercooler and 88 kW (118 hp; 120 PS) at 3400 rpm and 325 N⋅m (240 lb⋅ft; 33 kg⋅m) of torque at 1600–3600 rpm for the intercooled version. Toyota Thailand & Japanese, has updated the turbo become variable nozzle turbocharger (VNT) with additional intercooler. This increased the horsepower to 107 kW (143 hp; 145 PS) at 3400 rpm and torque to 343 N⋅m (253 lb⋅ft; 35 kg⋅m) at 1600–2800 rpm.

The compression ratio is 18.5:1. The Redline of this engine is 4400 RPM. This engine also uses D-4D Common Rail (Common rail direct fuel injection) technology. The manufacturer's default injection timing is 6.5 deg before TDC. The only major changes from the 1KD-FTV to the 2KD-FTV were the bore and the stroke.

In 2005, Denso Corporation introduced the 3rd generation of Common Rail System (CRS) on the next 2KD-FTV engine (2005). This fuel system provides ultra-high injection pressure up to 200 MPa (29,000 psi) in order to promote the clean diesel engine. In this engine, the compression ratio was reduced to 17.4:1 with high pressure and multiple diesel injections. The multiple injections consist of pilot injection and the main injection, in order to shorten the ignition delay, reduce the noise, and NO_{x} emission.

The pilot injection timing is 5-6 deg before TDC (dependent on the correction factor by the ECU) while the main injection timing is on the TDC. However, the pilot injection is repealed as the engine speed reaches 2200 rpm and above at low load conditions. This generation of 2KD-FTV engine produces 88 kW (118 hp; 120 PS) at 3600 rpm and the maximum torque is 325 N⋅m (240 lb⋅ft; 33 kg⋅m) at 2000 rpm.

This engine is used in the Toyota Hilux, Toyota Fortuner, Toyota Dyna, Hino Dutro, Toyota Innova and Toyota Hiace. In some Central and South American countries, Toyota also offered this engine on the 2003–2006 4Runner in limited quantities.

== See also ==
- List of Toyota engines
