= Toyota KZ engine =

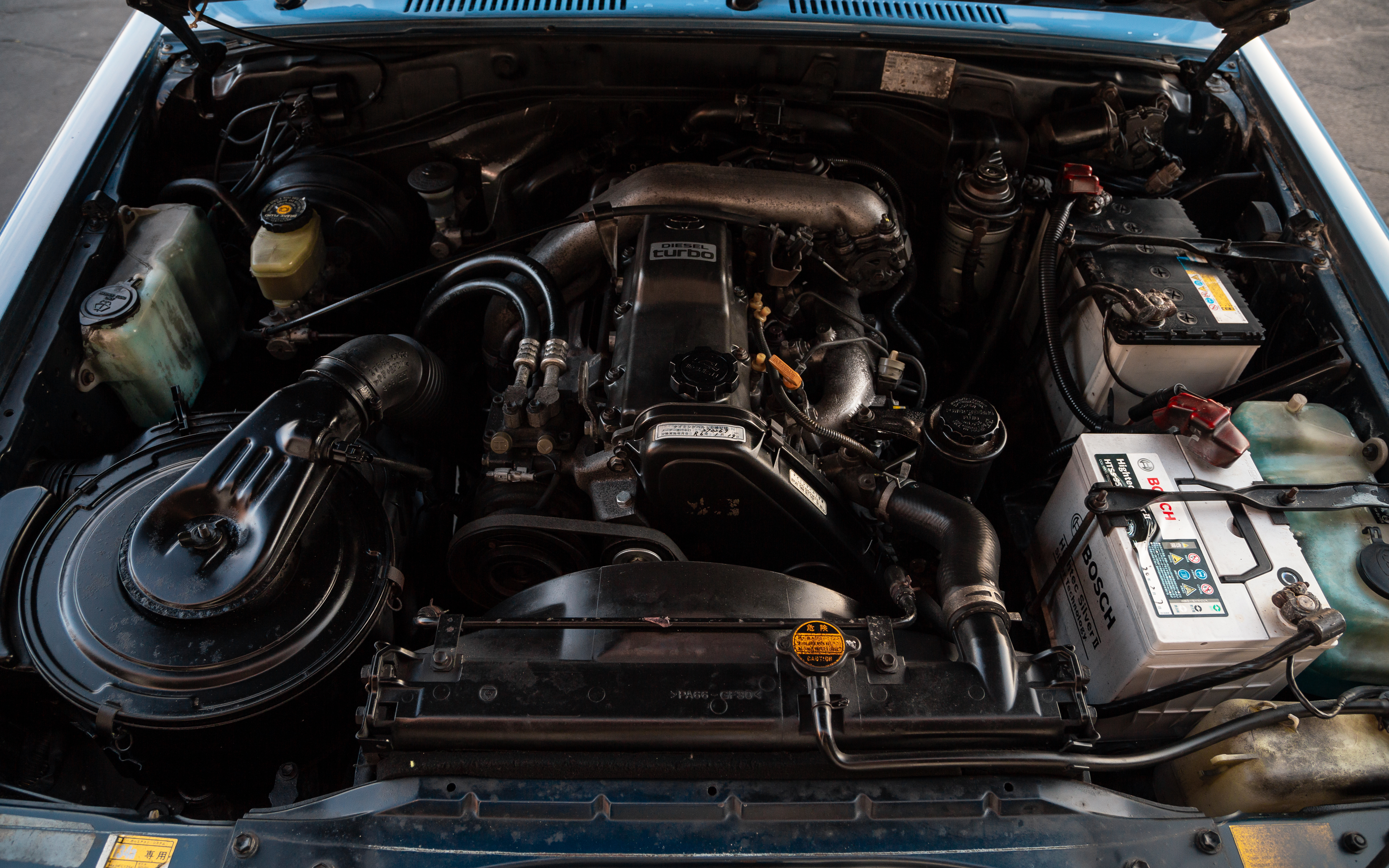
- 1KZ-TE engine in a Toyota Land Cruiser Prado

Overview
- Manufacturer: Toyota

Layout
- Configuration: Inline-4
- Displacement: 3.0 L (2,982 cc)
- Cylinder bore: 96 mm (3.78 in)
- Piston stroke: 103 mm (4.06 in)
- Valvetrain: SOHC, 2 valves per cylinder
- Compression ratio: 21.2:1

RPM range
- Max. engine speed: 4400 rpm

Combustion
- Turbocharger: Standard
- Fuel system: Indirect injection
- Fuel type: Diesel
- Cooling system: Water-cooled

Output
- Power output: 125–145 hp (93–108 kW; 127–147 PS)
- Torque output: 287–343 N⋅m (212–253 lb⋅ft)

Chronology
- Successor: 1KD-FTV

The Toyota KZ engines are diesel engines produced by Toyota.

== 1KZ-T ==
The 1KZ-T is a version of the KZ series engine that used a fully mechanical injector pump. It is a 3.0 L (2,982 cc), 4 cylinders, SOHC, 2 valves per cylinder turbo diesel engine. The compression ratio is 21.2:1. The maximum output is 123 hp (92 kW; 125 PS) at 3600 rpm and the maximum torque is 296 N⋅m (218 lb⋅ft) at 2000 rpm.

Applications:

- 4Runner KZN130L
- Hilux
- Land Cruiser KZJ77, KZJ73

== 1KZ-TE ==
The 1KZ-TE is a 3.0 L (2,982 cc), 4 cylinder, SOHC, 2 valves per cylinder turbo diesel engine with indirect injection. The bore and the stroke are 96 mm × 103 mm (3.78 in × 4.06 in), with a compression ratio of 21.2:1. Maximum output is 128 hp (95 kW; 130 PS) at 3600 rpm with a maximum torque of 287 N⋅m (212 lb⋅ft)⋅m (212⋅ft) at 2000 rpm. The redline is 4400 rpm. Introduced as the replacement of the 2.4 2L-TE engine in Toyota's Light Duty Commercial Vehicles in Japan, it was first included in the 70-series Prado in May of 1993 followed by the Hiace and Hilux Surf in August of the same year. The 1KZ-TE also adopts the electronically controlled fuel injection, ETCS-i (Electronic throttle control System - intelligent) technology which is similar in basic construction to a modern gasoline injector, although using considerably higher injection pressures, it is an indirect injection engine which gives it a significant efficiency and fuel consumption penalty. It was replaced in most markets with the 1KD-FTV engine which uses common rail direct injection.

Used in KZN130 (Japan market), KZJ71W, KZJ78W, KZN160 and KZN165R (Australian & South African delivered model).

The intercooler equipped version of the engine increases the output of the engine 138 hp (103 kW; 140 PS) [Aust. 130 hp (97 kW; 132 PS)] at 3600 rpm and a maximum torque of 343 N⋅m (253 lb⋅ft) at 2000 rpm.

Applications:

- Land Cruiser Prado KZJ90, KZJ95, KZJ120L, KZJ120R
- Land Cruiser Prado KZJ71W, KZJ73W, KZJ78W.
- Hilux Surf KZN130, KZN185
- Hilux KZN165
- Toyota HiAce KZH100, KZH200
- Granvia
- Toyota Land Cruiser (J70)
