= Toyota Fortuner =

Mid-size SUV series produced by Toyota

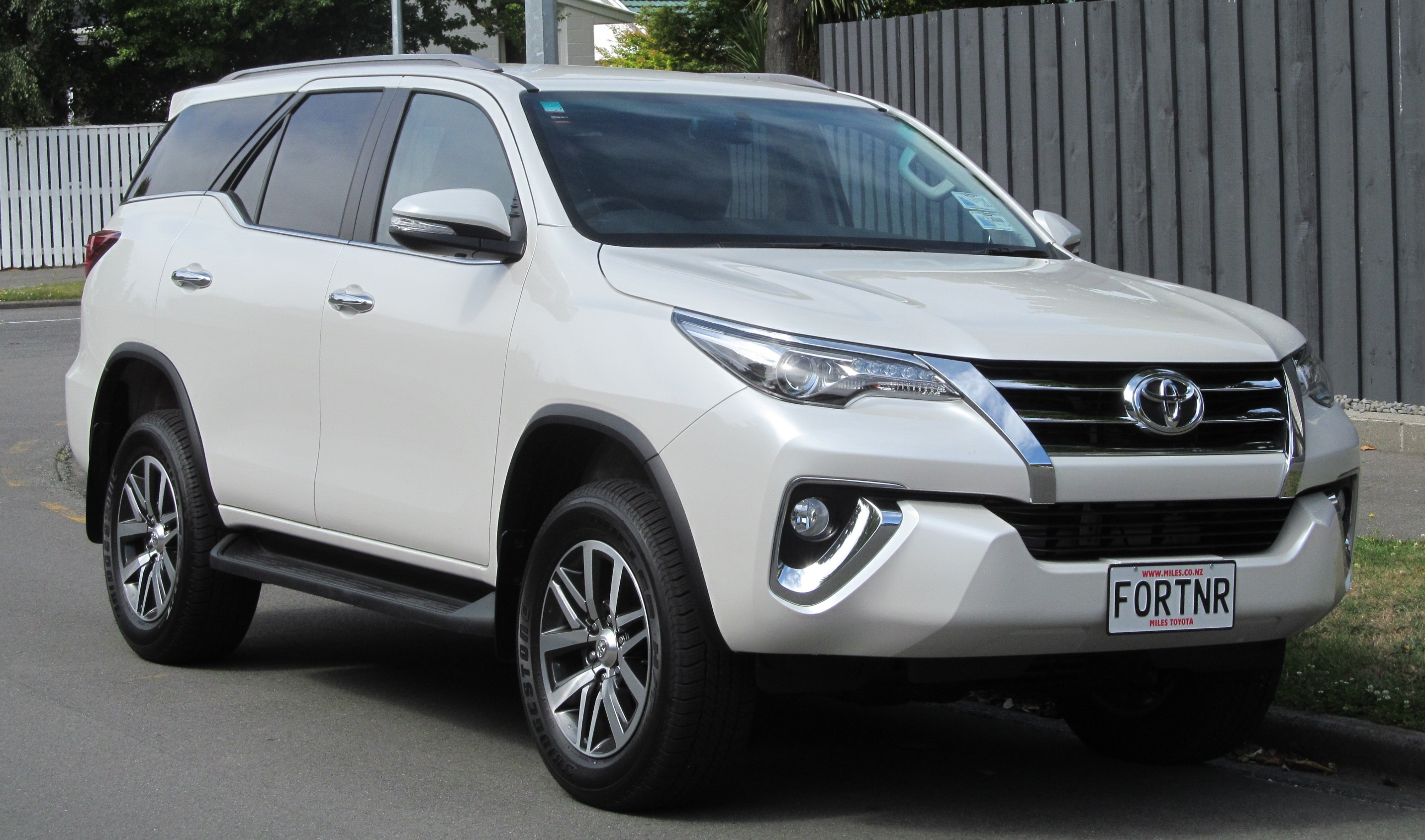
- 2015 Toyota Fortuner Limited (GUN156, New Zealand)

Overview
- Manufacturer: Toyota
- Also called: Toyota Hilux SW4 (2004–2015); Toyota SW4
- Production: November 2004 – present
- Model years: 2005–present

Body and chassis
- Class: Mid-size SUV
- Body style: 5-door SUV
- Layout: Front-engine, rear-wheel-drive; Front-engine, four-wheel-drive
- Platform: Toyota IMV platform
- Chassis: Body-on-frame
- Related: Toyota Hilux; Toyota Innova

Chronology
- Predecessor: Toyota 4Runner; Toyota Hilux Sport Rider (Thailand)

The Toyota Fortuner, also known as the Toyota SW4, is a mid-size SUV manufactured by the Japanese automaker Toyota since 2004.

Built on the Hilux pickup truck platform, it features two/three rows of seats and is available in either rear-wheel drive or four-wheel drive configuration. It is a part of Toyota's IMV project for emerging markets, which also includes the Hilux and the Innova.

The name Fortuner is derived from the English word fortune.

== Production ==
While the first-generation Fortuner was developed in Thailand by Thai and Japanese engineers, its facelifted version, as well as the Hilux and Innova, was designed in Australia by Toyota Australia, which is also responsible for developing the second-generation model.

For the medium body-on-frame SUV segment, Toyota offers the Hilux Surf / 4Runner (Japan/North America) and the Land Cruiser Prado (Europe and Australasia). However, in some Central and South American countries, Australia and, New Zealand, Toyota offers the Fortuner alongside the 4Runner and/or Prado, like in Peru, Panama, Ecuador, Colombia, El Salvador, Guatemala and Nicaragua.

Specialised variants with a naturally-aspirated 5L-E diesel engine is offered to governments, organisations and the UN alongside other utility vehicles such as the Prado, Hilux, HiAce, and the 70 and 200 series Land Cruisers.

== First generation (AN50/AN60; 2004) ==
First generation
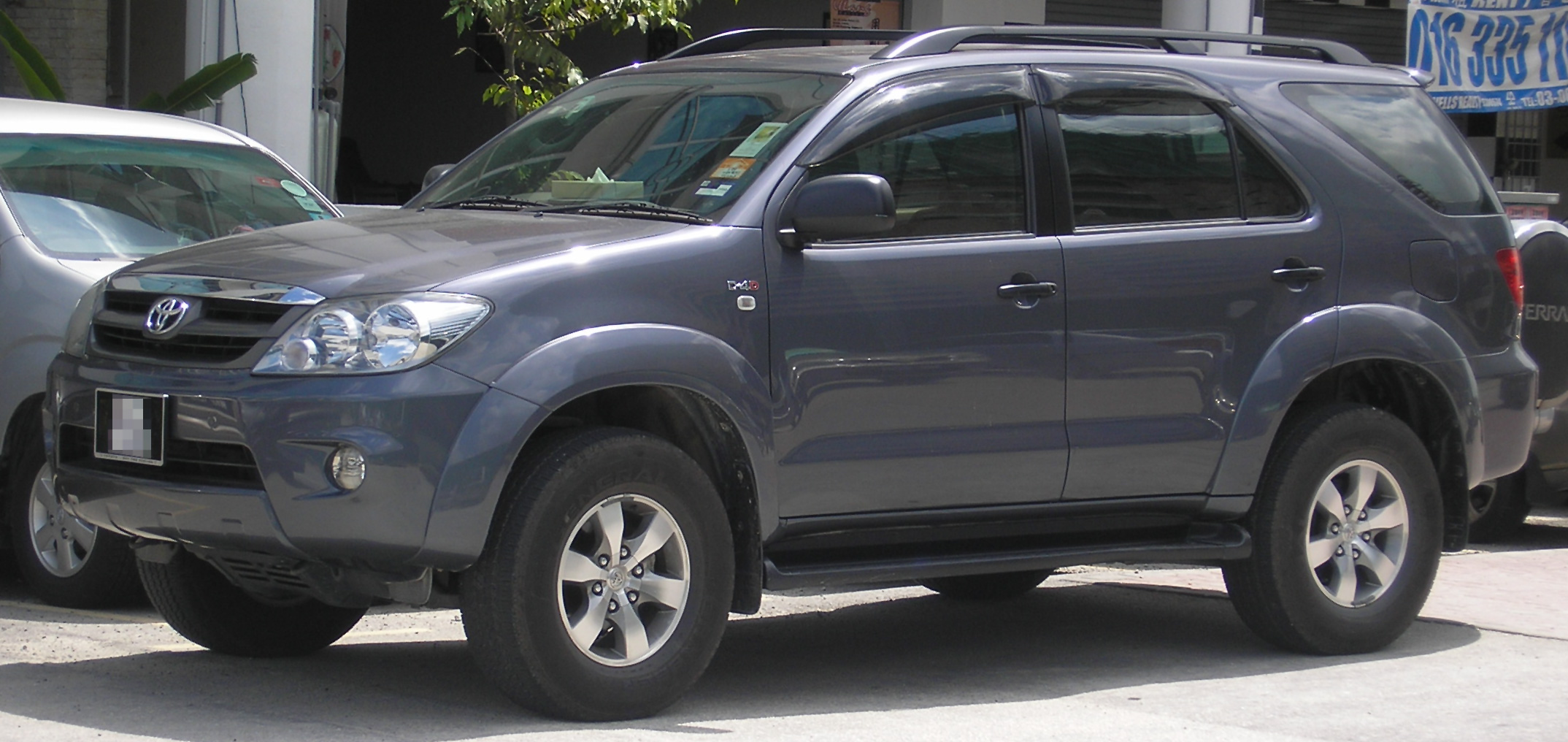
- Fortuner 2.5 G (KUN60; pre-facelift, Malaysia)

Overview
- Model code: AN50 (4WD models); AN60 (2WD models)
- Also called: Toyota Hilux SW4; Toyota SW4
- Production: November 2004 – December 2015
- Assembly: Argentina: Zárate (TASA); Egypt: Cairo (AAV: from 2012); India: Bidadi (TKM); Indonesia: Karawang, West Java (TMMIN); Kazakhstan: Kostanay (from June 2014); Malaysia: Shah Alam (UMW); Thailand: Ban Pho; Samrong Tai (TMT); Venezuela: Cumaná; Vietnam: Vĩnh Phúc; Pakistan: Karachi (IMC)
- Designer: Satoshi Yokoi, Hideo Morita and Hiroyuki Kawagishi; Satoshi Yokoi, Shigetoshi Kouzai and Naoto Furukado (2008 facelift)

Body and chassis
- Related: Toyota Hilux (AN10/AN20/AN30); Toyota Innova (AN40)

Powertrain
- Engine: Petrol: 2.7 L 2TR-FE I4 (TGN51/61); 4.0 L 1GR-FE V6 (GGN50/60); Petrol flex-fuel: 2.7 L 2TR-FBE I4 (TGN51/61); Diesel: 2.5 L 2KD-FTV D-4D turbo I4 (KUN50/60); 3.0 L 5L-E I4 (LAN50); 3.0 L 1KD-FTV D-4D turbo I4 (KUN51/61)
- Transmission: 5-speed manual; 4-speed automatic; 5-speed automatic

Dimensions
- Wheelbase: 2,750 mm (108.3 in)
- Length: 4,705 mm (185.2 in)
- Width: 1,840 mm (72.4 in)
- Height: 1,850 mm (72.8 in)
- Curb weight: 1,710–1,980 kg (3,770–4,365 lb)

The first generation Fortuner was unveiled in December 2004 at the Thailand International Motor Expo and was available for sale in early 2005. It is positioned below the Land Cruiser Prado and above the RAV4.

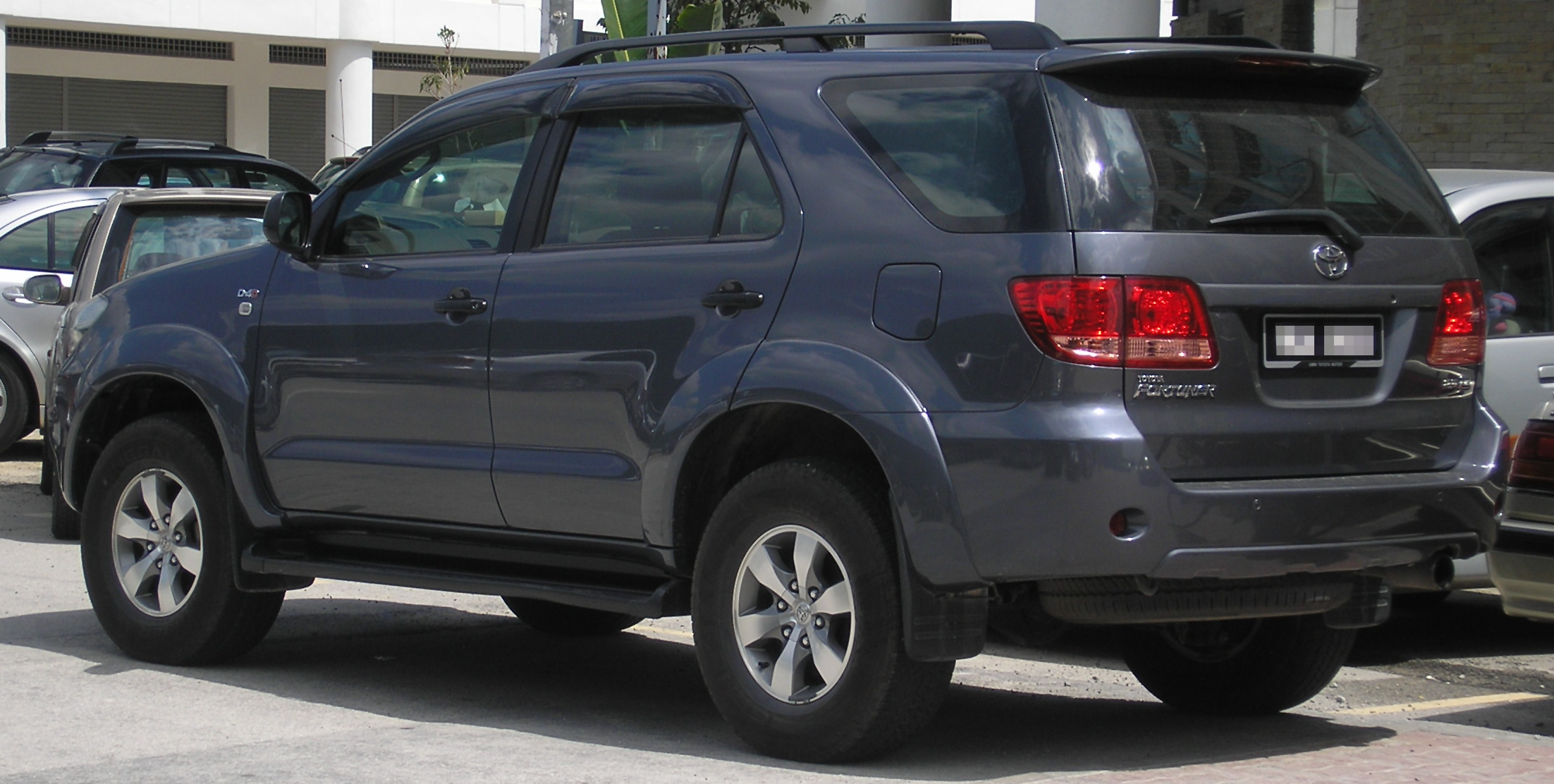
Rear view (pre-facelift, Malaysia)

At first, the Fortuner was sold with 4 different types of 2 petrol engines and 2 diesel engines. All variants were offered in 4×2 (RWD) or 4×4 configuration, with 5-speed manual transmission and a 4 or 5-speed automatic transmission. In August 2012, the 2.5-litre common-rail turbodiesel 2KD-FTV engine was upgraded to a variable nozzle turbocharger (VNT) which was already equipped in the 3.0-litre common-rail turbo diesel 1KD-FTV since its introduction in 2005 to increase power and torque about 60%, also reducing fuel consumption up to 30%.

With this VNT equipment, the Fortuner could now accelerate from 0–100 km/h (0–62 mph) in about 11 seconds (less than 10 seconds for 3.0-litre engine). It was launched to commemorate Pertamina's successful expedition from Jakarta, Indonesia to Rome, Italy (a distance of roughly 20,000 km; 12,000 miles) using a group of Fortuners.

=== Variants ===
A number of engine options are available depending on the country of sale, including a 2.7-litre 2TR-FE and 4.0-litre 1GR-FE V6 petrol with Variable Valve Timing and 2.5-litre 2KD-FTV and 3.0-litre 1KD-FTV common rail variable geometry turbocharger diesel models.

Grade levels are G and G Luxury for rear-wheel drive diesel and petrol, and V for 4×4 Diesel and petrol. The common rail turbo intercooled diesel has a functional scoop on its hood.

In 2007, Toyota Thailand dropped the 4×4 petrol model and replaced it with a two-wheel drive petrol version.

=== Markets ===
==== Argentina ====
In Argentina, it is assembled in Zárate and sold as the Toyota SW4 in petrol and diesel versions. It is the only D-segment SUV made in Argentina.

As of 2020, the Argentine version has over 40% locally and 60% regionally made parts.

==== Brazil ====
Like in Argentina, it is known as the SW4 in Brazil and sold since 2006. In this market, there were 3 engine options offered: 3.0-litre 1KD-FTV diesel, 4.0-litre 1GR-FE V6 petrol and 2.7-litre 2TR-FE flex fuel (petrol and ethanol).

==== Brunei ====
Launched in 2005, the Fortuner in Brunei is available in 2.5-litre manual G grade and 3.0-litre automatic V grade. The 2.5 G was available in 4×2 while the 3.0 V had full-time 4×4.

==== Colombia ====
The Fortuner was unveiled in Colombia in 2005 and launched in 2007 as a replacement for the locally assembled Prado that had been under production for 9 years without any changes. The Prado continued in production until 2009. A new grade was added in 2010, the Fortuner Urbana, with a petrol 2.7 L engine in 4×4 and 4×2 models.

The Fortuner is available in the following grade levels:

- Fortuner Urbana 4×2, with a 2.7-litre engine.
- Fortuner Urbana 4×4 with a 2.7-litre engine.
- Fortuner Plus Diesel, with a 3.0-litre turbo engine.

All of them come standard with a 5-speed manual transmission or an optional 4-speed automatic transmission.

==== Ecuador ====
The Fortuner was unveiled in South America – Ecuador in 2005 and launched in 2007. Versions of the Fortuner have come from Venezuela and Thailand. There are various grade levels available, originally only 4×4 and 4×2 options using a V6 4.0-litre petrol engine were sold. Since 2010, a 2.7-litre engine option was introduced. New facelift models were also introduced. All grades come standard with a 5-speed manual transmission or an optional 4-speed automatic transmission.

==== Egypt ====
The Fortuner was unveiled in Egypt in 2010 and launched in 2011. It is available in two grades with two petrol engines: the 4-litre V6 1GR-FE, and the 2.7-litre inline-four 2TR-FE. All have automatic transmission and 4×4. Starting from April 2012, the car was assembled in Egypt at Arab American Vehicles.

==== India ====
Toyota launched the Fortuner in India in 2009. It is assembled at the Bidadi, Karnataka plant of Toyota Kirloskar Motor from imported CKD kits. Fortuner production increased to more than 950 vehicles per month from the initial 500 units per month.

Originally, there was only one grade model sold, which was the 3.0-litre 1KD-FTV engine 4×4 model, with leather upholstery, manual transmission and climatronic as standard. At the 2012 Indian Auto Expo, Toyota launched the 3.0-litre 4×2 option in both manual and automatic transmission. The top-of-the-range Fortuner 3.0 4×4 AT was introduced to the Indian market in January 2015 along with a 2.5-litre 2KD-FTV engine with 5-speed manual and 5-speed automatic transmission. This 2.5-litre variant was only available in 4×2 configuration.

==== Indonesia ====
The Fortuner was introduced on 8 July 2005 at the 13th Gaikindo Auto Expo in Jakarta. Initially, the Fortuner was imported from Thailand and sold in 2.7 G (4×2) and 2.7 V (4×4) grade levels. The rear wheel drive 2.7 G was offered in the base grade with fabric interior and the Luxury with leather interior and premium sound system. The 3.0-litre diesel engine option is not sold in Indonesia, due to the heavier tax regulations imposed on vehicles with diesel engines larger than 2.5-litre.

The 2.5 G model was later added to the market in 2007, powered by a 2.5-litre diesel engine rated at 75 kW (102 PS; 101 hp). It is mated to a 5-speed manual transmission. Since then, the Fortuner is assembled locally at the Karawang plant to fulfill the local market and exports to the Middle East (GCC) market.

In mid-2009, with the first facelift, a newer variant was added to the lineup, which is the 2.5 G with a 4-speed automatic transmission. The 2.5 G grade can be ordered with "TRD Sportivo" body kits, which is also available as dealer installed options for other models. In August 2012, with the second facelift, the 2.5-litre common-rail turbodiesel 2KD-FTV engine was upgraded with a variable nozzle turbocharger (VNT), rating the engine power output to 106 kW (144 PS; 142 hp). A "VNTurbo" emblem was also applied to the rear. The 2.5 G 4×4 grade with automatic transmission was released in August 2014.

==== Kazakhstan ====
In June 2014, Toyota announced that complete knock-down (CKD) production of the Fortuner at a production facility of Saryarka AvtoProm LLP (SAP). Plans call for a production of approximately 3,000 units annually and the hiring of an additional 100 employees in SAP.

==== Malaysia ====
The Toyota Fortuner was launched in Malaysia in August 2005 with two grade models: the 2.5 G and the 2.7 V.

In August 2008, the first facelift for the Toyota Fortuner was made available in Malaysia with four grade models: 2.5 G, 2.5 G TRD Sportivo, 2.7 V and 2.7 V TRD Sportivo.

In October 2011, the second facelift for the Toyota Fortuner was made available in Malaysia again with four grade models: 2.5 G, 2.5 G TRD Sportivo, 2.7 V and 2.7 V TRD Sportivo.

In October 2013, the Fortuner underwent a minor update. Changes included different colour for the wheels and black upholstery. Grade levels remained the same as the previous model. ISOFIX became standard across the range.

In February 2015, another minor update occurred. Changes included smoked head and tail lamps, bumper-mounted LED DRLs, different TRD Sportivo decals.

The 2.7 V and 2.7 V TRD Sportivo carried a 2.7-litre petrol engine. It was available only in 4-speed automatic transmission with ECT. The 2.5 G and 2.5 G TRD Sportivo had a 2.5-litre diesel engine. At the outset, available with a 5-speed manual transmission only, but for the 2009 model year facelift it was replaced by a 4-speed automatic. In August 2012, together with the Hilux, the engine received a variable nozzle intercooled turbocharger.

==== Pakistan ====
The Fortuner was launched in Pakistan in 2009 but later started to be locally manufactured in February 2013. Initially offered in two variants, Fortuner 2.7 VVT-i and TRD Sportivo, all with the 2.7-litre 2TR-FE engine.

==== Philippines ====
The Fortuner was introduced in 2005. It fills in the gap between the smaller RAV4, and the more premium Land Cruiser Prado. It was sold in two grade levels: the entry-level G, and the top-spec V.

The G models had three drivetrain options available; the 2.7-litre 2TR-FE petrol engine with VVT-i, or the 2.5-litre 2KD-FTV engine with common rail diesel (D-4D) that either came with a 4-speed automatic transmission, or a 5-speed manual. As for the V models, engine options were limited to diesel engines with automatic transmissions only with a choice of the 2.5-litre 2KD-FTV or the 3.0-litre 1KD-FTV. The top-of-the-line 4x4 model was equipped with the 1KD-FTV engine with D-4D technology and came with a 4-speed automatic transmission and a low range transfer case.

In October 2011, the Fortuner received a new front fascia, headlights and tail lights alongside the facelifted Innova and Hilux. The drivetrains remain the same.

In September 2012, the 2.5-litre 2KD-FTV diesel engine was upgraded with Variable Nozzle Turbocharger (VNT) with intercooler. According to Toyota Motor Philippines, the engine would have improved fuel efficiency and produce additional power by 40% and increase torque by 30%. A new feature for the Fortuner 4×4 V diesel and 4×2 G diesel automatic variants was an audio system with GPS.

==== GCC ====
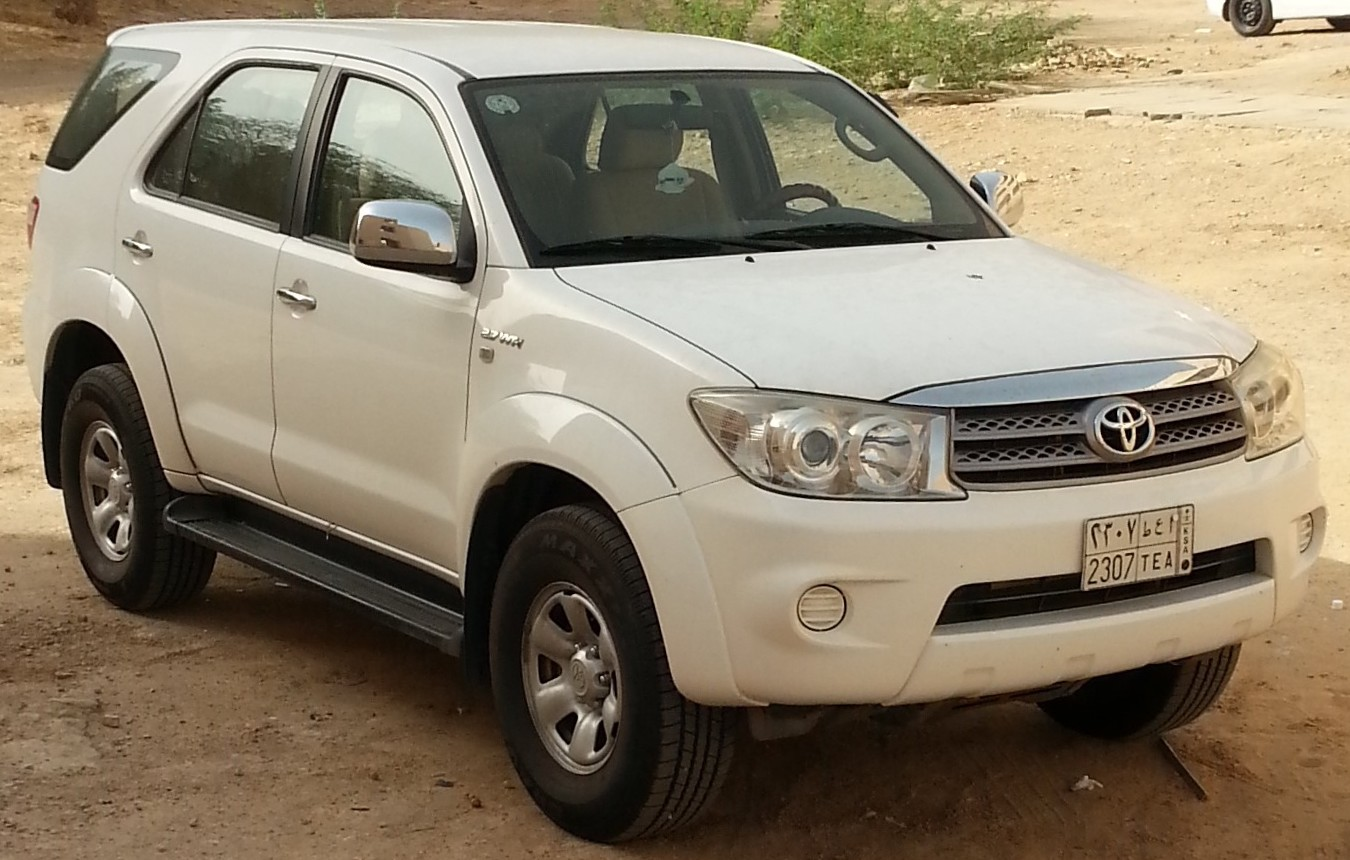
Fortuner (TGN61; first facelift, Saudi Arabia)

In Saudi Arabia and the UAE, the Fortuner was launched in 2005. There are two grades sold in Saudi Arabia, called the "GX" and the "VX" grades. The GX came with the 2.7-litre engine and 5-speed manual as standard (4-speed automatic is an option) and optional 4×4 whereas the VX came with the 4.0-litre V6 1GR-FE with standard 4×4 and all wheel drive with either a 5-speed automatic or 5-speed manual transmission. There is no diesel variant available.

In the UAE, when the facelifted version was released the Fortuner was available in two variants, the 2.7-litre petrol engine and 4.0-litre petrol engine. In 2015 the Fortuner in the UAE came available with TRD body kits. As of 2015, the Fortuner is available in four variants: 2.7 EXR, 2.7 TRD Sportivo, 4.0 GXR, 4.0 VXR and 4.0 TRD Sportivo.

==== Singapore ====
The Fortuner was introduced in 2005 in Singapore by Borneo Motors (Toyota's authorised dealer in Singapore), with the 2.7 V grade being the only available model. It received two facelifts, with changes to the headlight and tail light clusters in its first facelift in 2008, and new bumpers and grille design, new headlamp and clear tail lamp clusters, and blackwood grain trim in its interior for the second facelift in 2011. Later models included a touchscreen telematics navigation system. Due to the car's height (1.85 m), the car cannot clear the height limit in some Singaporean car parks.

==== South Africa ====
The Fortuner was unveiled in South Africa in 2005 and launched in 2006 becoming the best-selling SUV since its launch. Toyota released an updated model in 2009. In 2011, the Fortuner benefited from another facelift, together with its sibling the Hilux. A 2.5-litre diesel engine was added to the newly facelifted range. Again in 2013, the Fortuner received some minor interior upgrades notably for the first time; the introduction of a black leather interior. The sound system was also upgraded together with the navigation system.

==== Thailand ====
The Toyota Fortuner was launched in Thailand in November 2004 with two grade levels: the entry-level G, and the top-spec V. All have full-time 4×4. The G model had a 3.0-litre 1KD-FTV engine with common rail diesel, came with a 5-speed manual transmission only. The V models had two engine options available, there were 2.7-litre 2TR-FE petrol engine with VVT-i or 3.0-litre 1KD-FTV engine with common rail diesel, came with a 4-speed automatic transmission only.

The first facelift for the Toyota Fortuner was made available in August 2008, the 2.7 V (4×2), 3.0 V (4×2) and 3.0 V (4×4) with navigator were added to the lineup, the 2.7 V (4×4) was dropped, the 3.0 V models were received Vehicle Stability Control (VSC) and Traction Control (TRC).

The second facelift for the Toyota Fortuner was made available in 2011, with two grade levels: the entry-level G, and the top-spec V. The G model had a 2.5-litre 1KD-FTV engine with common rail diesel, was available in 4×2 with a 5-speed manual transmission. The V models had two engine options available, there were 2.7-litre 2TR-FE petrol engine with VVT-i or 3.0-litre 1KD-FTV engine with common rail diesel. the 2.7-litre petrol engine was available in 4×2 with a 4-speed automatic transmission, while the 3.0-litre diesel engine was available in either 4×2 or 4×4 with a 4-speed automatic transmission.

==== Venezuela ====
Two grades are available for 2011 – 4×4 and 4×2 – both with the 4.0-litre V6 engine. The assembly plant is located in Cumaná.

==== Vietnam ====
In February 2009, Toyota Motor Vietnam (TMV) started to produce the Fortuner. It quickly occupied the first position in the medium high SUV segment, with the accumulated sales of nearly 25,000 units with a steady SUV market share at 64% with 6,129 units sold in 2012.

=== Facelifts ===
==== 2008 ====
A minor redesign of the Fortuner was launched in July 2008. It was first unveiled in Thailand, and then at the 16th Indonesia International Motor Show. It features new projector headlamps and grille, new rear lights, Bluetooth connectivity, new light sand interior, electronic adjustable driver's seat in 4×4 V model, rear air conditioning from ceiling for second, and third row which was originally located on the sides. Electronic Brake Force Distribution, with Brake Assist replacing LSPV in some models only.

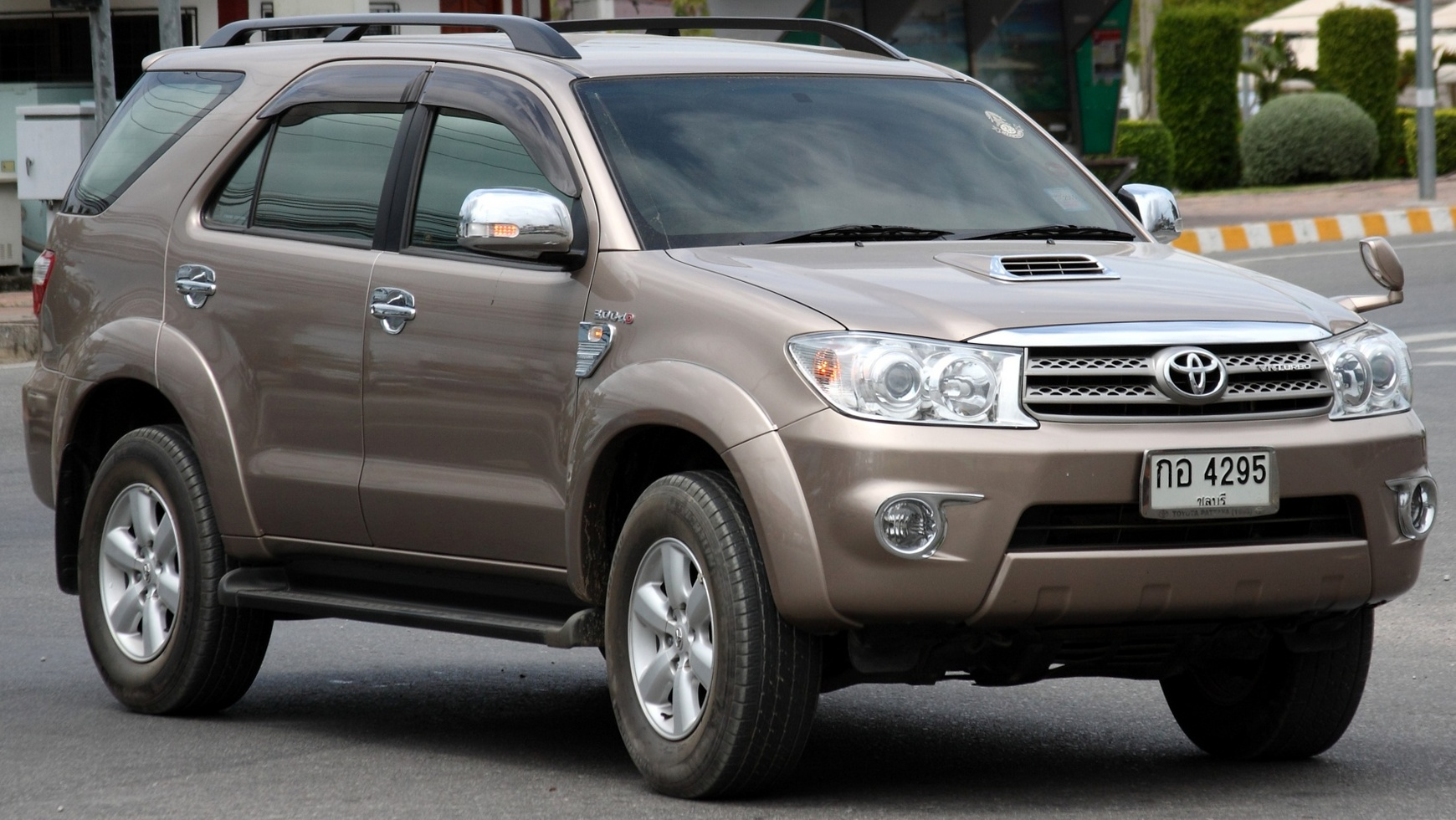
Fortuner 3.0 (KUN61; first facelift, Thailand)

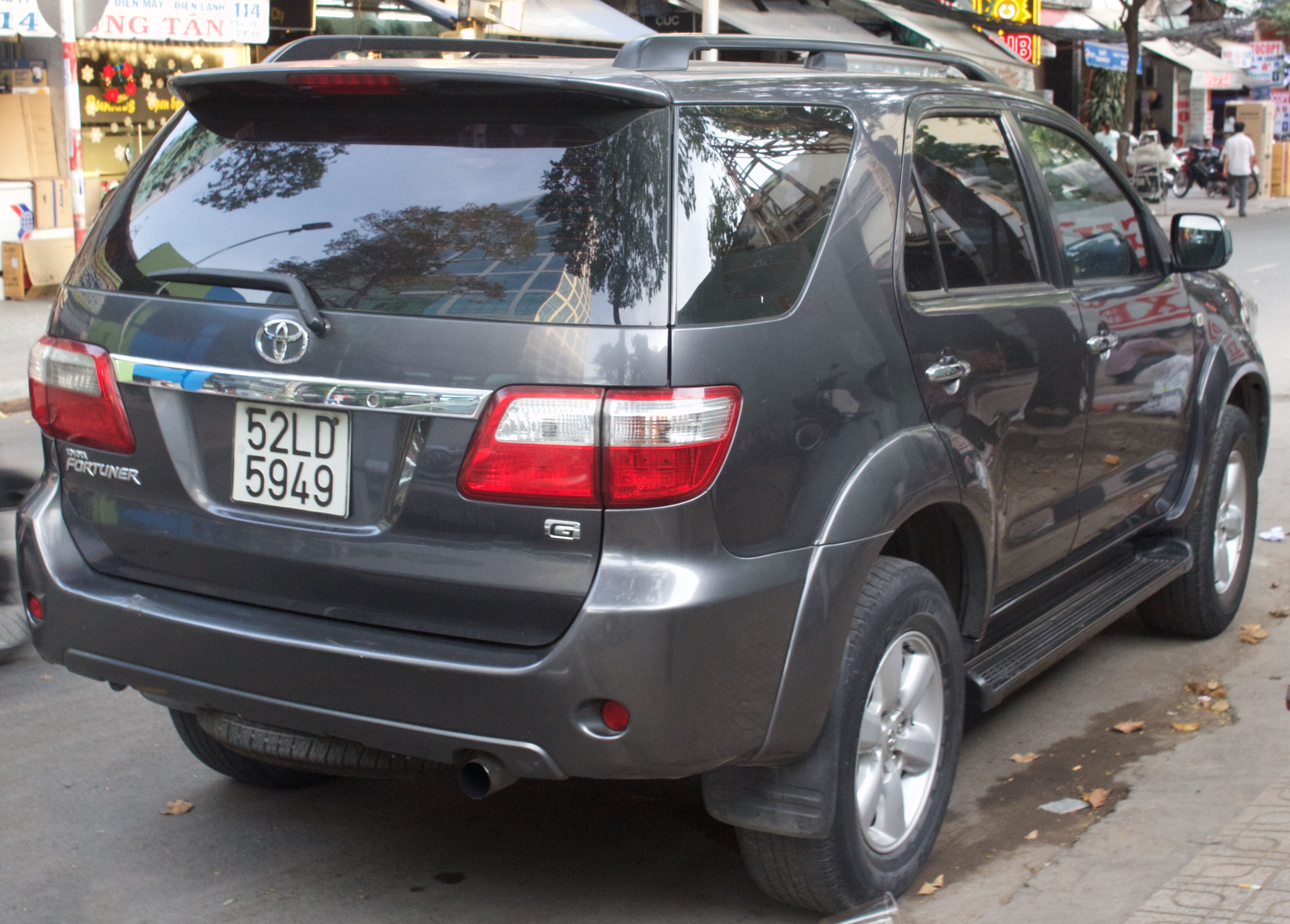
2008–2010 Fortuner G (AN60; first facelift, Vietnam)

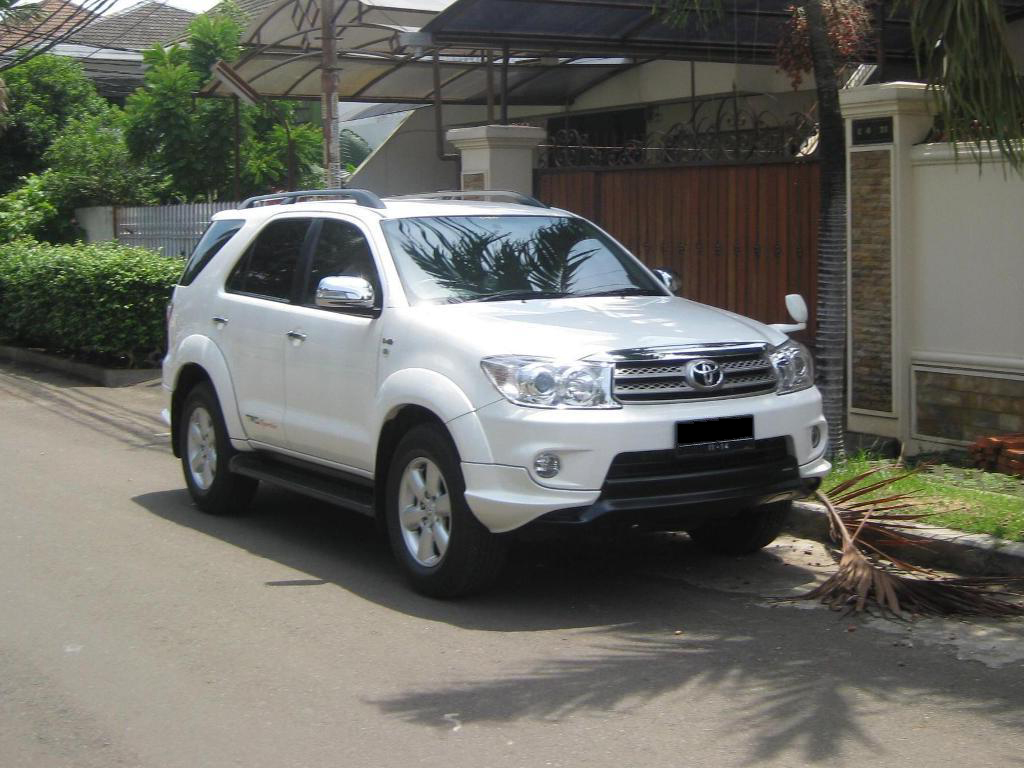
2009 Fortuner 2.5 G TRD Sportivo 4x2 (KUN60; first facelift, Indonesia)

==== 2011 ====
The second facelift Fortuner was introduced in July 2011. It was first unveiled in Bangkok, Thailand. The front fascia was completely revised with a new fender, hood, grille, headlamps, tail lamps, bumper and fog light housing, similar to the J200 Land Cruiser. The tail lamps were redesigned with clear housing similar to the first generation Lexus RX.

The rear bumper, rear garnish plate were also revised. Changes in the sides includes new sharper fender flares, LED integrated side view mirrors and the wheels was also redesigned similar to the 2012 Hilux. Minor changes were also made to the interior including the centre console, steering wheel and audio/video system were also upgraded. The Fortuner later also received a new VNT (Variable Nozzle Turbo) intercooled turbo engine.

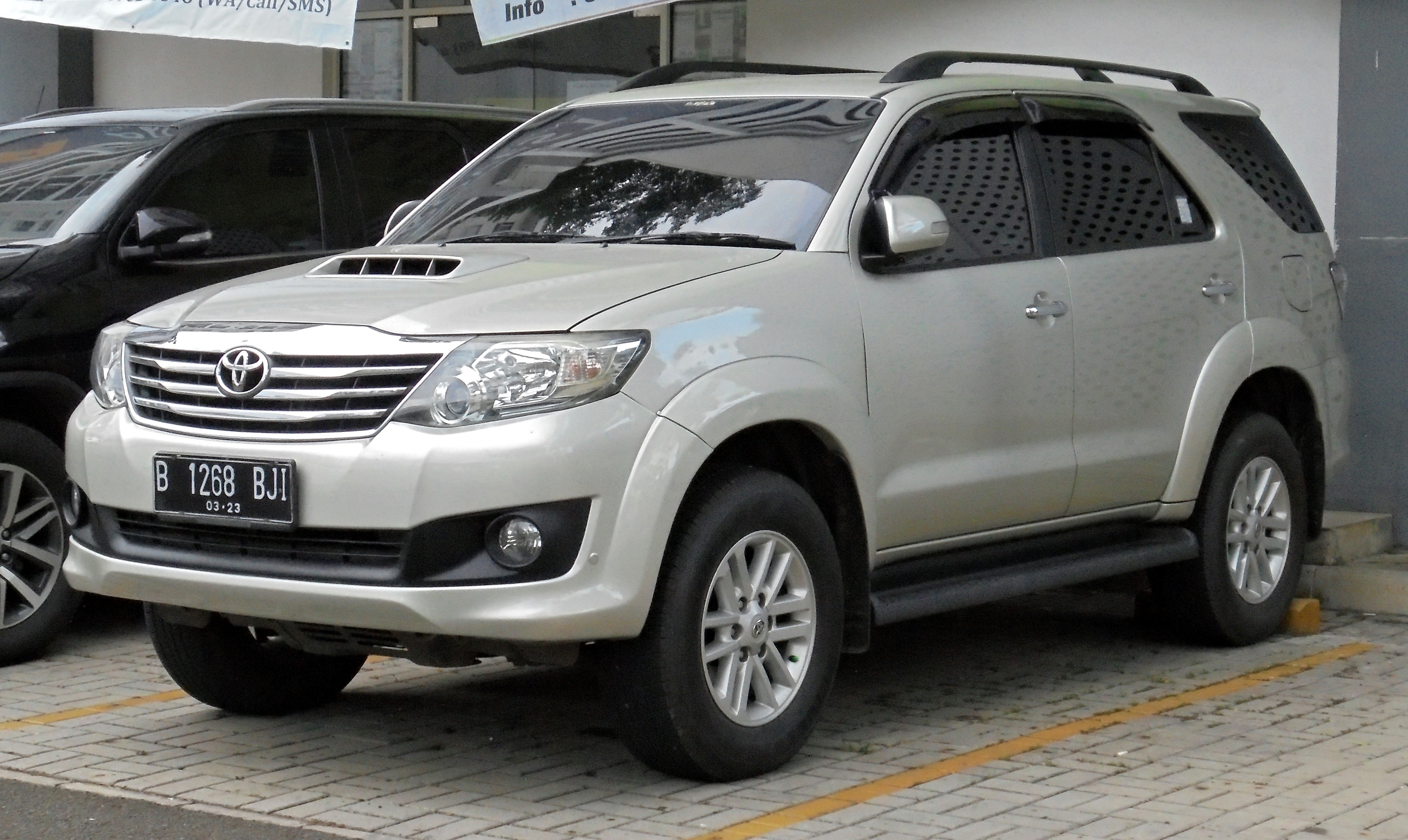
2013 Fortuner 2.5 G 4x2 (KUN60; second facelift, Indonesia)

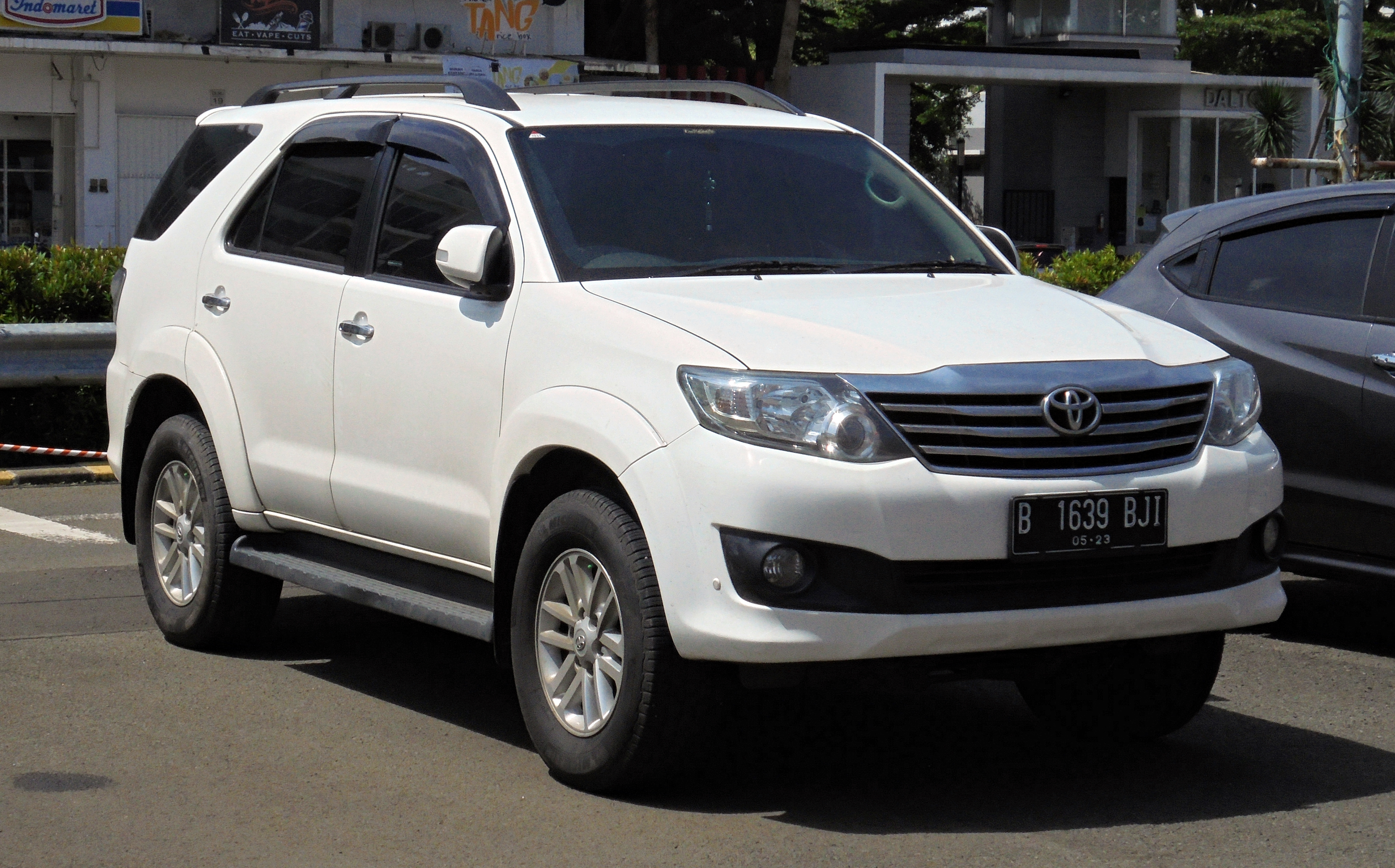
2013 Fortuner 2.7 G LUX 4x2 (TGN61; second facelift, Indonesia)

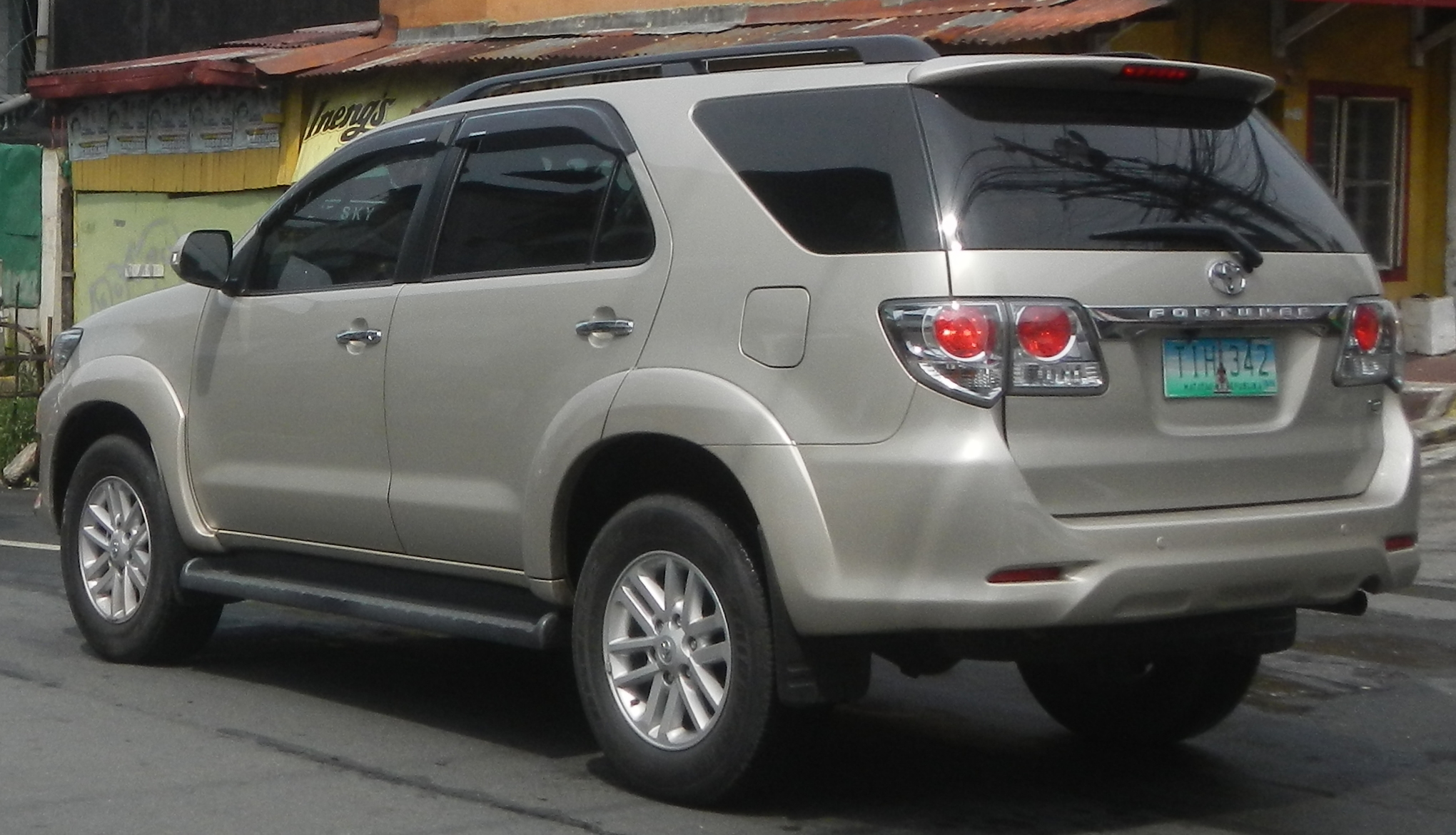
2012 Fortuner 2.7 G (KUN60; second facelift, Philippines)

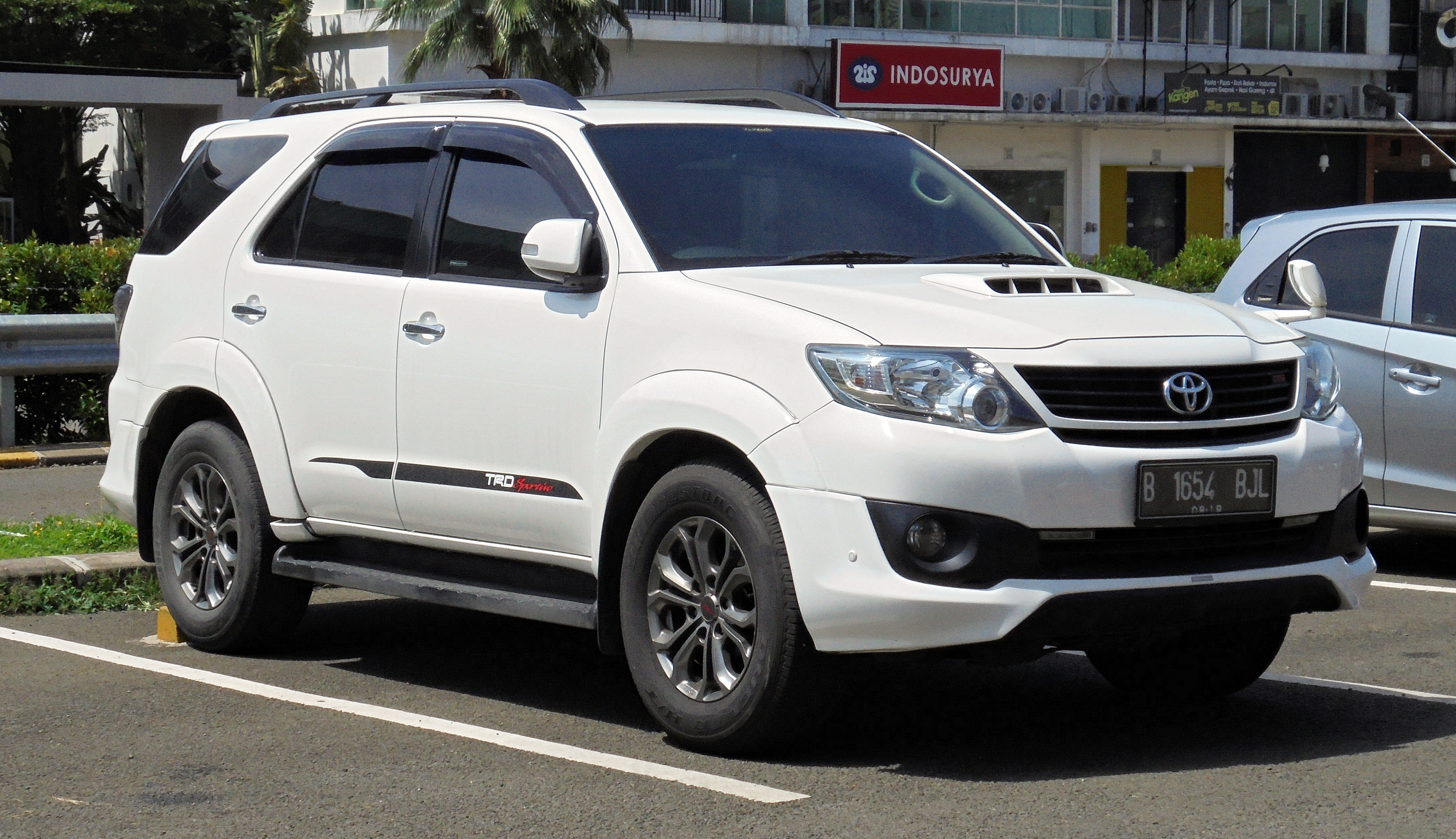
2013 Fortuner 2.5 G TRD Sportivo 4x2 (KUN60; second facelift, Indonesia)

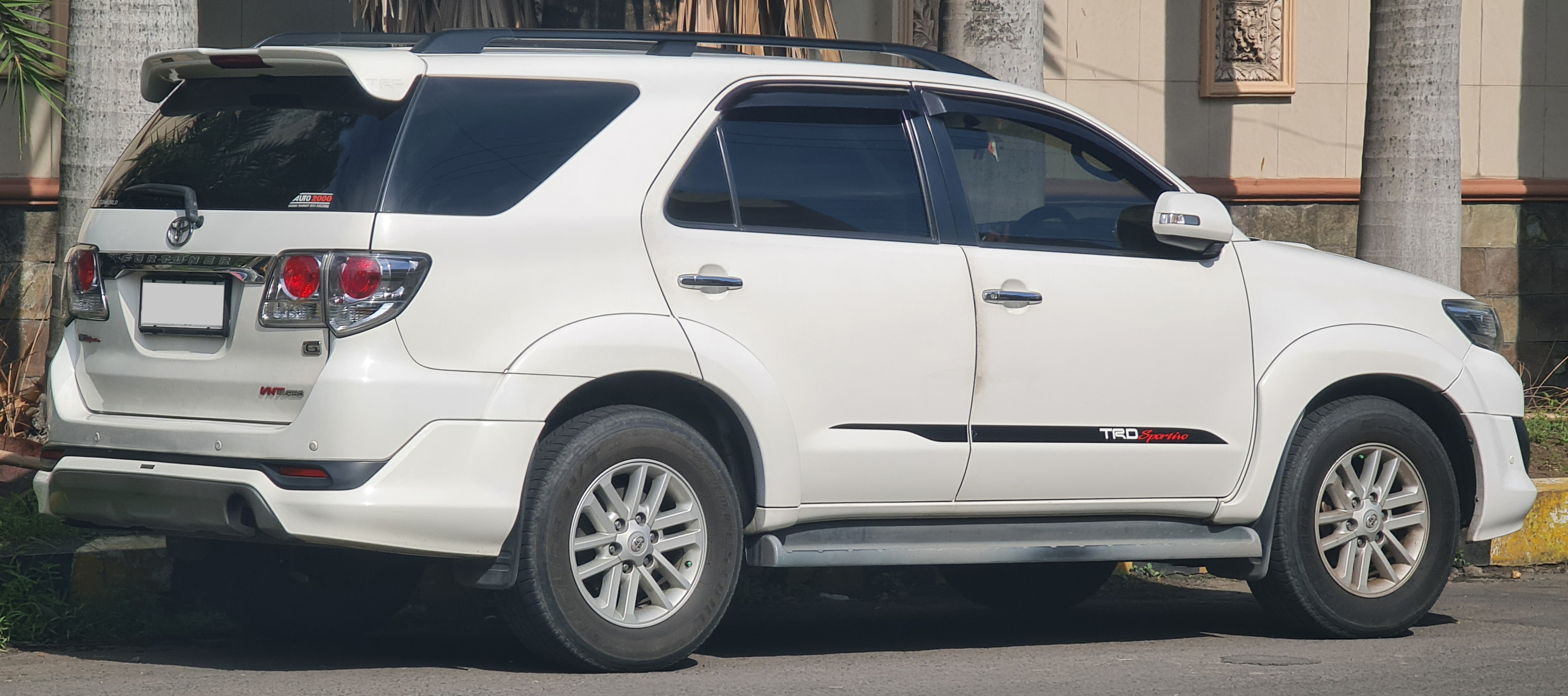
2013 Fortuner 2.5 G TRD Sportivo 4x2 (KUN60; second facelift, Indonesia)

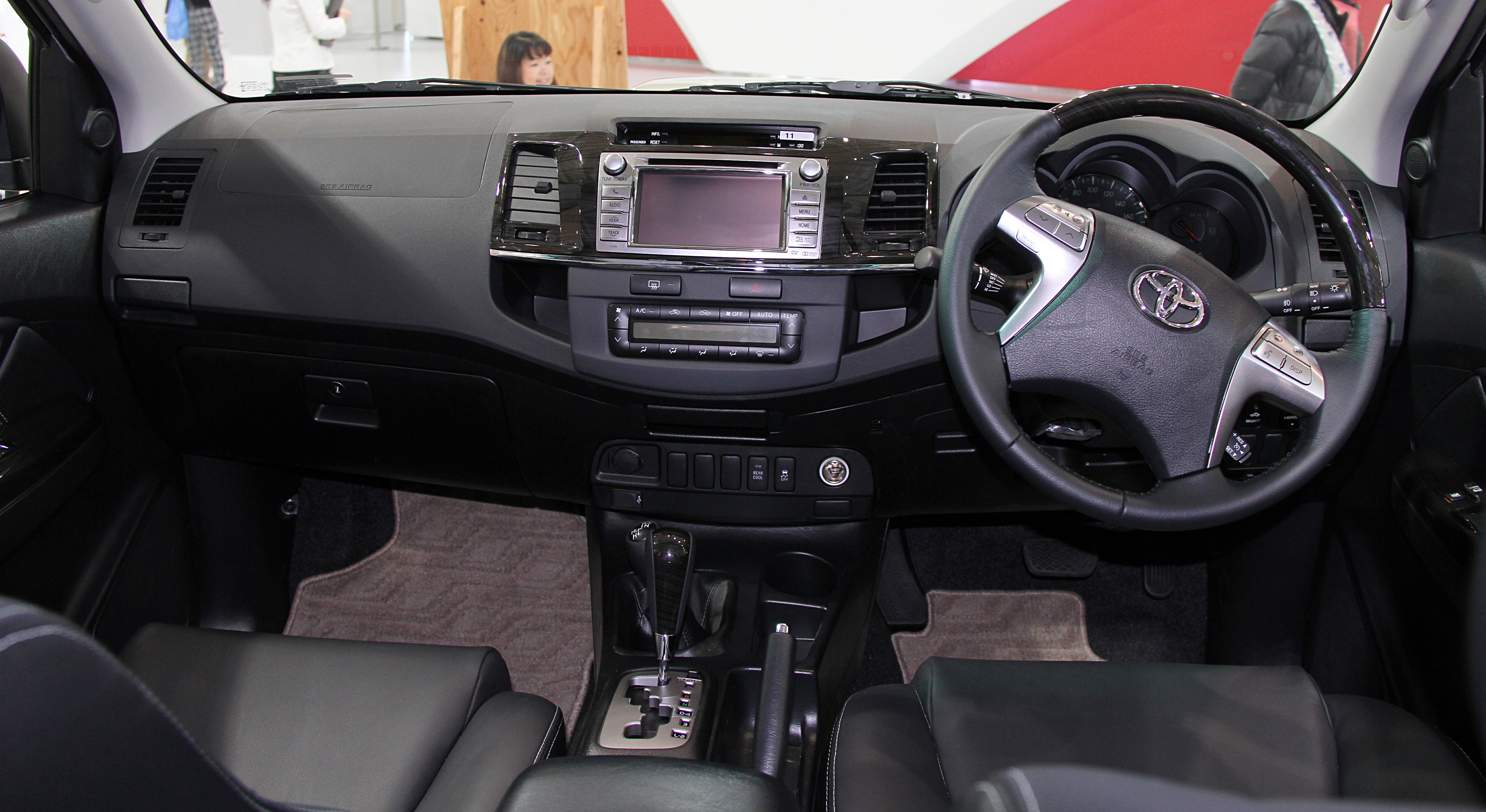
Interior (second facelift)

== Second generation (AN150/AN160; 2015) ==
Second generation
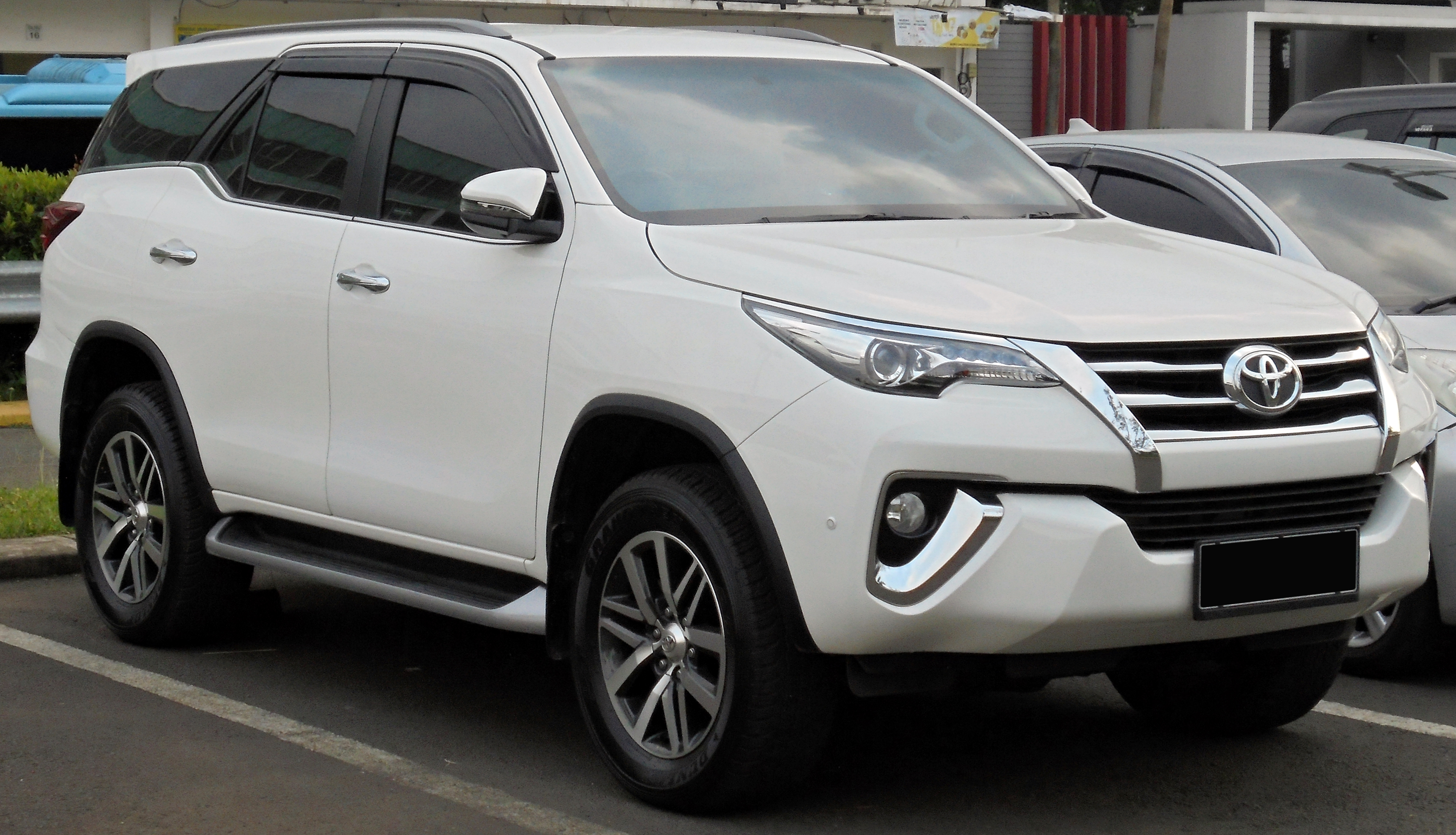
- 2018 Fortuner 2.4 VRZ 4x2 (GUN165; pre-facelift, Indonesia)

Overview
- Model code: AN150 (4WD models); AN160 (2WD models)
- Also called: Toyota SW4
- Production: July 2015–present
- Assembly: Argentina: Zárate (TASA); Cambodia: Phnom Penh (TTMC); Egypt: Cairo (AOI); India: Bidadi (TKM); Indonesia: Karawang (TMMIN, Plant 1); Kenya: Mombasa (CFAO Motors); Malaysia: Shah Alam (UMW); Pakistan: Karachi (IMC); South Africa: Prospecton (TSAM); Thailand: Ban Pho (TMT); Vietnam: Phúc Yên (TMV)
- Designer: Satoshi Okamoto, Takanori Ito and Tokuharu Mino; Akbar Juniarto, Muhammad Arief, Prana Jiwandhana and Supriyatno (2019 TRD Sportivo); Heng-Pin Chang and Tien-Tzu Lin (2020 facelift); Pei-Cheng Hsieh and Peter Anthony Elliott (Legender-based GR Sport)

Body and chassis
- Related: Toyota Hilux (AN120/AN130); Toyota Hilux Champ; Toyota Land Cruiser FJ; Toyota Innova (AN140)

Powertrain
- Engine: Petrol: 2.7 L 2TR-FE Dual VVT-i I4 (TGN156/166); 4.0 L 1GR-FE Dual VVT-i V6 (GGN155/165); Diesel: 2.4 L 2GD-FTV D-4D turbo I4 (GUN155/165); 2.5 L 2KD-FTV D-4D turbo I4 (KUN155/165); 2.8 L 1GD-FTV D-4D turbo I4 (GUN156/166); 3.0 L 5L-E I4 (LAN155); 3.0 L 1KD-FTV D-4D turbo I4 (KUN156/166)
- Transmission: 5-speed R151/R151F manual; 6-speed RC60 manual; 5-speed A750F automatic; 6-speed AC60E/AC60F automatic

Dimensions
- Wheelbase: 2,750 mm (108.3 in)
- Length: 4,795 mm (188.8 in)
- Width: 1,855 mm (73.0 in)
- Height: 1,835–1,850 mm (72.2–72.8 in)
- Curb weight: 1,850–2,135 kg (4,079–4,707 lb)

The second-generation Fortuner was unveiled simultaneously on 16 July 2015 in Australia (making the debut of the nameplate there) and Thailand. Along with the Hilux, the Fortuner features the "Keen Look" design language. Both the Hilux and Fortuner share the chassis, transmission and engine lineup, with two new diesel engines from the GD series.

The 2.7-litre and 4.0-litre petrol engines were updated with Dual VVT-i. The second-generation Fortuner features a part-time 4×4 system instead of the full-time 4×4 system used in the previous generation.

The development of the vehicle was led by executive chief engineer Hiroki Nakajima. Despite sharing the bonnet panels, front pillar area, windscreen glass and front doors as the Hilux, the exterior of the Fortuner has been described as more slim-looking, featuring slim headlights with bi-beam LED projector as an option and blacked-out D-pillars for a "floating roof" look.

Toyota designers drew inspiration from their own Land Cruiser and Land Cruiser Prado heritage, as a means of differentiating the Fortuner from competing body-on-frame SUV rivals.

Since this generation, the Fortuner no longer shares the interior design with the Hilux to give a 'distinct character' between the two. As the result, the interior took an upwards step in perceived quality with an upright dashboard design with synthetic leather trims with stitching, a three-spoke steering wheel shared with the Hilux and a modern instrument cluster with a large colour TFT LCD multi-info display.

The Fortuner also features larger cross sections for its ladder frame, and sits on double wishbone front suspension and five-link rear suspension with coil springs. The rear differential lock also has its componentry placed within the differential housing for improved off-road protection.

All variants are equipped with ABS, EBD, dual airbags plus knee airbag, "follow me home" light function, all around sensor, glove box with chiller function, digital automatic climate control, all auto power windows along with tilt and telescopic steering wheel as standard.

All variants also have Eco Mode and Power Mode features to adjust throttle responses. The front braking system consists of 17-inch disc brakes, whilst the rear braking system uses drum brakes, except in Australia and India where disc brakes are used all around. In 2017, the Fortuner was upgraded to disc brakes all around in all markets. In the third row, the 50:50 split seats continue to flips up onto the body side while being folded instead of folding flat into the floor like on most of its competitors.

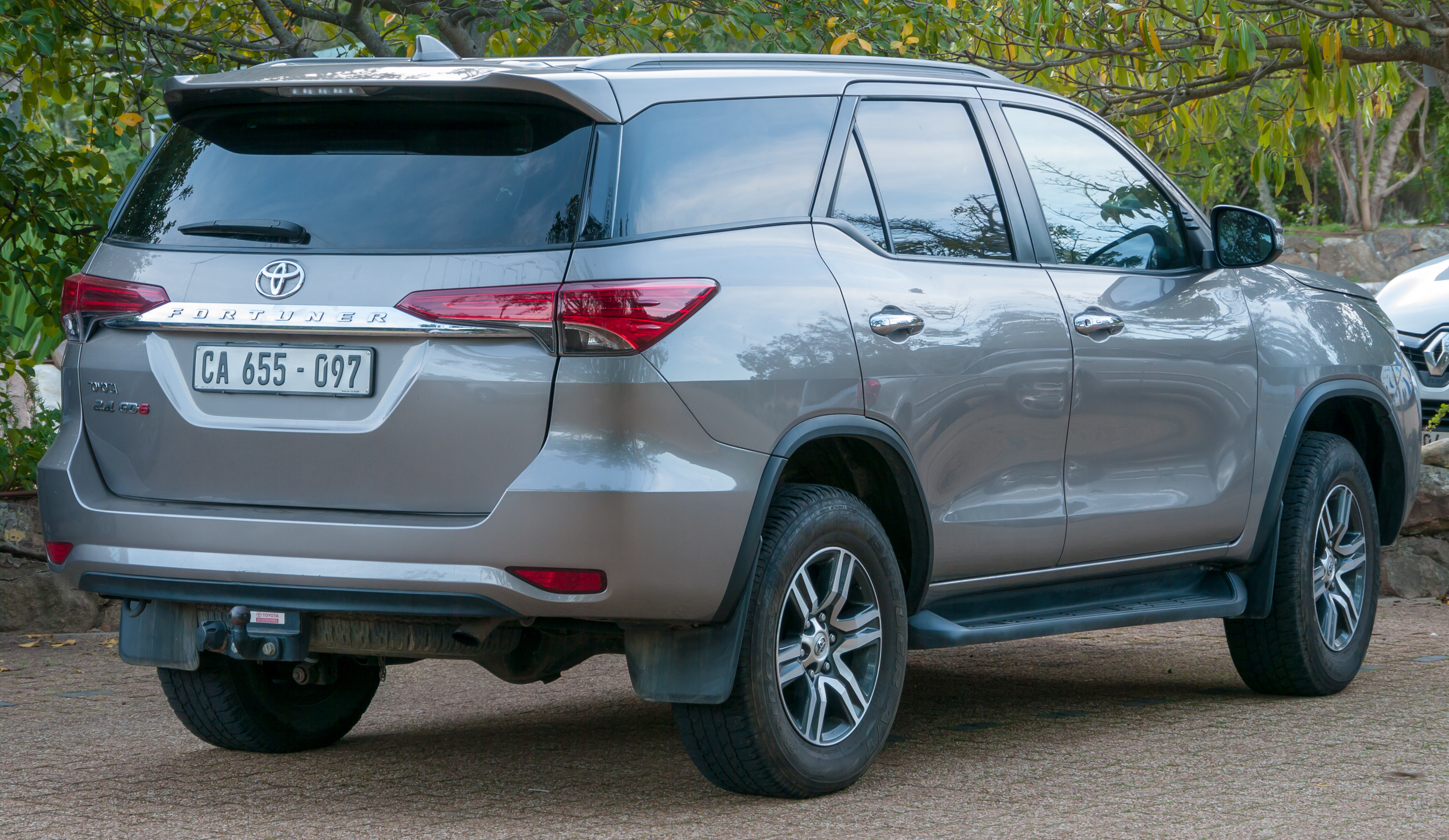
Rear view

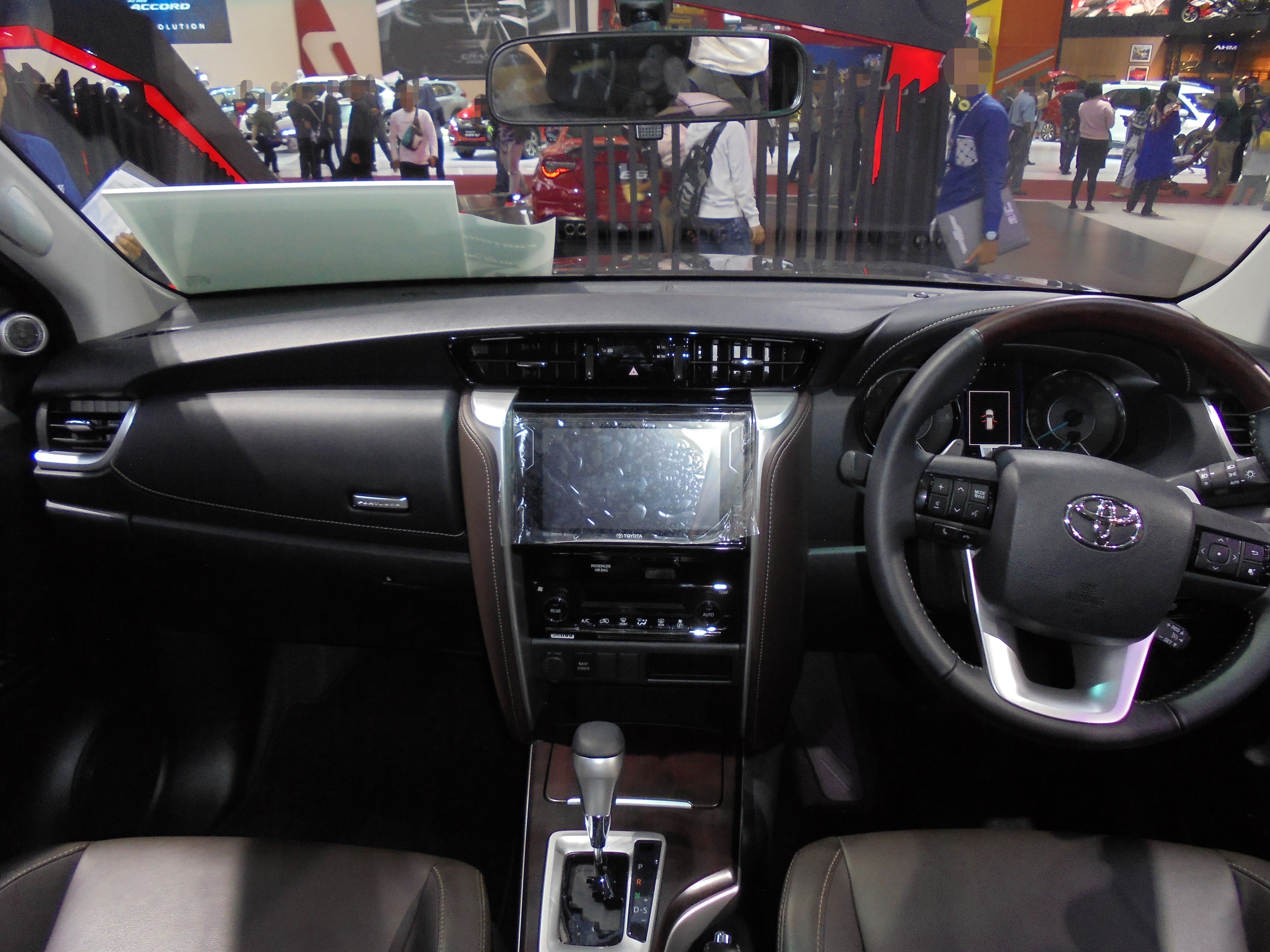
Interior

=== Powertrain ===
The Fortuner is powered by a range of petrol and diesel engines. The two GD series engines are newly developed for this generation, which feature common-rail direct-injection and variable nozzle turbocharging; the 2.8-litre also gets auto start-stop in some markets. The 2.7-litre petrol engine is lighter and equipped with Dual VVT-i, improved combustion and less friction.

Petrol engines
Model	Engine	Transmission	Power	Torque
2.7	2.7 L 2TR-FE inline-4 fuel-injected petrol with Dual VVT-i	R151/R151F 5-speed manual	122 kW (164 hp; 166 PS) at 5,200 rpm	245 N⋅m (25.0 kg⋅m; 181 lb⋅ft) at 4,000 rpm
2.7	2.7 L 2TR-FE inline-4 fuel-injected petrol with Dual VVT-i	AC60E/AC60F 6-speed automatic	122 kW (164 hp; 166 PS) at 5,200 rpm	245 N⋅m (25.0 kg⋅m; 181 lb⋅ft) at 4,000 rpm
4.0	4.0 L 1GR-FE V6 fuel-injected petrol	AC60E/AC60F 6-speed automatic	175 kW (235 hp; 238 PS) at 5,200 rpm	376 N⋅m (38.3 kg⋅m; 277 lb⋅ft) at 3,800 rpm
Diesel engines
Model	Engine	Transmission	Power	Torque
2.4	2.4 L 2GD-FTV inline-4 common rail diesel with VNT	RC60 6-speed manual	110 kW (148 hp; 150 PS) at 3,400 rpm	400 N⋅m (40.8 kg⋅m; 295 lb⋅ft) at 1,600–2,400 rpm
2.4	2.4 L 2GD-FTV inline-4 common rail diesel with VNT	AC60E/AC60F 6-speed automatic	110 kW (148 hp; 150 PS) at 3,400 rpm	400 N⋅m (40.8 kg⋅m; 295 lb⋅ft) at 1,600–2,400 rpm
2.5	2.5 L 2KD-FTV High Version inline-4 common rail diesel without intercooler	RC61 6-speed manual	75 kW (101 hp; 102 PS) at 3,600 rpm	260 N⋅m (26.5 kg⋅m; 192 lb⋅ft) at 1,600–2,400 rpm
2.8	2.8 L 1GD-FTV inline-4 common rail intercooled diesel with VNT	RC61/RC61F 6-speed manual	130 kW (174 hp; 177 PS) at 3,400 rpm (2015–2020); 150 kW (201 hp; 204 PS) at 3,400 rpm (2020–present)	420 N⋅m (42.8 kg⋅m; 310 lb⋅ft) at 1,400–2,600 rpm (2015–2020)/1,400–3,400 rpm (2020–present)
2.8	2.8 L 1GD-FTV inline-4 common rail intercooled diesel with VNT	AC60E/AC60F 6-speed automatic	130 kW (174 hp; 177 PS) at 3,400 rpm (2015–2020); 150 kW (201 hp; 204 PS) at 3,000-3,400 rpm (2020–present); 165 kW (221 hp; 224 PS) at 3,400 rpm (GR Sport for some markets, 2023–present)	450 N⋅m (45.9 kg⋅m; 332 lb⋅ft) at 1,600–2,400 rpm (2015–2020); 500 N⋅m (51.0 kg⋅m; 369 lb⋅ft) at 1,600–2,800 rpm (2020–present); 550 N⋅m (56.1 kg⋅m; 406 lb⋅ft) at 1,600–2,800 rpm (GR Sport for some markets, 2023–present)
3.0	3.0 L 1KD-FTV inline-4 common rail intercooled diesel with VNT	RC61F 6-speed Manual	120 kW (161 hp; 163 PS) at 3,400 rpm	343 N⋅m (35.0 kg⋅m; 253 lb⋅ft) at 1,400–3,400 rpm
3.0	3.0 L 1KD-FTV inline-4 common rail intercooled diesel with VNT	A750F 5-speed automatic	120 kW (161 hp; 163 PS) at 3,400 rpm	360 N⋅m (36.7 kg⋅m; 266 lb⋅ft) at 1,600–3,400 rpm
3.0	3.0 L 5L-E inline-4 naturally aspirated diesel	R151F 5-speed manual	70 kW (94 hp; 95 PS) at 4,000 rpm	197 N⋅m (20.1 kg⋅m; 145 lb⋅ft) at 2,200 rpm

=== Markets ===
==== Argentina ====
The second-generation Fortuner was launched in Argentina as the SW4 on 21 December 2015. Locally assembled in Zárate, it is available in the sole SRX trim powered by the 2.8-litre turbo diesel engine.

The facelifted model was launched in Argentina on 24 November 2020, with three variants: SR AT6, SRX MT and SRX AT6, all variants are powered by the 2.8-litre turbo diesel engine and standard four-wheel drive. In November 2021, the Diamond and GR Sport variants were introduced to the line-up. In November 2022, the SR AT6 and SRX MT variants were discontinued. In November 2023, the SW4 line-up was updated with redesigned front and rear fascias and became available in the sole SRX variant powered by the 2.8-litre turbo diesel engine with standard four-wheel drive.

==== Australia ====
The Fortuner was unveiled in Australia in July 2015 and went on sale in October 2015. It was sold only with 4×4, 2.8-litre turbo diesel with either a six-speed manual transmission or a six-speed automatic transmission. Three model grades were available: GX, GXL and Crusade.

The facelifted model went on sale in Australia on 13 August 2020, with the same grades and engine option from the pre-facelift model. The six-speed manual transmission was discontinued.

Starting from 2022, some grade levels of the Australian market Fortuner were imported from Indonesia.

In November 2025, Toyota Australia announced that it will discontinue the Fortuner in mid-2026 due to poor sales figures.

==== Brazil ====
The second-generation Fortuner was launched in Brazil as the SW4 on 17 February 2016, in the sole SRX trim with 5 and 7-seat configurations. For engines, it was available with a 4.0-litre V6 petrol or a 2.8-litre turbo-diesel engines.

The facelifted model was launched in Brazil on 24 November 2020, with three trim levels: SR, SRV and SRX, with 5 and 7-seat configurations. For engines, the SR and SRV trims use the 2.7-litre flex-fuel petrol engine, while the SRX trim use the 2.8-litre turbo-diesel engine. In November 2021, the Diamond trim was introduced to the line-up and the 2.7-litre flex-fuel petrol engine was discontinued, therefore the 2.8-litre turbo-diesel engine became the sole engine option for the SW4. In December 2021, the GR Sport trim was introduced to the line-up. In November 2023, the entry-level SRX Platinum trim with 5 and 7-seat configurations was introduced to the line-up, the regular SRX trim was discontinued.

==== Cambodia ====
The second-generation Fortuner was introduced to the Cambodian market in 2017 in a single V 4×4 grade powered by a 2.8-litre diesel engine mated to a six-speed automatic transmission.

Local assembly for the Cambodian market began in May 2024 at the Phnom Penh Special Economic Zone by TTMC, alongside the Hilux.

The locally assembled Fortuner is offered in the Legender 2.8-litre diesel 4×4 trim. Standard equipment includes bi-LED headlamps, wireless Apple CarPlay and Android Auto, and Toyota Safety Sense active safety suite.

==== Egypt ====
The second generation of the Toyota Fortuner made its debut in Egypt in 2018, with the top trim receiving a facelift for the 2024 model year. The Fortuner comes in three grades as of the 2025 model year: the Smart 4×2, which has the 2.7-litre 2TR-FE engine, the Elegance 4×4, and the Sport trim, which use the 1GR-FE engine. The Toyota Fortuner is assembled in Egypt, being assembled at the Arab Organization for Industrialization.

==== India ====
The second generation Fortuner was launched in November 2016 with two engine options, 2.8-litre diesel and 2.7-litre petrol with either manual or automatic transmission, 4×2 or 4×4.

In early 2020, the Indian market Fortuner was upgraded to meet the Bharat Stage 6 emissions standards, which necessitate the addition of diesel particulate filter (DPF).

The facelifted Fortuner was launched in India in January 2021, which is offered in both standard and Legender grades. In May 2022, the GR Sport variant was released as the highest grade.

On 2 June 2025, the 2.8-litre turbo-diesel 48V mild hybrid (MHEV) option, marketed as Neo Drive 48V was introduced to the lineup.

==== Indonesia ====
The second generation Fortuner was launched in January 2016. Initial grade models were G (diesel, available in 4×2 with manual and automatic transmission, and 4×4 with automatic unit), VRZ (diesel, available in either 4×2 or 4×4, only with automatic transmission), and SRZ (petrol 4×2 automatic). Initial engine options were the 2.7-litre petrol engine or the 2.4-litre diesel engine.

The TRD Sportivo body kits were also available for the SRZ and VRZ variants (4×2 only) from August 2017 up to August 2021. In August 2018, the Fortuner was updated to comply with the Euro 4 emission standards. The TRD Sportivo model received a minor update in July 2019.

The facelifted Fortuner was launched in Indonesia in October 2020. In August 2021, the TRD Sportivo variant was renamed to GR Sport while the standard SRZ grade was removed from the lineup, leaving only its GR Sport variant.

In January 2022, the 2.4-litre diesel engine option for VRZ grade and its GR Sport variant was replaced with the 2.8-litre unit. The standard 4×4 VRZ grade was also replaced by its GR Sport variant with the 2.8-litre diesel engine, alongside the discontinuation of 4×4 G grade.

In September 2024, the VRZ and SRZ grades received fascias from the Legender model with the GR Sport grade aligned to international models. GR Parts aero package and Toyota Safety Sense are offered as options for the 4×2 VRZ grade. The standard SRZ and 4×4 VRZ grades were also re-added into the lineup.

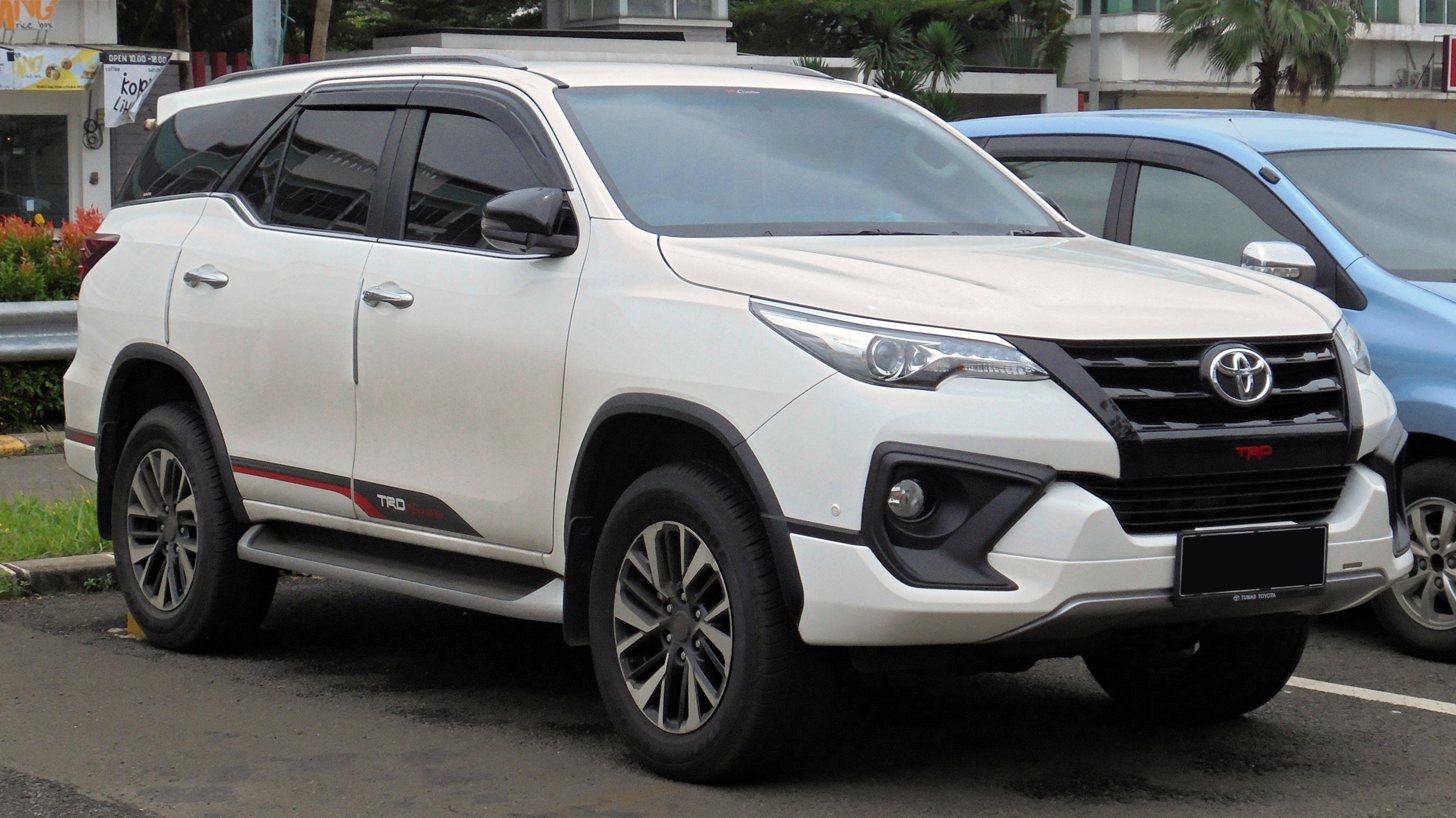
2018 Fortuner 2.4 VRZ TRD Sportivo 4x2 (GUN165; pre-facelift, Indonesia)

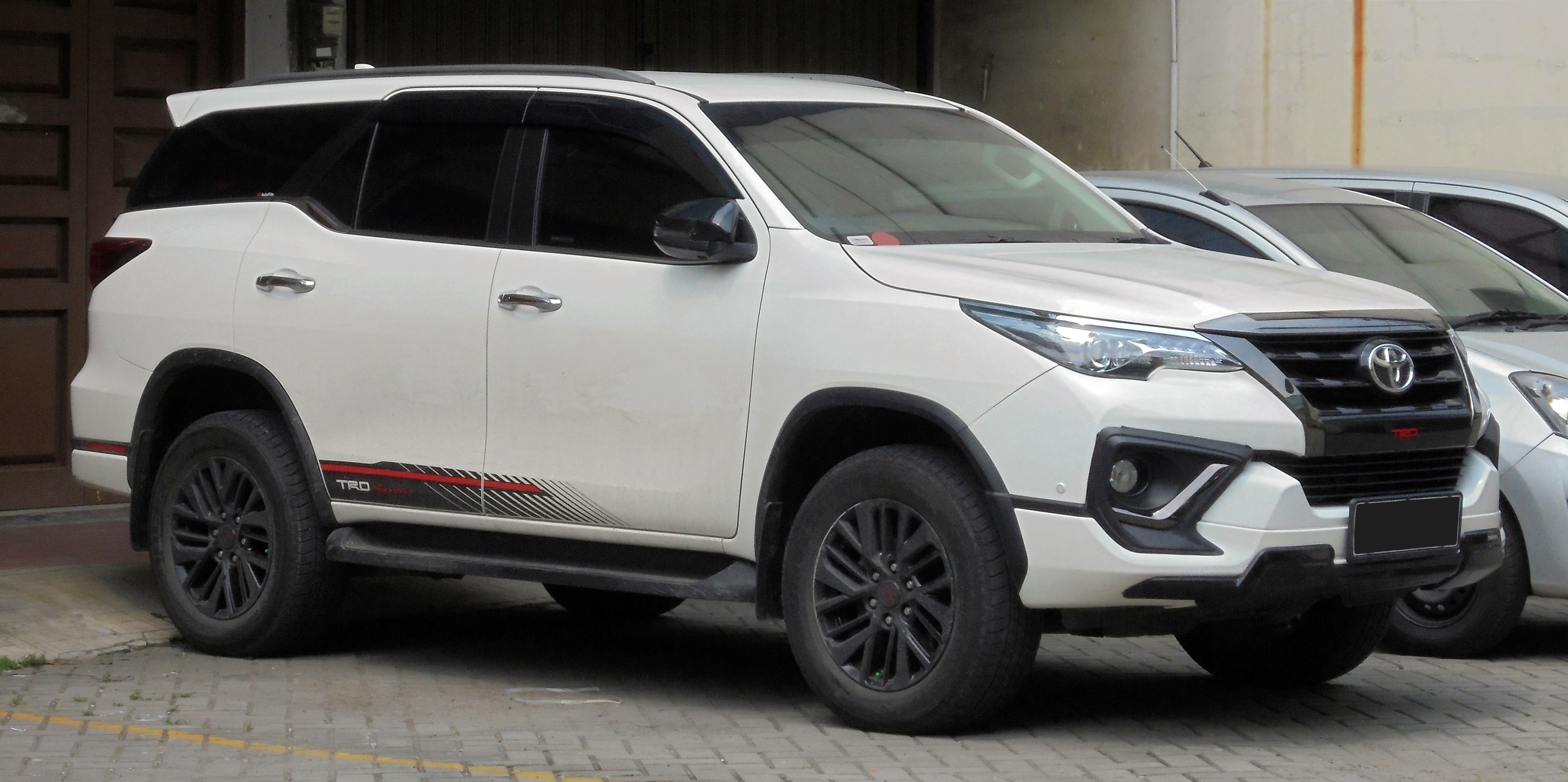
2020 Fortuner 2.4 VRZ TRD Sportivo 4x2 (GUN165; pre-facelift, Indonesia)

==== Laos ====
The second generation Fortuner was launched in March 2016 with one model grade, V 4×4 with 3.0-litre diesel engine and 5-speed automatic transmission. In August 2017, the Fortuner was updated with an introduction of the new 2.8-litre diesel engine that replaced the old 3.0-litre diesel engine used in the outgoing model along with other upgrades.

==== Malaysia ====
The second generation Fortuner was launched in May 2016 and was offered in 2.4 VRZ 4×4 turbodiesel and 2.7 SRZ 4×4 petrol variants with automatic transmissions. In January 2017, both variants obtained "Energy Efficient Vehicle" (EEV) status from the government, which reduced its price. In September 2017, the 2.4 VRZ was renamed as the 2.4 4×4 and two additional grade models were introduced: 2.4 VRZ 4×2 and 2.4 VRZ 4×4.

The facelifted Fortuner was launched in Malaysia in February 2021 alongside the facelifted Innova. It is offered in three variants: 2.4 4×4, 2.7 SRZ 4×4 and 2.8 VRZ 4×4. In November 2021, the Fortuner SRZ and VRZ models was updated with dual-zone automatic climate control as standard along with other upgrades.

On 16 August 2024, the GR Aero body kit was made available as an option for the 2.4-litre 4×4 and 2.7-litre SRZ 4×4 variants. The GR aero body kit features the similar styling as the Indonesian-spec GR Sport variant.

==== Middle East ====
The Fortuner was launched in the GCC countries in March 2016. In the UAE market, it is available with 2.7-litre and 4.0-litre petrol engines, with either 6-speed automatic transmission. It is offered in four grades EXR, GXR, VXR, and the TRD Sportivo. In the Saudi Arabian market, it is available with 2.8-litre and 2.4-litre diesel engines, and 2.7-litre and 4.0-litre petrol engines, with only a 6-speed automatic transmission. It is offered in six grades: GX1, GX2, VX1, VX2, VX2 Plus and VX3.

The facelifted Fortuner was launched in Bahrain, Saudi Arabia, and UAE in August 2021, the TRD Sportivo grade is not offered in the GCC countries.

==== Pakistan ====
The second-generation Fortuner was launched on 27 September 2016 with a petrol variant.

In late 2017, Toyota Indus introduced the Sigma 4 variant of the Fortuner, powered by the 2.8 litre diesel engine.

In January 2020, Toyota Indus introduced the G grade as the base petrol model of the Fortuner.

In early 2022, the Legender variant was added to the lineup.

==== Philippines ====
The second generation Fortuner was launched in the Philippines on 14 January 2016 with two new diesel engines (2.8-litre and 2.4-litre), and an updated 2.7-litre petrol engine. Initial grade levels were the entry-level G and top-spec V.

In August 2017, the Fortuner was refreshed for the 2018 model year. Rear disc brakes became standard on all grades along with other upgrades. The Fortuner became the best-selling car in the Philippines in 2017.

The facelifted Fortuner was launched in the Philippines on 17 October 2020. It is offered in 2.4 G, 2.4 V, 2.8 Q and 2.8 LTD grade levels with the 2.7 G petrol variant being discontinued.

In September 2021, the Fortuner received another feature list upgrade. The V grade received the alloy wheel design of the Q grade.

In December 2023, the Fortuner was updated for the 2024 model year. The Q grade received the same styling as the LTD grade except using a monotone paint finish. All grades received 7 airbags as standard while the V models and up received a 9-inch infotainment system with wireless Apple CarPlay.

==== Russia ====
The Fortuner went on sale in Russia in October 2017. The Fortuner sold in Russia was only available in 4×4 with 2.8-litre turbo-diesel and 2.7-litre petrol engines, with either five-speed manual or six-speed automatic gearbox. Four grade choices were offered: Standard, Comfort, Elegance and Prestige. Fortuners sold in the Russian market were imported from Thailand.

It was discontinued in 2022 after Toyota ceased sales in Russia, following the Russian invasion of Ukraine.

==== South Africa ====
The Fortuner was launched in South Africa on 31 March 2016 with three grades; Entry, Standard and High. For engines, there were four options available: 2.4-litre turbo-diesel, 2.8-litre turbo-diesel, 2.7-litre petrol and 4.0-litre V6 petrol. All variants came standard with rear-wheel drive and 4x4 came as standard on the 4.0-litre V6 petrol but optional on the 2.8-litre turbo-diesel.

The facelifted Fortuner was launched in South Africa in November 2020. The petrol engines were removed from the lineup and manual transmission option for 2.8-litre turbo-diesel was no longer available. The 2.8-litre turbo-diesel 48V mild hybrid (MHEV) option was introduced to the lineup in March 2024, and the sportier GR Sport trim was introduced as the flagship variant in March 2025.

==== Thailand ====
In Thailand, the Fortuner was initially offered in G and V grades, the entry-level G was only available in 4×2 with 2.4-litre turbo-diesel, with 6-speed manual transmission, while the top-spec V was offered in four variants: 2.4 (4×2), 2.7 (4×2), 2.8 (4×2) and 2.8 (4×4), with only a 6-speed automatic transmission.

In March 2016, the TRD Sportivo variant was added to the lineup.

In May 2019, the G grade with the automatic transmission was added to the lineup, the manual transmission option was dropped.

In June 2020, the Legender grade was added to the lineup. It is offered in four variants: 2.4 4×2, 2.4 4×4, 2.8 4×2 and 2.8 4×4.

In August 2021, the Fortuner gained a new body kit by Modellista. In the same month, the GR Sport variant also became available along with the feature list upgrade.

In February 2022, a special variant called the Commander was released. Only 1,000 units were produced.

In August 2022, the regular Fortuner was replaced with Leader G and Leader V grade levels, which share the styling with the upmarket Legender model.

In November 2024, a new base grade called the Leader S was added to the lineup.

In October 2025, a new mid-spec grade called the Leader G+ was added to the lineup.

==== Vietnam ====
The second-generation Fortuner was launched in Vietnam on 5 January 2017, with three variants available at launch: G (4x2), V (4x2) and V (4x4). For engines, the G grade use the 2.4-litre turbocharged diesel engine while the V grade use the 2.7-litre petrol engine. For the Vietnamese market, all variants were imported from Indonesia.

In June 2018, the 2.8 V 4x4 variant was added to the lineup along with other equipment changes.

Locally assembly for the second-generation Fortuner commenced in June 2019 at the Toyota Motor Vietnam plant for the 2.4-litre and 2.8-litre turbocharged diesel engine variants, while the 2.7-litre petrol variants remain imported from Indonesia.

The facelifted model was launched on 17 September 2020, with the introduction of the Legender grade. There were eight variants available for the facelift model at launch: 2.4 M/T (4x2), 2.4 A/T (4x2), 2.4 A/T Legender (4x2), 2.7 A/T (4x2), 2.7 A/T (4x4), 2.8 A/T (4x4) and 2.8 A/T Legender (4x4).

The Legender variants became available with the 2.7–litre petrol engine option in December 2024.

In July 2026, the diesel engine variants were discontinued.

=== Facelift ===
The facelifted Fortuner debuted on 4 June 2020 for the Thai market alongside the facelifted Hilux. The Legender flagship sub-model (known as VRZ in Indonesia and Malaysia, LTD in the Philippines, Diamond in South America, and Black Onyx in Russia) was introduced to replace the Thai market TRD Sportivo model.

The Legender grade is equipped with a different headlight units from the standard grades and different front and rear bumper designs which designed to be in-line with Toyota crossover SUVs. It is also equipped with 20-inch wheels, interior ambient lighting, two-tone leather seats, JBL sound system, and a set of Toyota Safety Sense active safety systems. The 2.8-litre 1GD-FTV diesel engine received an upgrade, producing 204 PS (201 hp; 150 kW) and 500 N⋅m (51.0 kg⋅m; 369 lb⋅ft) of torque.

The Legender-based GR Sport variant was launched in Thailand on 26 August 2021, in the Philippines on 23 October 2021, in Brazil on 8 December 2021, in India on 12 May 2022, in Pakistan on 18 March 2023 and in Indonesia on 6 September 2024. It is only available in 2.8-litre diesel engine option with 4×4.

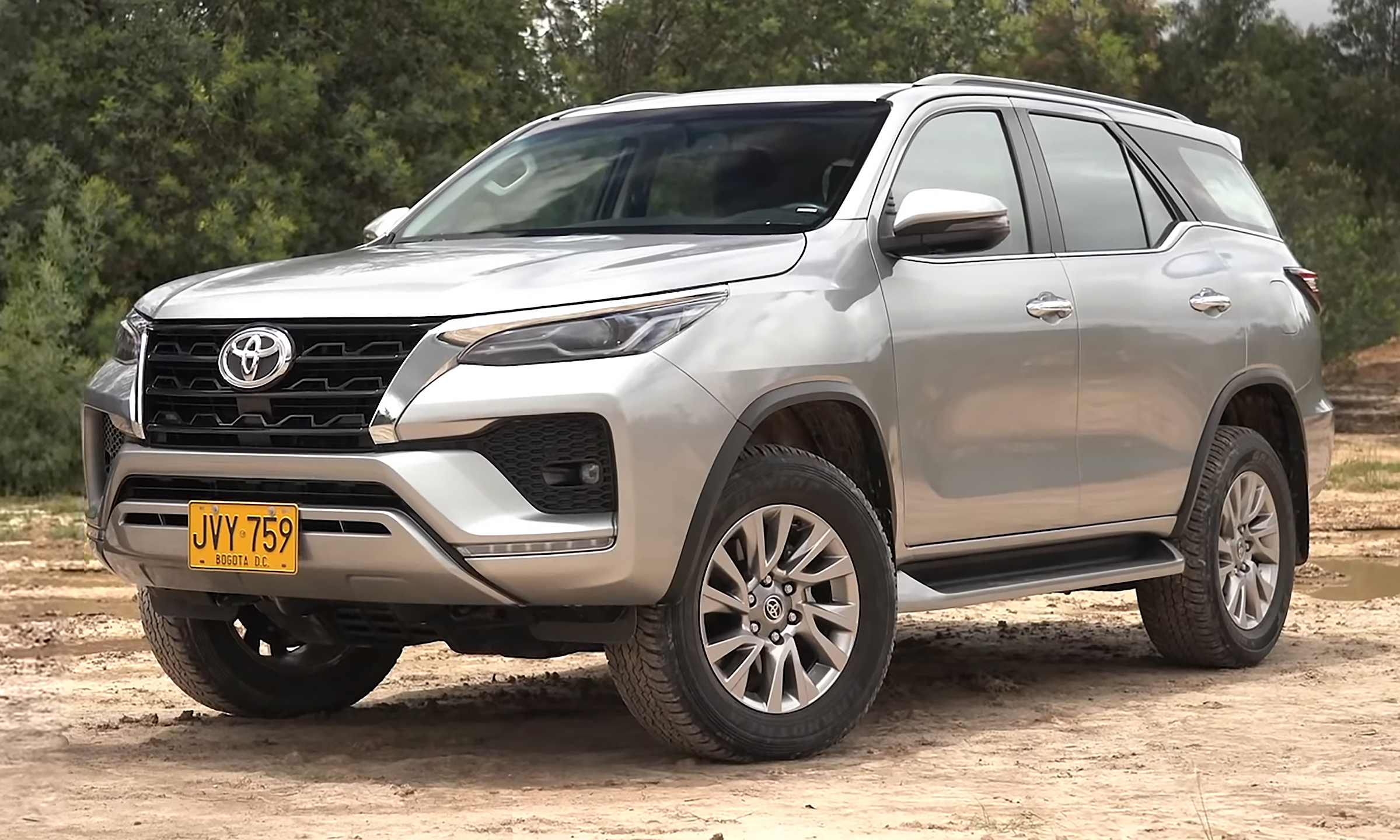
2021 Fortuner 4.0 SRV 4x4 (GGN155; facelift, Colombia)

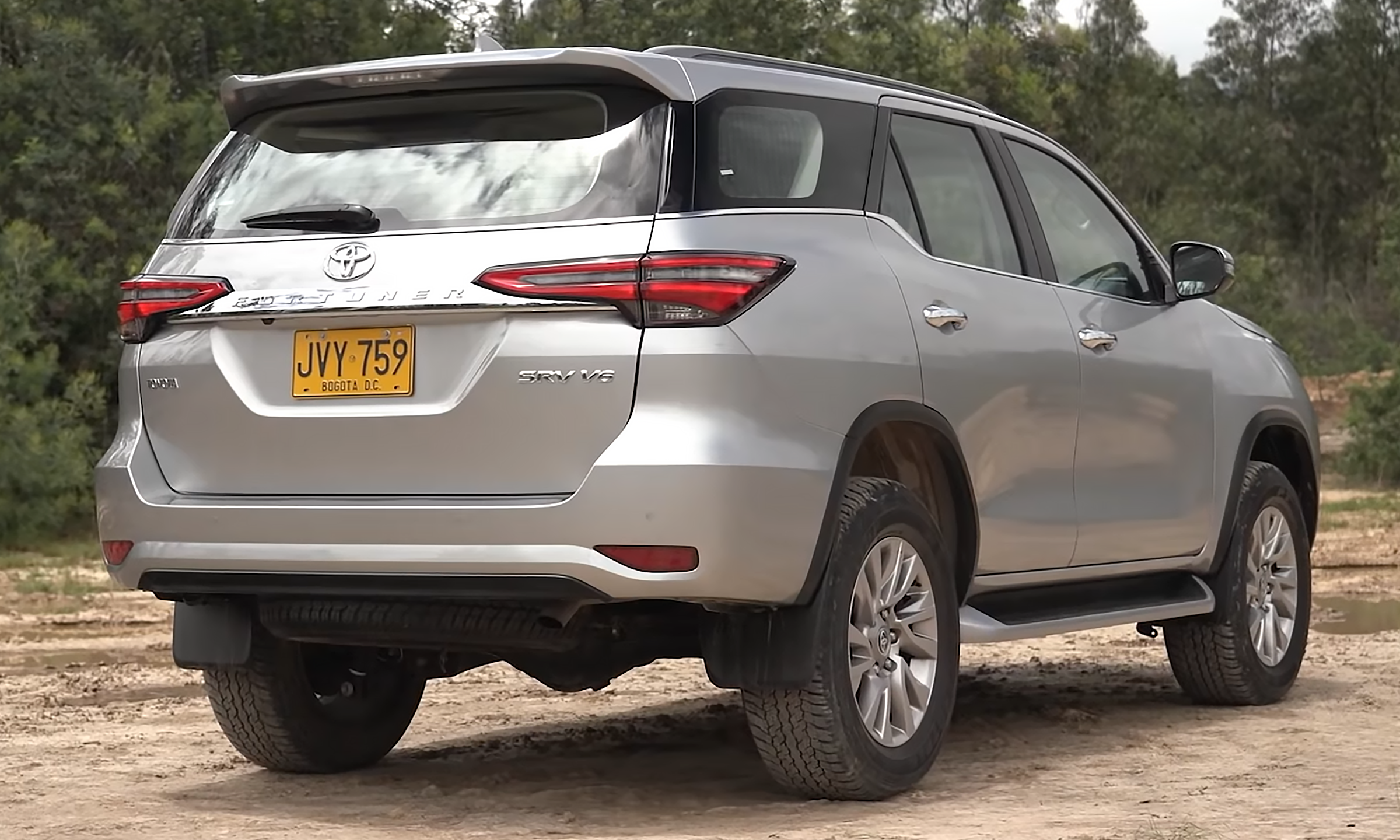
2021 Fortuner 4.0 SRV 4x4 (GGN155; facelift, Colombia)

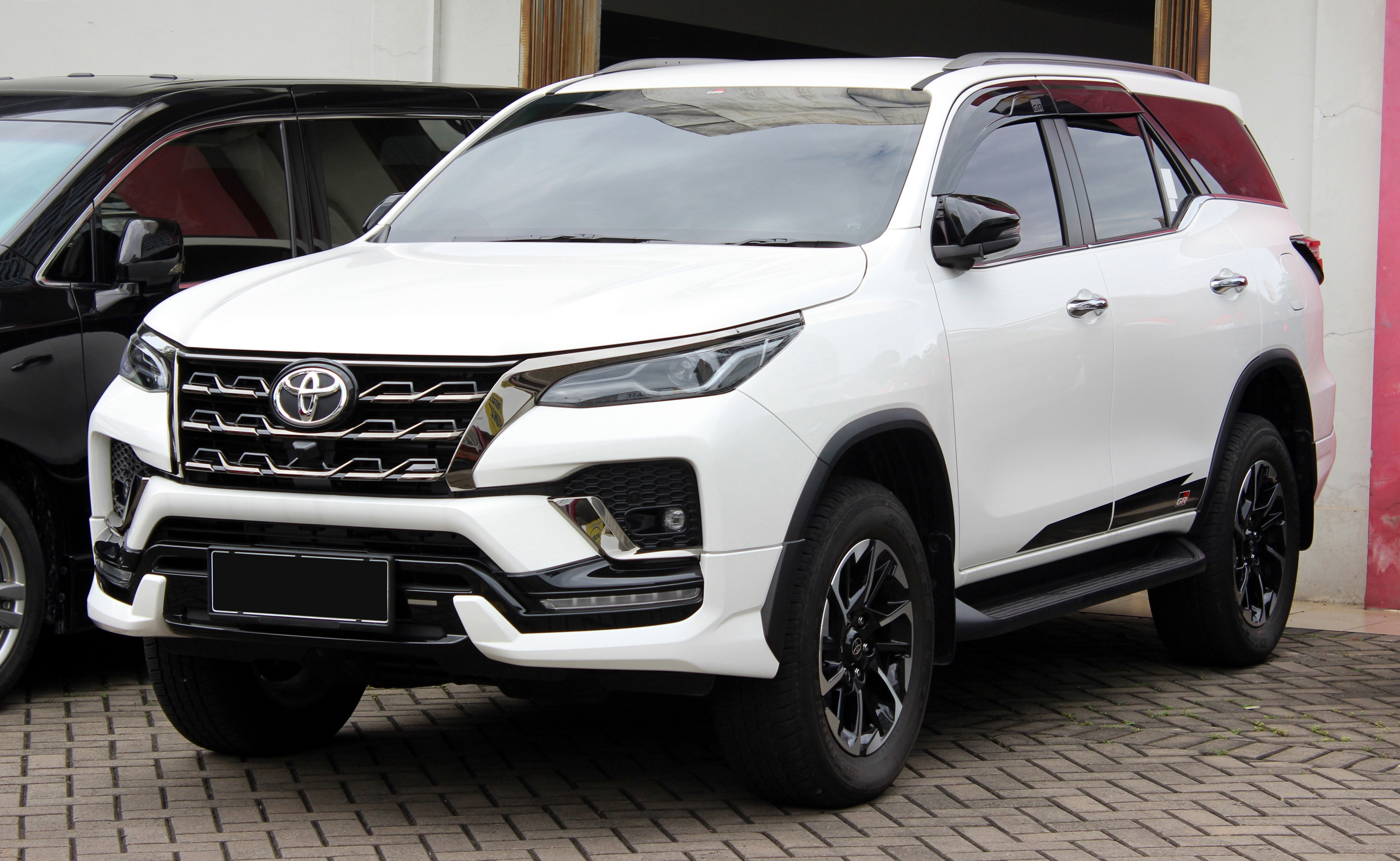
2022 Fortuner 2.8 VRZ GR Sport 4x2 (GUN166; facelift, Indonesia)

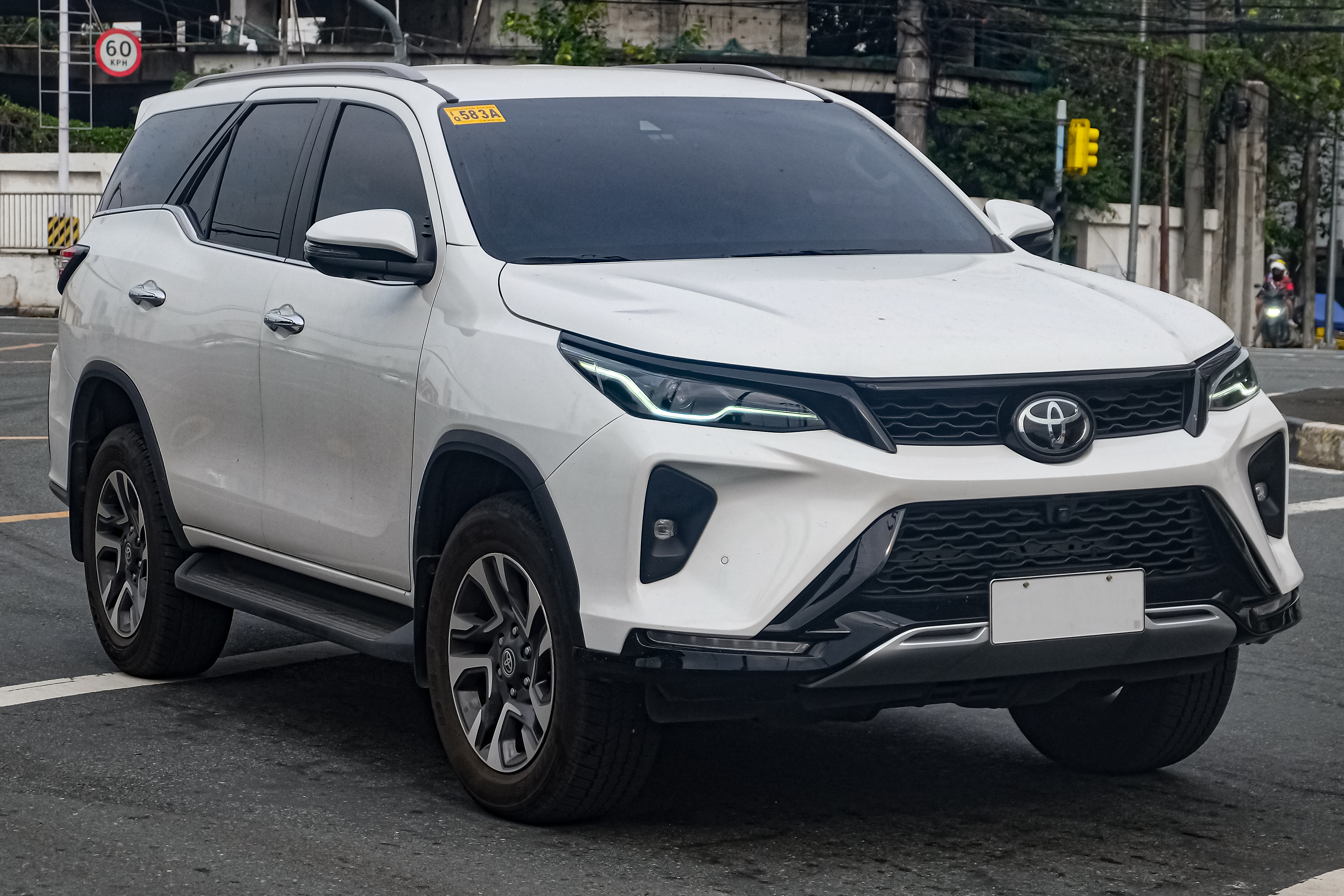
2024 Fortuner 2.8 Q 4x2 (GUN165; facelift, Philippines)

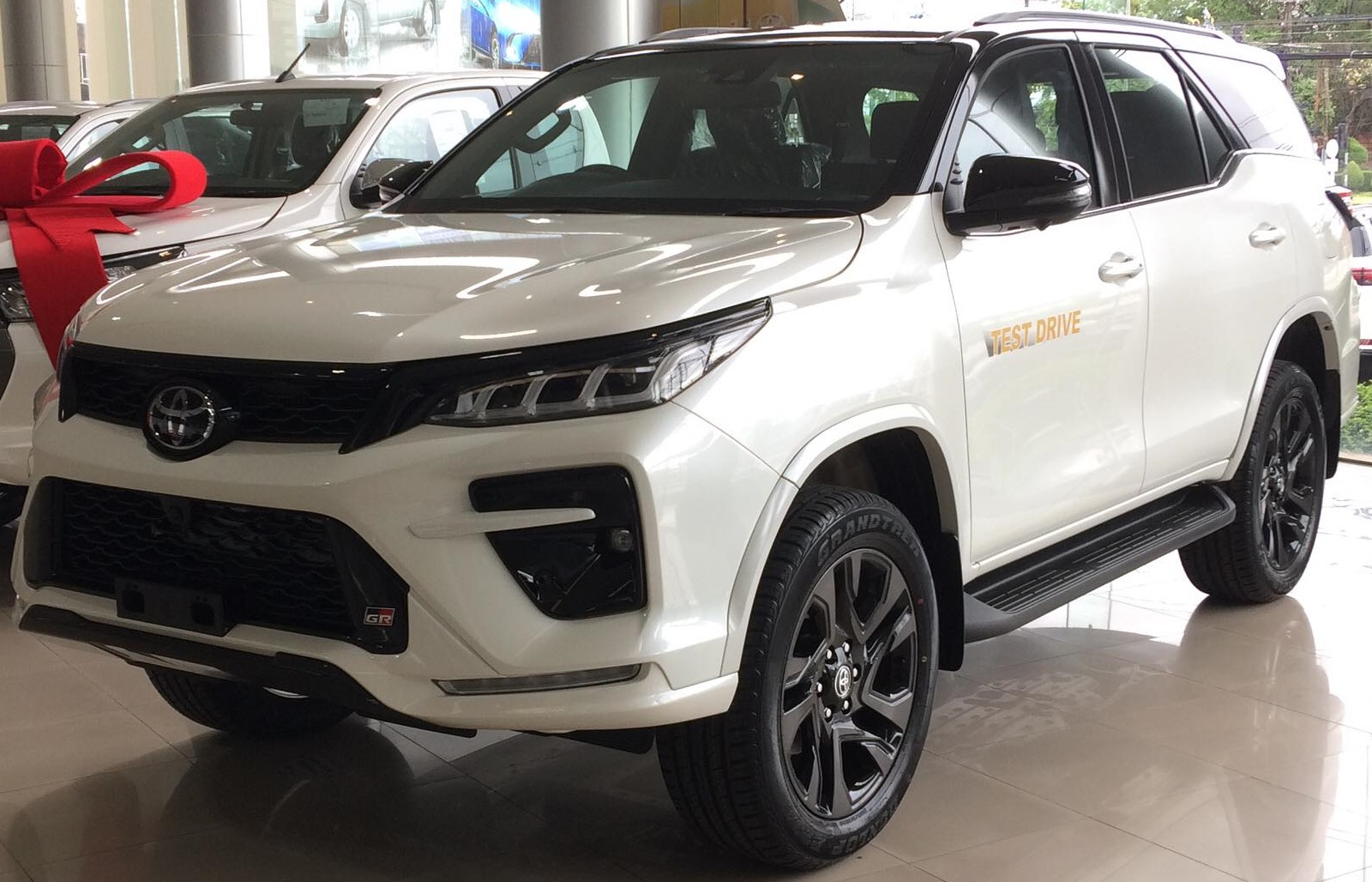
2021 Fortuner 2.8 GR Sport 4WD (GUN156; facelift, Thailand)

=== Safety ===
ANCAP test results* Toyota Fortuner (2015)
Test	Score
Overall	5 /5 stars
Frontal offset	13.45/16
Side impact	16/16
Pole	2/2
Seat belt reminders	2.5/3
Whiplash protection	Good
Pedestrian protection	Good
Electronic stability control	Standard

ANCAP test results* Toyota Fortuner (2019, aligned with Euro NCAP)
Test	Points	%
Overall:	5 /5 stars	
Adult occupant:	36.3	95%
Child occupant:	41.4	84%
Pedestrian:	42.2	88%
Safety assist:	10.1	78%

ASEAN NCAP test results Toyota Fortuner (2020)
Test	Points
Overall:	5 /5 stars
Adult occupant:	47.27
Child occupant:	22.13
Safety assist:	18.06

== Sales ==
Year	Thailand	Philippines	Indonesia	India	Vietnam	Australia	South Africa	Colombia	Brazil	Argentina	Malaysia (Note: Figures based on registration (Malaysia))
2005		4,011	3,134						1,631		1,557
2006		7,468	3,945						6,175		1,833
2007		7,216	4,155						7,067		1,973
2008		5,588	8,945						7,028		1,636
2009		5,839	7,967						5,810		1,786
2010		7,548	10,712						8,098	2,017	1,899
2011		7,774	13,111	7,872					8,197	2,439	1,755
2012		11,617	20,498	15,153					10,397	2,465	2,252
2013		13,106	17,974	17,352					12,354	2,785	2,617
2014	20,156	18,643	18,916	16,991					13,660	848	2,353
2015	31,005	15,768	10,423	15,909					8,670	522	1,615
2016	28,050	28,549	29,252	9,254	11,695		11,060		12,171	3,634	2,715
2017	23,470	39,680	24,531	24,383	13,023		13,696		12,583	3,809	4,416
2018	26,119	23,082	21,459	21,800	6,009		13,099		13,339	4,967	4,446
2019	26,217	19,865	17,208	15,488	13,001	3,033	11,644		13,547	3,080	2,806
2020	19,742	8,494	11,352	9,204	8,512	2,883	9,635		9,129	2,521	1,306
2021	22,278	12,982	24,177	18,945	6,352	3,822	9,236		13,643	4,884	1,673
2022	27,658	16,925	22,823	26,099	7,653	4,614	7,805	3,935	13,700	3,726	3,425
2023	22,088	13,971	16,232	35,066	3,492	3,619	10,384	3,797	16,011	6,090	2,869
2024	13,014	12,408	12,947	33,597	3,511	3,042	10,666	3,568	17,807	5,665	3,323
2025		13,089	13,219	34,716			9,049		17,077		2,171

== See also ==
- List of Toyota vehicles
