= Toyota Tamaraw =

Toyota Tamaraw may refer to:

- Toyota Tamaraw (1976–2005), the Philippine model of Toyota Kijang
- Toyota Tamaraw (2023–present), the Philippine model of Toyota Hilux Champ
