= Toyota IMV platform =

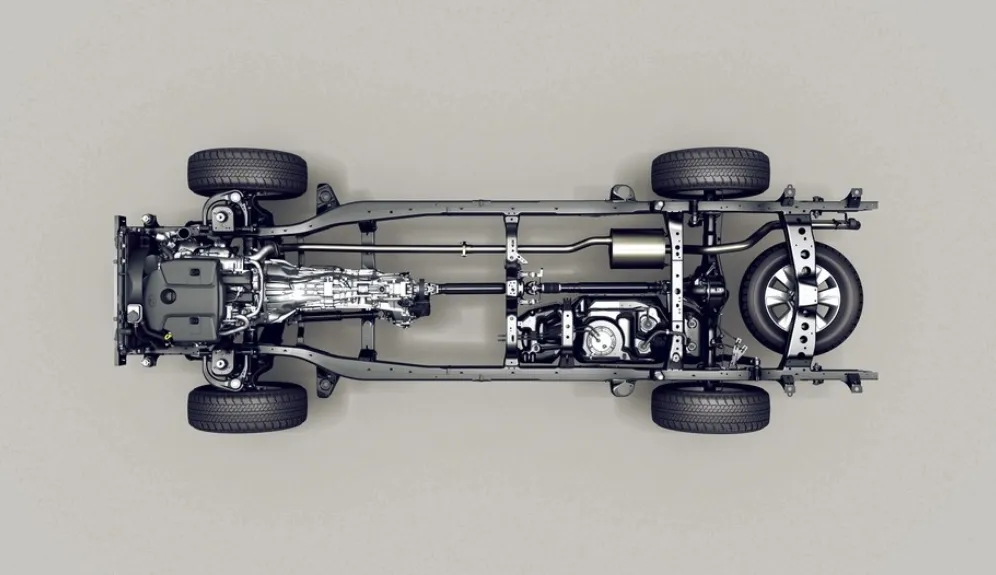
- IMV frame for Toyota Hilux (AN130)

Overview
- Manufacturer: Toyota
- Also called: Toyota Global Quality (GQ) Project; F3
- Production: 2004–present

Body and chassis
- Layout: Front-engine, rear-wheel-drive; Front-engine, four-wheel-drive
- Body styles: 2/4-door pickup truck; 5-door SUV; 5-door minivan
- Vehicles: Toyota Hilux (pickup truck, seventh generation onwards); Toyota Fortuner, Toyota Land Cruiser FJ (SUV); Toyota Innova (minivan)

Powertrain
- Engines: Petrol: Toyota TR engine; Toyota GR engine; Diesel: Toyota L engine; Toyota KD engine; Toyota GD engine

Dimensions
- Wheelbase: 2,580–2,750 mm (101.6–108.3 in) (wagon); 2,580–3,085 mm (101.6–121.5 in) (pickup truck)

The Toyota IMV platform is an automobile platform for SUVs, pickups/light trucks and passenger cars from Toyota. The name "IMV" stands for "Innovative International Multi-purpose Vehicle". It uses a ladder frame chassis construction.

IMV platform-based vehicles are either rear-wheel drive or four-wheel drive (can be either full-time or rear-based part-time). The front suspension is independent double-wishbone, while the rear suspension is half-dependent. Engines are mounted longitudinally.

== History ==
The IMV Project was first announced by Toyota in 2002. The project aimed to develop and produce pickup trucks, a minivan and an SUV outside Japan to reduce costs. The vehicles were released in 2004 as the seventh-generation Hilux, first-generation Innova and first-generation Fortuner respectively.

Initial production of IMV vehicles was centered in Thailand, Indonesia, Argentina and South Africa, which would supply vehicles to countries in Asia, Europe, Africa, Oceania, Latin America and the Middle East in a complete form or by knock-down kits. The production of major components was divided, for example diesel engine production was centered in Thailand, petrol engines in Indonesia and manual transmissions in the Philippines and India.

Cumulative sales reached 1 million vehicles in 2006, 2 million in 2008, 3 million in 2009, 4 million in 2010, and 5 million in March 2012.

== Applications ==
- Toyota Hilux
  - AN10/AN20/AN30 (2004–2015, also referred to as "IMV1"/"IMV2"/"IMV3")
  - AN120/AN130 (2015–present)
  - AN220/AN230 (2025–present)
- Toyota Fortuner / SW4 / Hilux SW4
  - AN50/AN60 (2005–2015, also referred to as "IMV4")
  - AN150/AN160 (2015–present)
- Toyota Innova
  - AN40 (2004–2015, also referred to as "IMV5")
  - AN140 (2015–present)
- Toyota Hilux Champ/Rangga/Tamaraw/Stout
  - AN110/AN120 (2023–present)
- Toyota Land Cruiser FJ
  - J240 (2026–present)
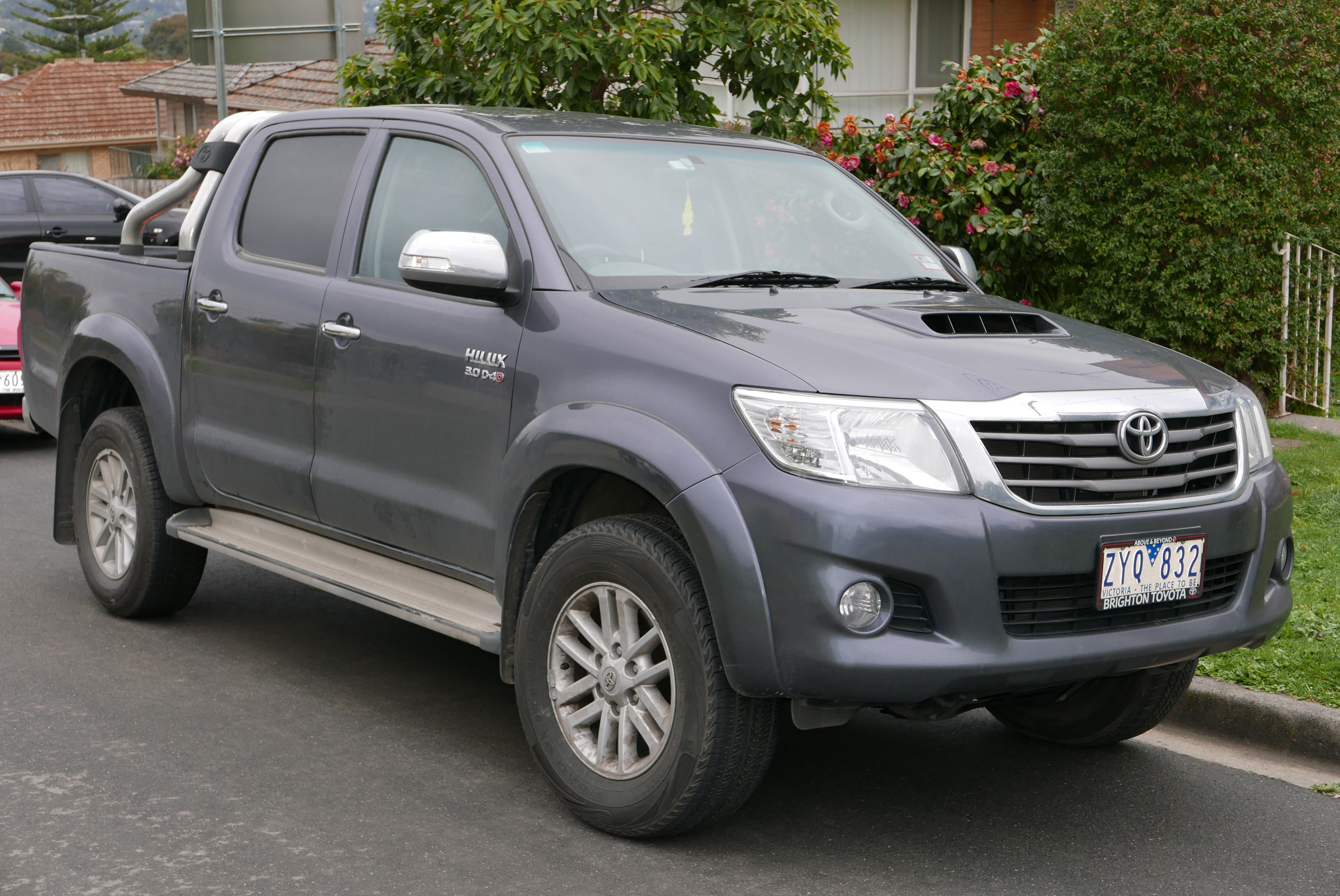
Toyota Hilux (AN10)

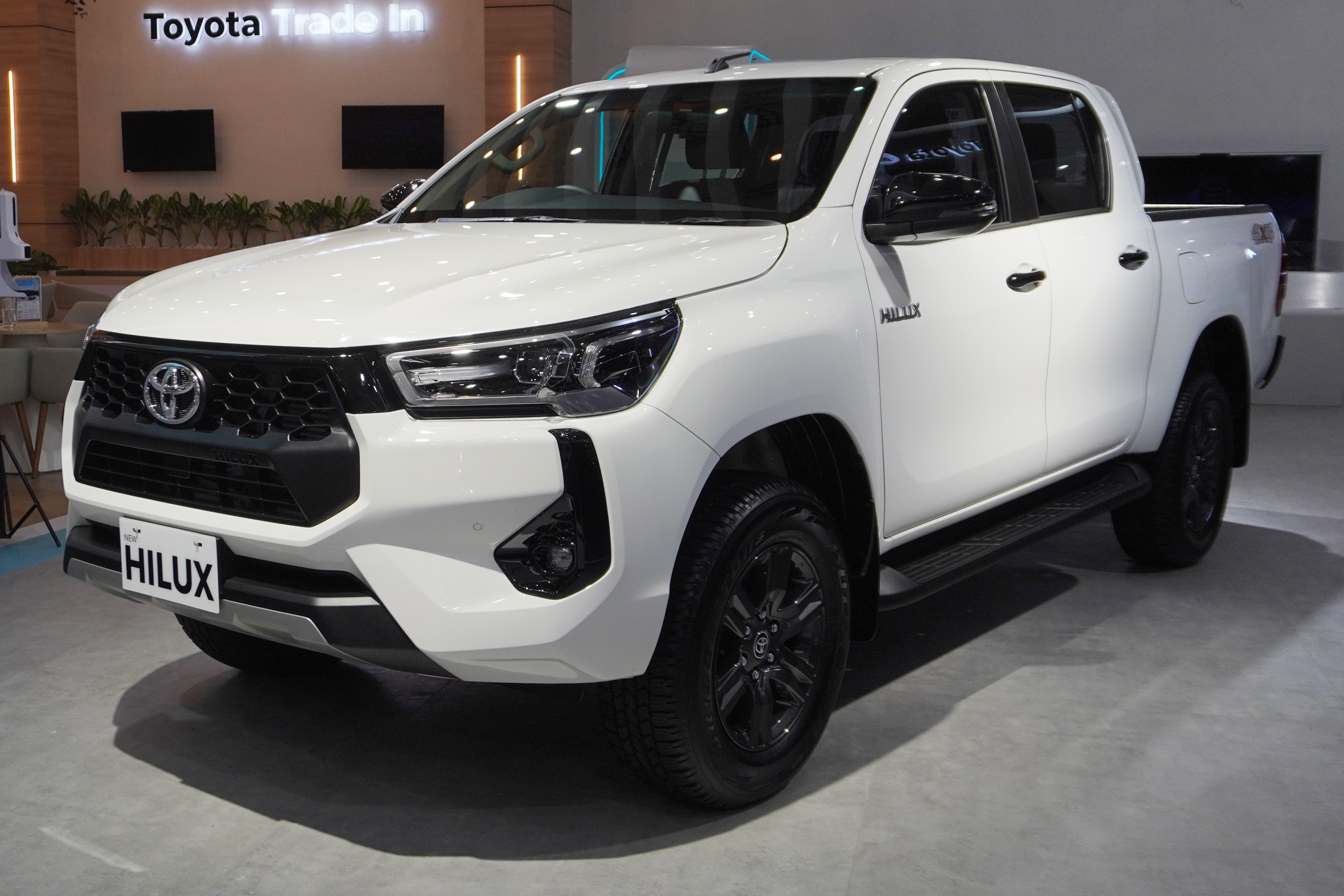
Toyota Hilux (AN120)

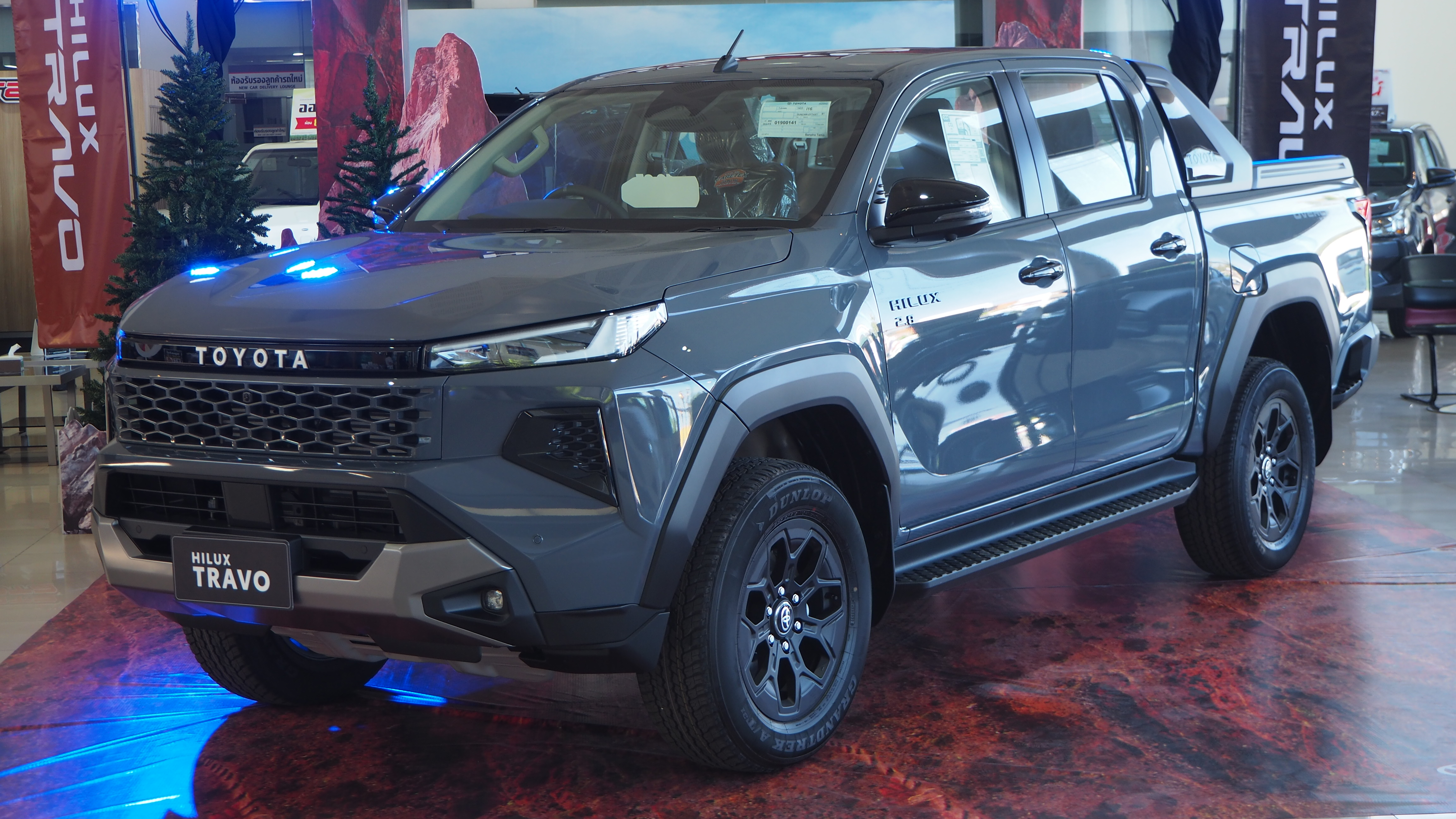
Toyota Hilux (AN220)

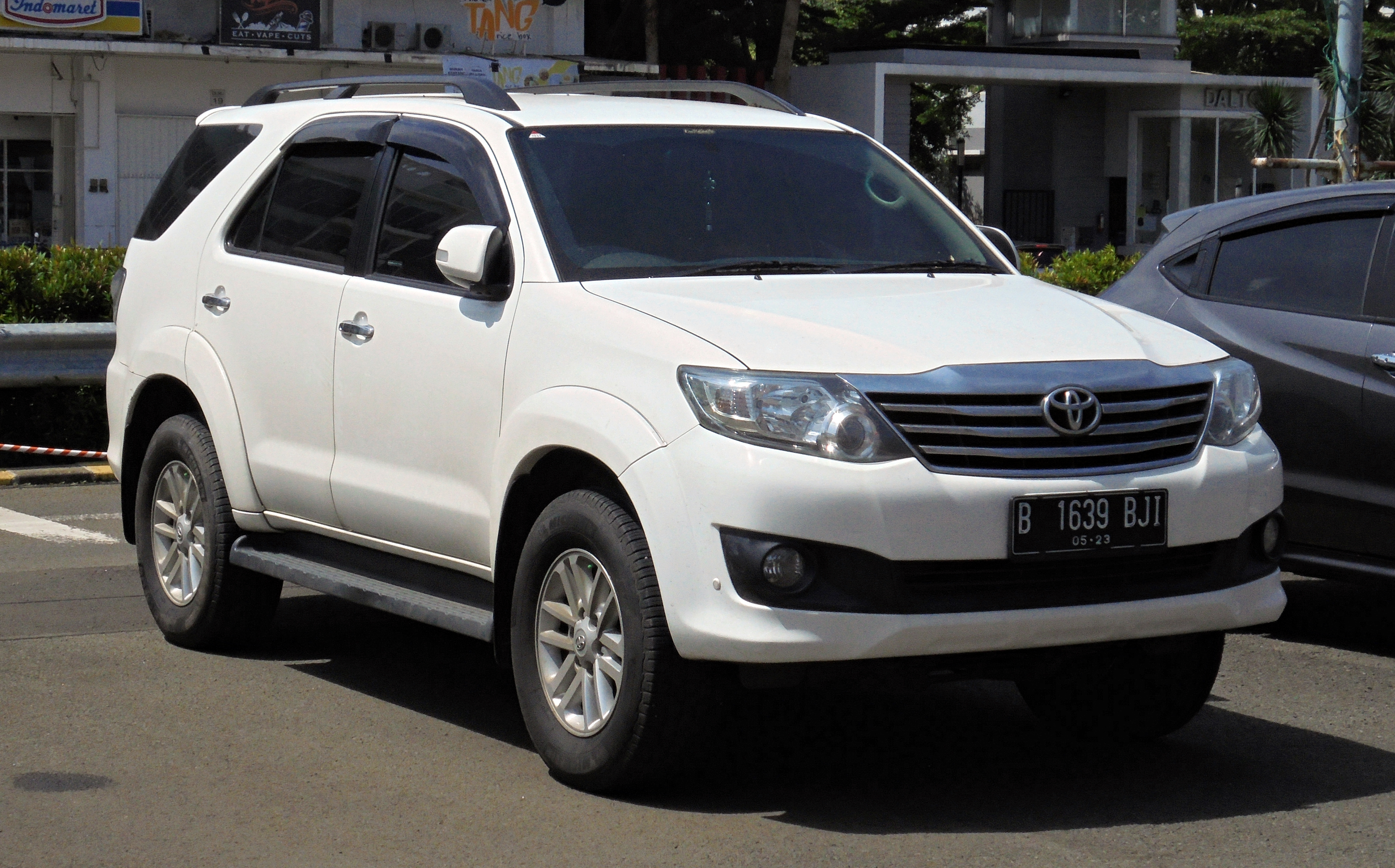
Toyota Fortuner (AN50)

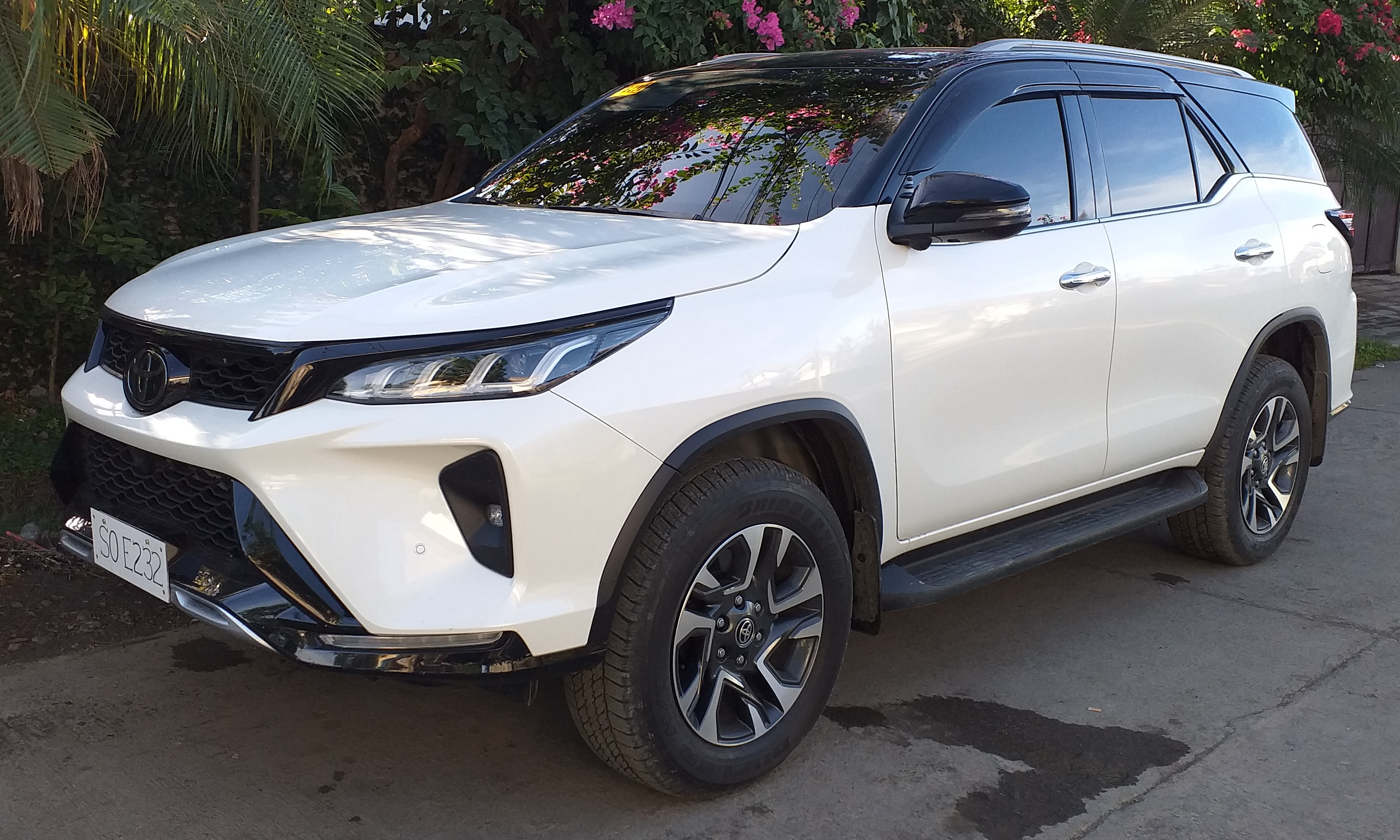
Toyota Fortuner (AN150)

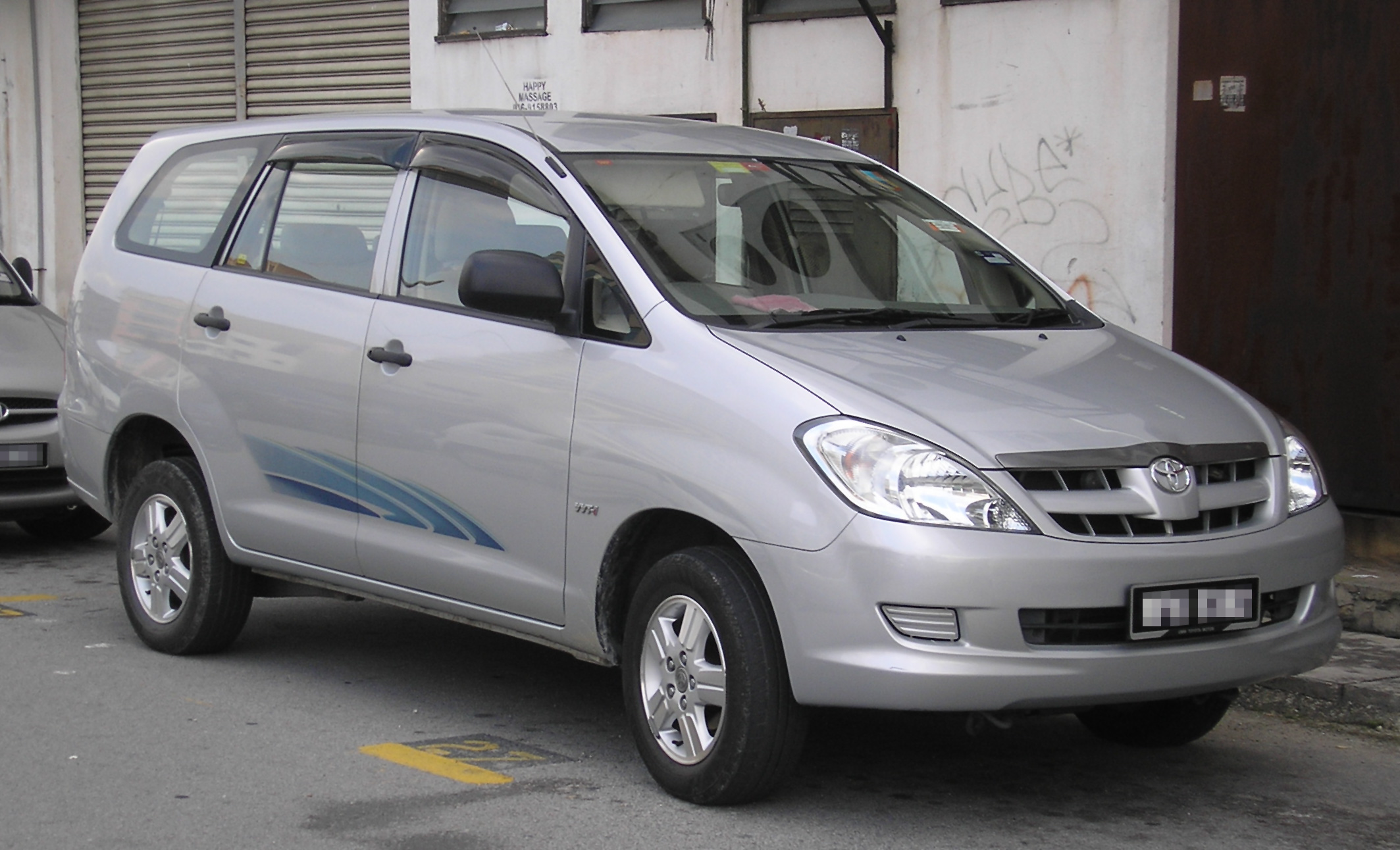
Toyota Innova (AN40)

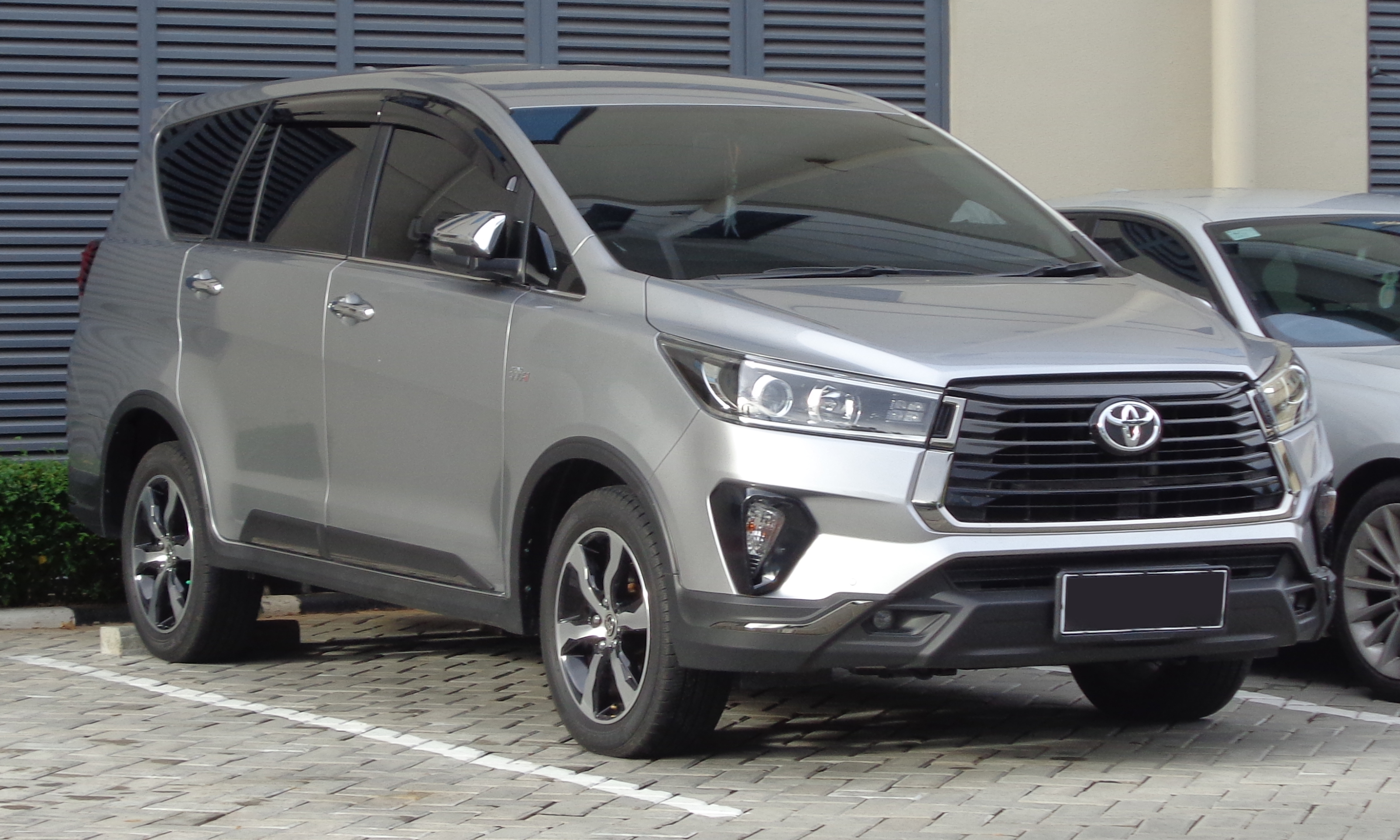
Toyota Innova (AN140)

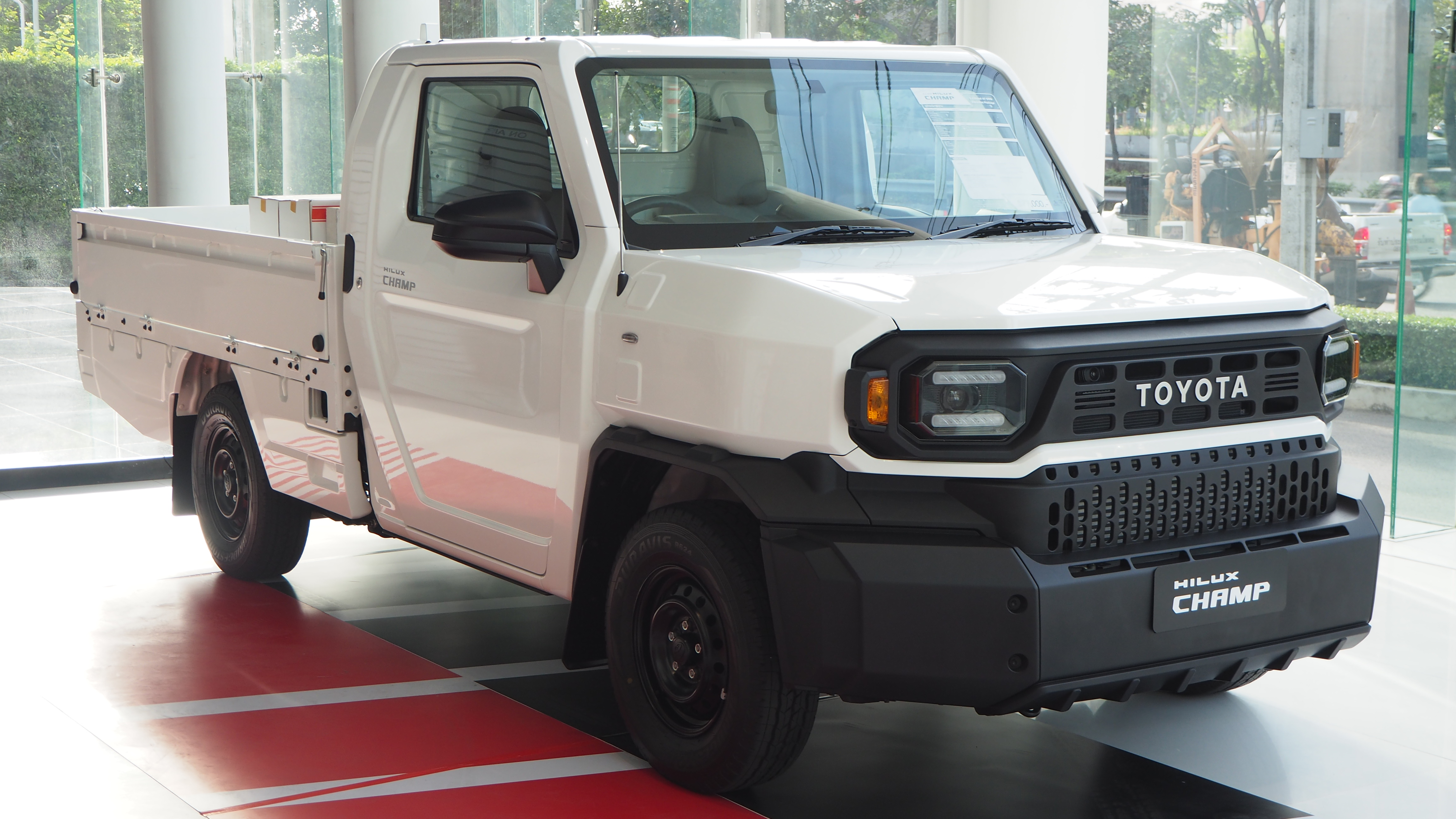
Toyota Hilux Champ

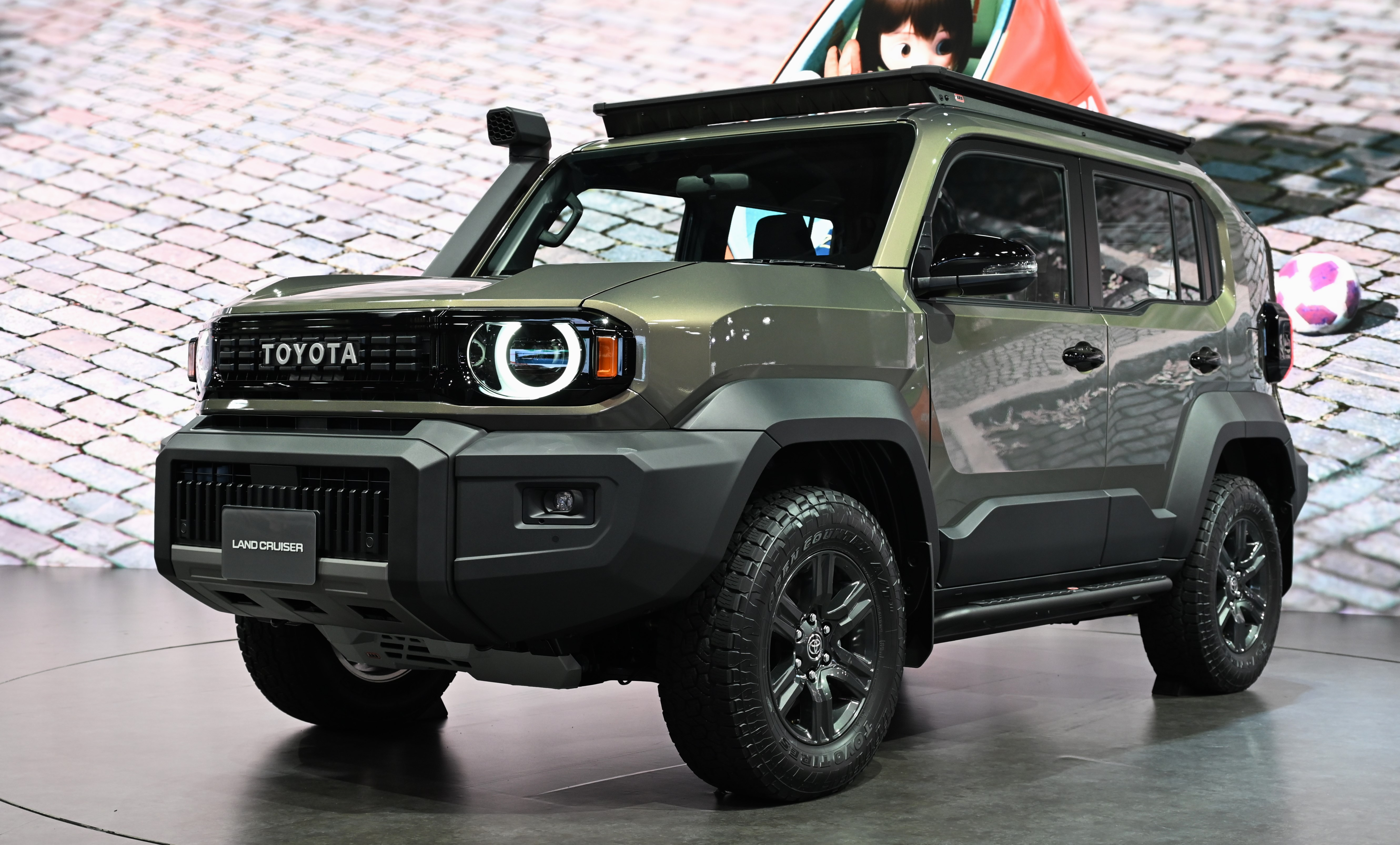
Toyota Land Cruiser FJ (J240)
