= Toyota Rangga =

The Toyota Rangga may refer to:

- Toyota Kijang Rangga, a variant of the Toyota Kijang (F70) wagon produced between 1997 and 2000
- Toyota Hilux Rangga, the Indonesian version of the Toyota Hilux Champ
  - Toyota Rangga Concept, the Indonesian version of the Toyota IMV 0 Concept pickup truck showcased in 2023
