= Toyota Land Cruiser FJ =

Compact SUV from Toyota

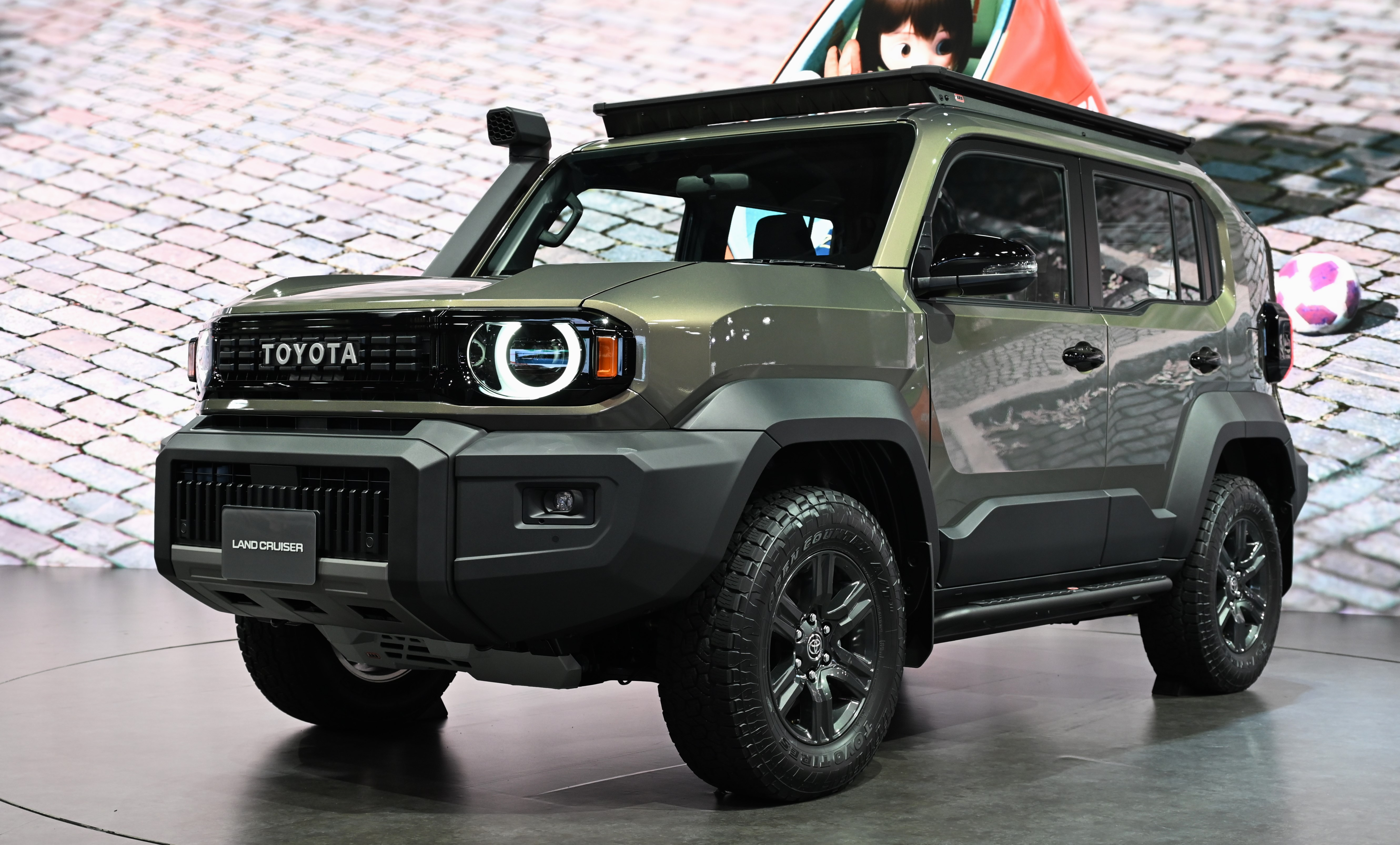
- Toyota Land Cruiser FJ prototype

Overview
- Manufacturer: Toyota
- Model code: J240
- Production: February 2026 – present
- Assembly: Thailand: Ban Pho (TMT)
- Designer: Koji Inoue (project chief designer); Lu Yi, Kosuke Kubo and Kohei Toyoda (exterior); Yuki Ujita (interior)

Body and chassis
- Class: Compact SUV
- Body style: 5-door SUV
- Layout: Front-engine, part-time four-wheel-drive
- Platform: IMV platform
- Chassis: Body-on-frame
- Related: Toyota Hilux Champ; Toyota Hilux (AN110/AN120/AN130); Toyota Hilux (AN220/AN230); Toyota Fortuner (AN150/AN160)

Powertrain
- Engine: Petrol: 2.7 L 2TR-FE I4 (TRJ240)
- Power output: 120 kW (161 hp; 163 PS)
- Transmission: 6-speed automatic

Dimensions
- Wheelbase: 2,580 mm (101.6 in)
- Length: 4,575–4,610 mm (180.1–181.5 in)
- Width: 1,855 mm (73.0 in)
- Height: 1,960 mm (77.2 in)
- Kerb weight: 1,960 kg (4,321 lb)

Chronology
- Predecessor: Toyota Land Cruiser Prado 3-door; Toyota FJ Cruiser

The Toyota Land Cruiser FJ (Japanese: トヨタ・ランドクルーザーFJ, Hepburn: Toyota Rando-Kurūzā Efujē) (model code J240) is a retro-styled compact SUV produced by Japanese manufacturer Toyota since 2026. It is part of the Land Cruiser range as the smallest variation in the lineup. The name "FJ" is a backronym of "Freedom & Joy" and is a reference to the FJ40 Land Cruiser.

== Overview ==
In August 2023, the Land Cruiser FJ was first shown in teaser images alongside the Toyota Land Cruiser Se Concept and Toyota Land Hopper three-wheeled scooter.

The Land Cruiser FJ made its first autoshow debut at the 2025 Japan Mobility Show on 20 October 2025. It is built upon the IMV platform shared with the Hilux. The model will be available in Asian, African, Middle East and Latin American markets, with no plans for availability in the North America or Europe. Before its introduction, the design of the Land Cruiser FJ was previewed by the Compact Cruiser EV concept SUV in December 2021.

It is powered by a 2.7-litre 2TR-FE four-cylinder engine with 120 kW (161 hp; 163 PS) and 246 N⋅m (181 lb⋅ft) of torque mated to a 6-speed automatic transmission and four-wheel drive as the sole powertrain option. The suspension uses an independent double wishbone setup for the front and a five-link coil-sprung setup for the rear with live/solid axle.

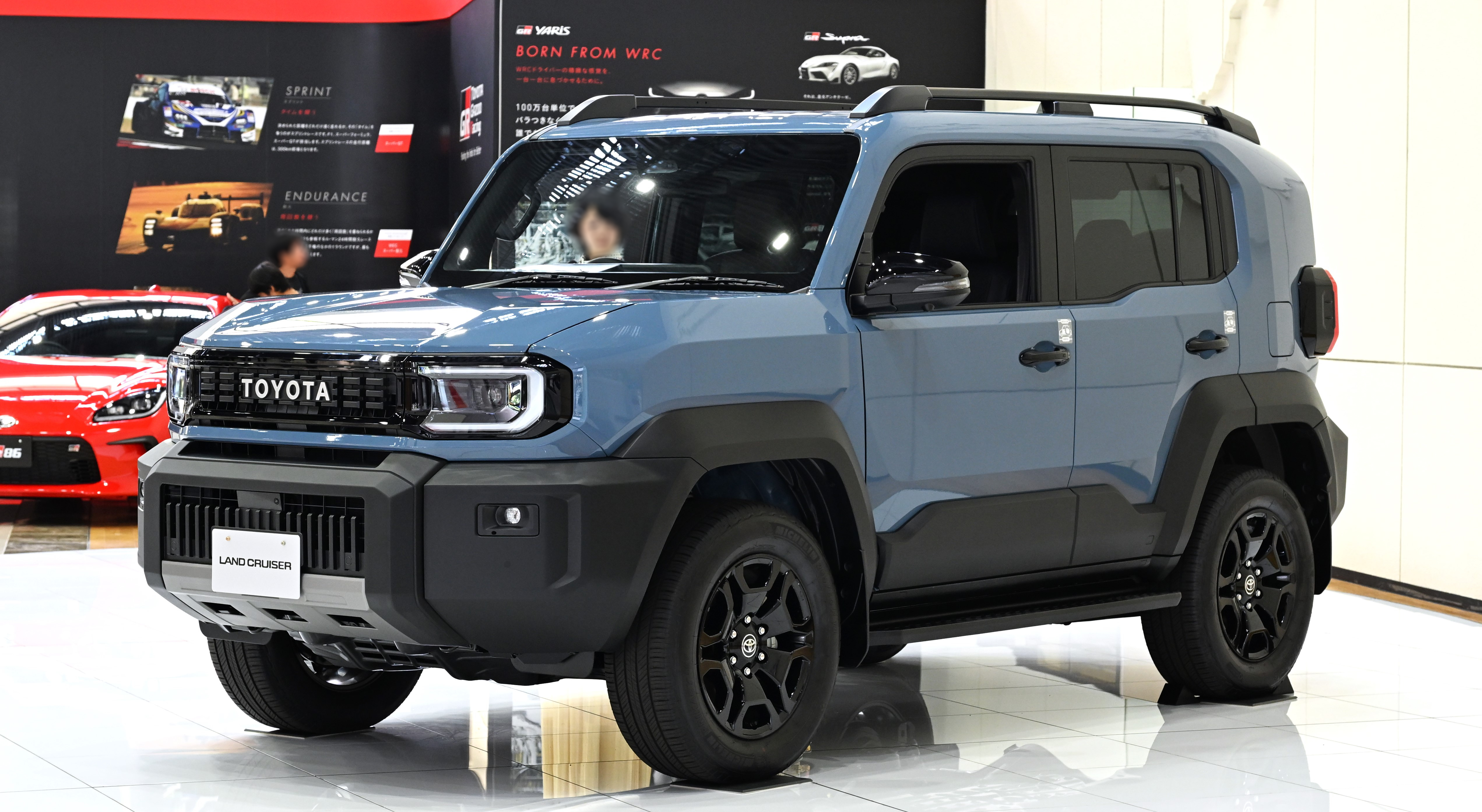
2026 Land Cruiser FJ VX

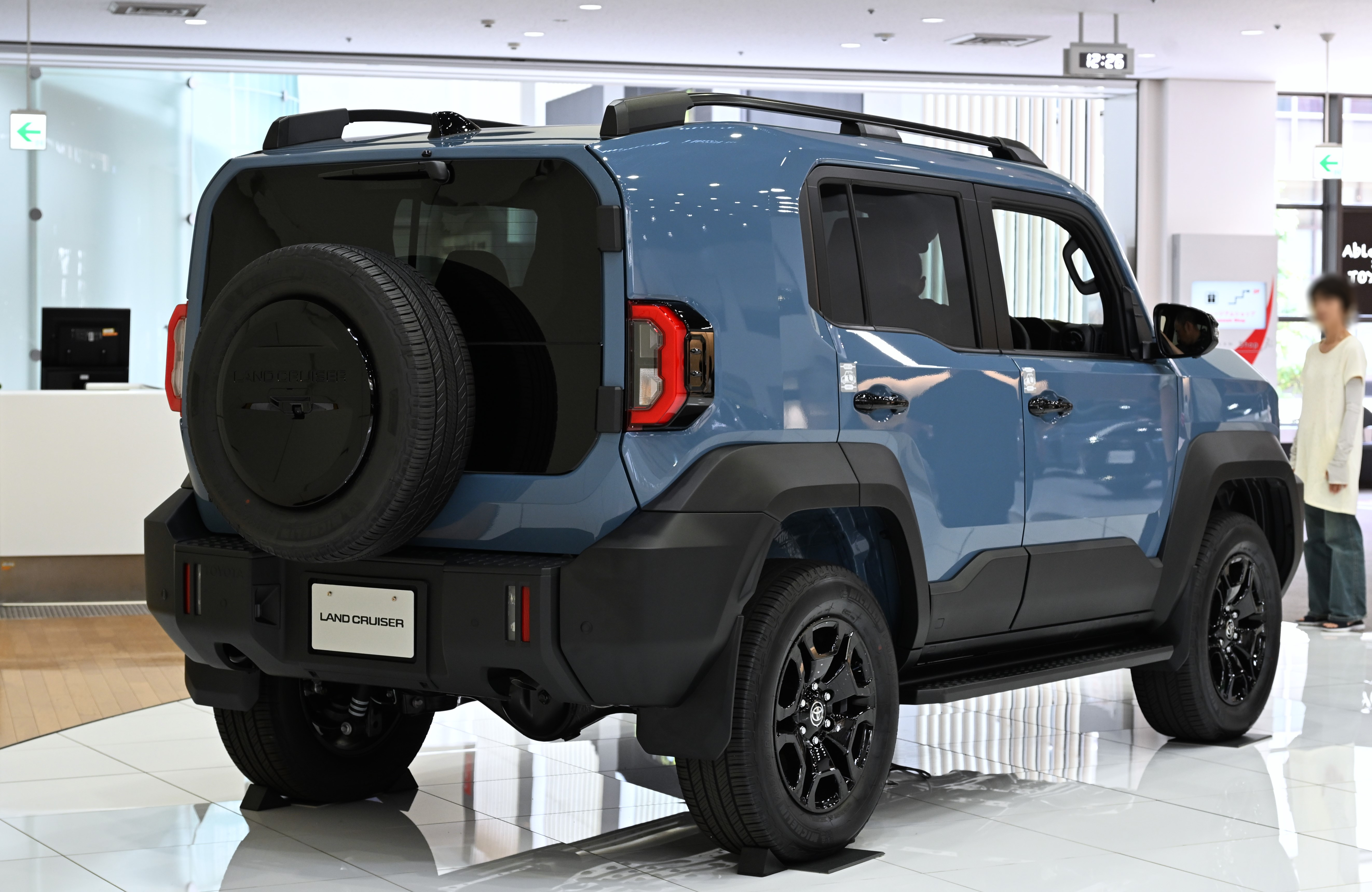
Rear view

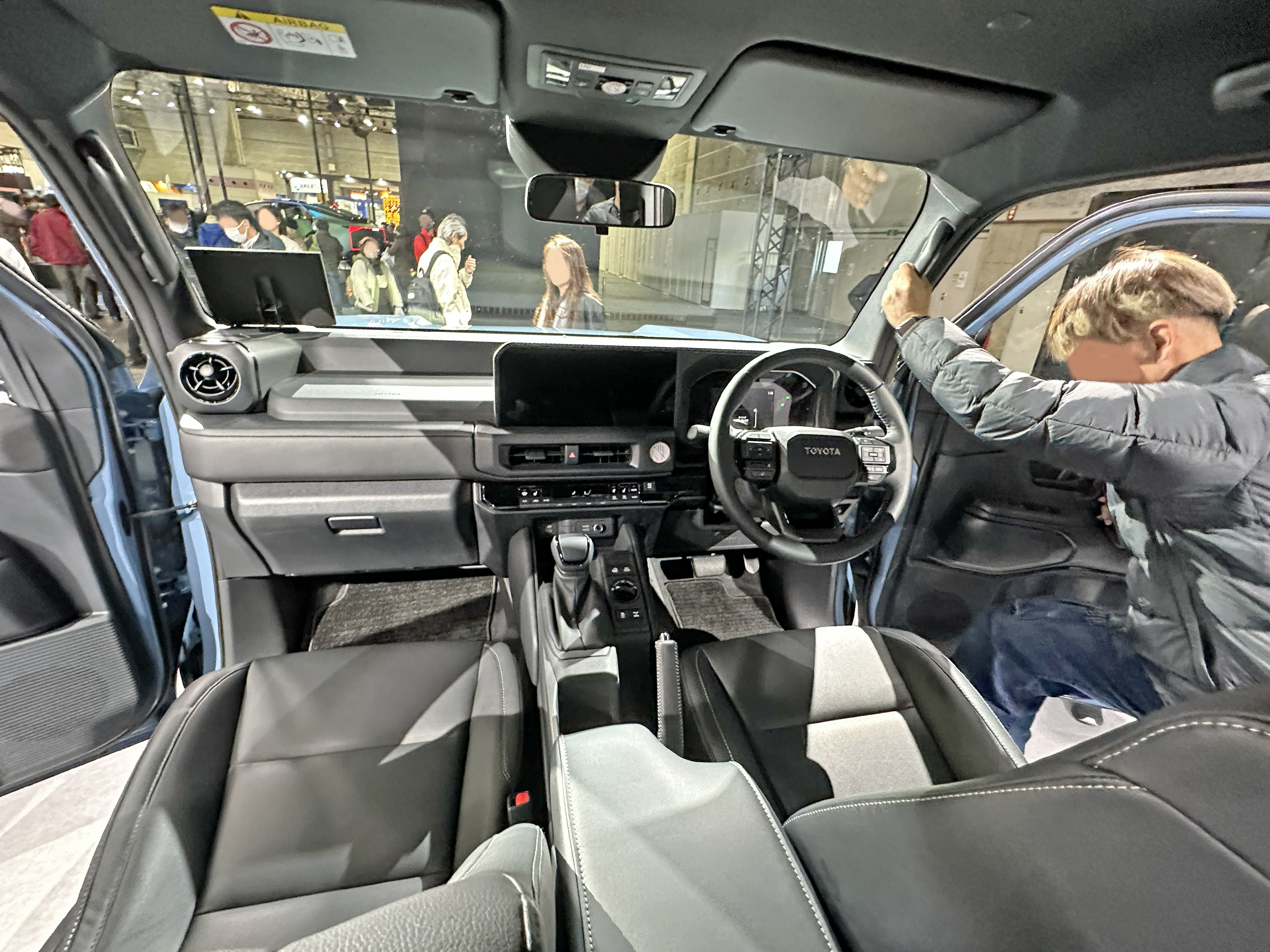
Interior

== Markets ==
=== Africa ===
==== South Africa ====
The Land Cruiser FJ was launched on 10 May 2026 for the South African market. It is available in GX and VX grades.

=== Asia ===
==== Japan ====
The Land Cruiser FJ was launched on 14 May 2026 for the Japanese market. It is available in a single VX grade.

==== Indonesia ====
The Land Cruiser FJ was previewed on 29 July 2026 for the Indonesian market at the 33rd Gaikindo Indonesia International Auto Show, alongside the Land Cruiser 300 HEV and bZ4X Touring. Grades available are a base grade and the higher Adventure grade. Sales commenced on 20 November 2026 at the 5th Gaikindo Jakarta Auto Week.

==== Philippines ====
The Land Cruiser FJ was launched on 4 June 2026 for the Philippine market at the 2026 Philippine International Motor Show. It is available in TX and VX grades.

Sales commenced on 20 July 2026.

==== Thailand ====
The Land Cruiser FJ was launched on 21 March 2026 for the Thai market. It is available in a single unnamed grade. For the Thai market, the Land Cruiser FJ is positioned below the Fortuner.

==== Vietnam ====
The Land Cruiser FJ was launched on 28 July 2026 for the Vietnamese market. It is available in a single unnamed grade.

=== Middle East ===
The Land Cruiser FJ arrived in the Middle Eastern markets on 9 September 2026.
