= Toyota RZ engine =

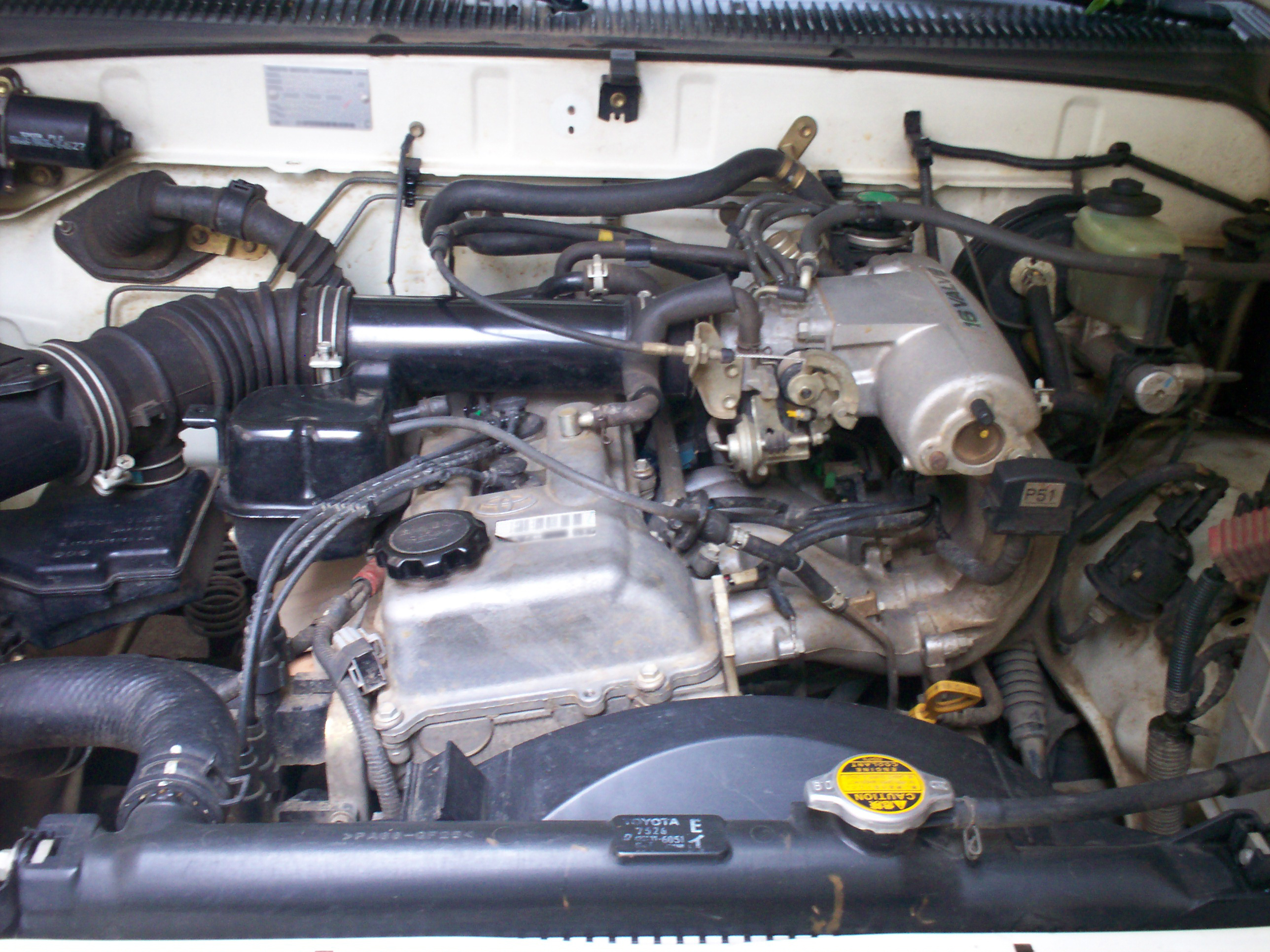
- Toyota 2RZ-FE in a Hilux

Overview
- Manufacturer: Toyota Motor Corporation
- Production: 1989–2004

Layout
- Configuration: Naturally aspirated Straight-4
- Cylinder bore: 86 mm (3.39 in); 95 mm (3.74 in)
- Piston stroke: 86 mm (3.39 in); 95 mm (3.74 in)
- Cylinder block material: Cast iron
- Cylinder head material: Aluminum

RPM range
- Max. engine speed: 5,500

Combustion
- Fuel system: Electronic fuel injection
- Fuel type: Gasoline
- Cooling system: Water-cooled

Output
- Power output: 101–150 hp (75–112 kW; 102–152 PS)
- Torque output: 118–177 lb⋅ft (160–240 N⋅m)

Chronology
- Predecessor: Toyota K engine; Toyota Y engine; Toyota R engine
- Successor: Toyota TR engine

The Toyota RZ engine family is a straight-four piston engine series built in Japan. The RZ series uses a cast-iron engine block and aluminum SOHC or DOHC cylinder heads. It has electronic fuel injection (EFI), 2 or 4 valves per cylinder and features forged steel connecting rods.

== 1RZ ==
The 1RZ is a 2.0 L (1,998 cc) version built from 1989. Bore and stroke is 86 mm × 86 mm (3.39 in × 3.39 in). The original carburetted model in Japanese trim produces 100 PS (74 kW; 99 hp) at 5,400 rpm and maximum torque of 162 N⋅m (119 lb⋅ft) at 2,400 rpm.

Applications:

- 1989–1993 Toyota HiAce

=== 1RZ-E ===
The 1RZ-E is the fuel-injected version of the 1RZ. With a compression ratio of 9.0:1 and in Japanese trim, output is 110 PS (81 kW; 108 hp) at 5,200 rpm and maximum torque of 167 N⋅m (123 lb⋅ft) at 2,600 rpm. With redline at 5,500 rpm.

Applications:

- 1989–2004 Toyota HiAce Van, Wagon
- 1998–2001 Toyota Hilux
- 2000–2004 Toyota Kijang/Revo/Venture

== 2RZ ==
The 2RZ is a 2.4 L (2,438 cc) version. Bore and stroke is 95 mm × 86 mm (3.74 in × 3.39 in); a variety of combination of heads and fuel delivery systems were available.

=== 2RZ-E ===
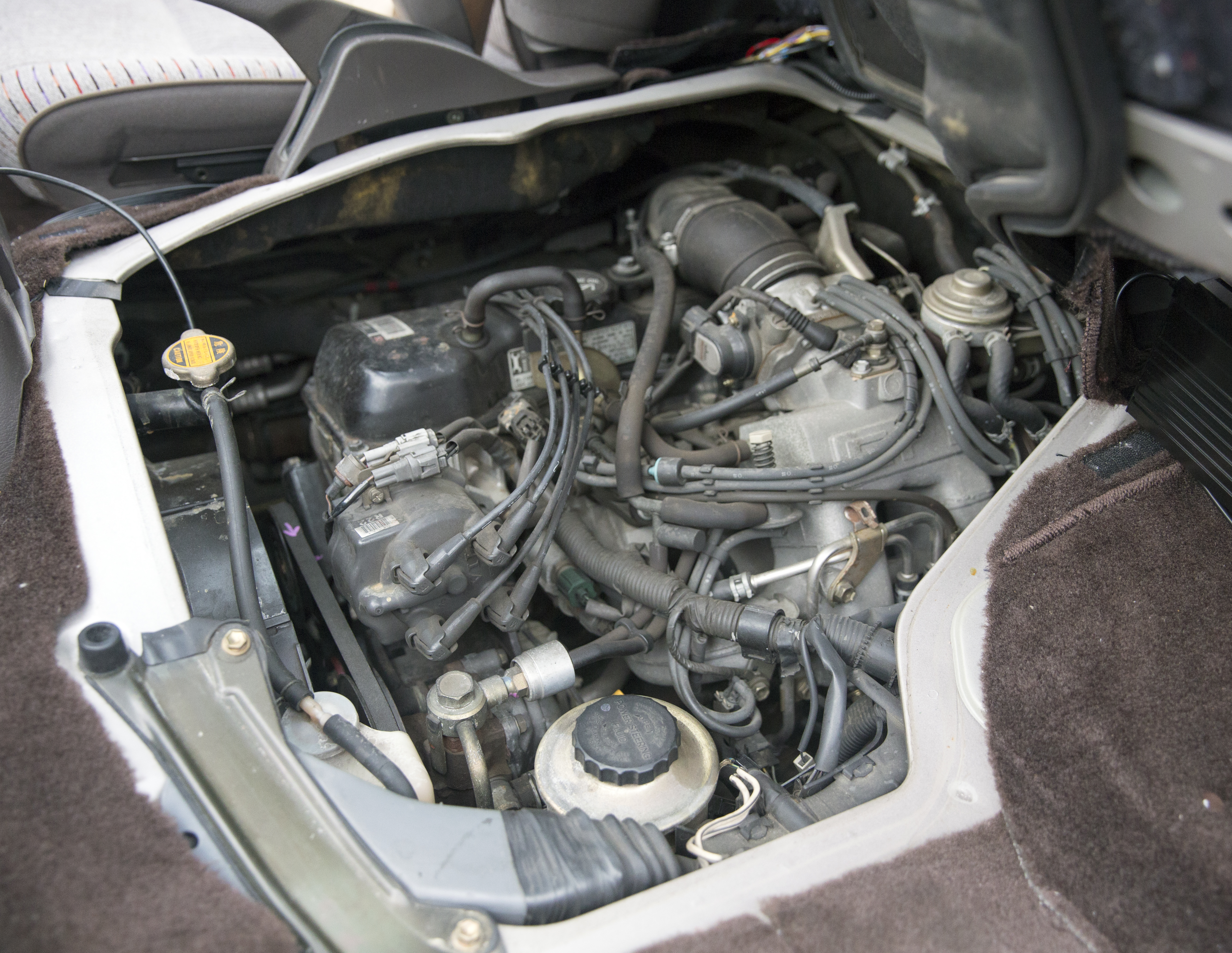
2RZ-E Engine in a 1994 Toyota HiAce (RZH101G)

This is an SOHC engine with two valves per cylinder. Valve adjustment is by shim over bucket. Output is 120 PS (88 kW; 118 hp) at 4800 rpm with 146 lb⋅ft (198N⋅m) of torque at 2600 rpm. It does not have balance shafts and is known for vibrations. Originally manufactured with a carburetor induction system, it was later upgraded to Electronic Fuel Injection, with the -E suffix added to the engine designation. Toyota specified unleaded fuel with a rating of at least 91 RON in Australia.

Applications:

- 1989–2004 Toyota HiAce (encompassing the RZH1xx series)

=== 2RZ-FE ===
The 2RZ-FE, and 4RB1 or 4RB2 in China, is a 2.4 L (2,438 cc) version. Bore and stroke is 95 mm × 86 mm (3.74 in × 3.39 in). Compression ratio is 9.5:1. Output is 142 hp (106 kW; 144 PS) at 5000 rpm with 160 lb⋅ft (217 N⋅m) of torque at 4000 rpm. This engine does not feature balance shafts. It has four valves per cylinder and DOHC. Valve adjustment is by shim over bucket. The 2RZ-FE is an interference engine with a timing chain. A 2.2 L (2,185 cc) version called the 4RB3 is also manufactured in China which has a bore and stroke of 91 mm × 84 mm (3.58 in × 3.31 in), while sharing the 2RZ's 102.5 mm (4.04 in) bore spacing. According to a review in 2023, there are reports of the engine typically lasting over 250,000-300,000 miles and less frequently 500,000 miles.

Applications:

- 1995–2004 Toyota Tacoma 4x2
- 1998–2004 Toyota Hilux
- 1999–2006 ARO 24 Series (Romania)

== 3RZ ==
=== 3RZ-F ===
The 3RZ-F is a carbureted version of the 3RZ engine, produced for G.C.C. and General Markets where mechanical simplicity was prioritized over electronic fuel injection.

It shares the same 2,693 cc displacement, 95 mm bore, and 95 mm stroke as the 3RZ-FE. Performance is approximately 143 PS (105 kW) at 4,800 rpm and 226 N·m (167 lb·ft) of torque at 3,600 rpm.

Applications:

- 1998–2005 Toyota Hilux (G.C.C. and General Markets)
- 1997–2002 Toyota Land Cruiser Prado (90 Series)
- 1995–2004 Toyota HiAce (General Markets)

=== 3RZ-FE ===
The 3RZ-FE is a 2.7 L (2,693 cc) version. Bore and stroke is 95 mm × 95 mm (3.74 in × 3.74 in). Compression ratio is 9.5:1. Output is 150 hp (112 kW; 152 PS) at 4800 rpm with 177 lb⋅ft (240 N⋅m) of torque at 4000 rpm. This engine features twin, chain-driven balance shafts. It has four valves per cylinder and DOHC. Valve adjustment is by shim over bucket. The 3RZ-FE is an interference engine with a timing chain reported to last 150,000 miles. The cylinder head is composed of aluminum alloy and the intake manifold is made from aluminum.

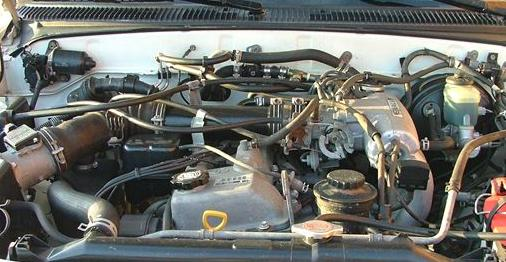
3RZ-FE in a Toyota T100

Applications:

- 1995–2004 Toyota Tacoma
- 1996–2000 Toyota 4Runner
- 1994–1998 Toyota T100
- 1995–2002 Granvia
- 1995–2004 Toyota Hilux
- 1990–2004 Toyota HiAce
- 2001–2009 Toyota Land Cruiser Prado (Venezuela)
- 1996–2004 Toyota Land Cruiser Prado
- 1998–2002 Toyota Touring Hiace

== See also ==
- List of Toyota engines
