= Toyota Motor Thailand =

Thai subsidiary company

Toyota Motor Thailand Co., Ltd. (TMT)
- Native name: บริษัท โตโยต้า มอเตอร์ ประเทศไทย จำกัด
- Company type: Subsidiary
- Industry: Automotive
- Genre: Motor cars
- Founded: 5 October 1962; 63 years ago
- Headquarters: Phra Pradaeng, Samut Prakan, Thailand
- Key people: Kalin Sarasin (Chairman); Noriaki Yamashita (President)
- Products: Automobiles, commercial vehicles, engines
- Production output: 760,000 vehicles (max.)
- Owner: Toyota Motor Corporation (86.4%)
- Website: www.toyota.co.th

Toyota Motor Thailand Co., Ltd. (TMT) is the wholly owned subsidiary of Toyota Motor Corporation in Thailand, established in 1962. In 1979, Toyota began making pressed body parts in Thailand. In 1989, TMT began manufacturing engines locally. TMT controls the manufacturing of Toyota cars in Thailand and they supply cars to various official dealers throughout Thailand. TMT's main export market is the ASEAN region and the Oceania, but TMT also export cars to different parts of the world, especially the Toyota Hilux Vigo model. As of April 2016, there were 150 official Toyota dealers with 455 showrooms approved by TMT.

== Operations ==
As of July 2016, TMT employed 16,477 at its Thai factories. Toyota Motor Thailand runs three plants in two provinces. The plant in Samrong, Samut Prakan Province produces pickup trucks and commercial vehicles. The two plants in Chachoengsao Province—at Ban Pho and Gateway—make passenger cars. The three plants have a combined maximum annual capacity of 760,000 units.

In 1988, Toyota Motor Thailand formed a joint venture with Toyota Auto Body called Toyota (formerly Thai) Auto Works. The venture is focused on producing the HiAce. Toyota Auto Body owns a 63% stake. The venture has another plant in Samut Prakan, the Teparak plant.

== Sales ==
Toyota posted its highest-ever Thai sales in 2012 at 516,086 vehicles, a 78 percent rise from 2011. Sales decreased by 13.7 percent to 445,464 in 2013 and shrank by 26.6 percent to 327,027 in 2014. In 2015, TMT reported sales of 266,005 vehicles, down 18.7 percent. Sales for the first five months of 2016 totalled 87,715 vehicles, down 13.4 percent from the same period in 2015. The company projected its 2016 whole-year sales to fall by 9.8 percent from 2015 to 240,000 vehicles, the fourth successive year of declining sales.

Thailand saw 1,007,552 new vehicles registered in 2019, a year-on-year decline of 3.3 percent. Toyota increased its Thai market share in 2019 to 33 percent, a 2.8 percent increase.

== Management ==
- Chairman: Mr Kalin Sarasin
- President: Mr Noriaki Yamashita
- Honorary Executive Adviser: Ninnart Chaithirapinyo
- Executive Assistant: Surasak Suthongwan
- Executive Vice President: Surapoom Udomwong
- Vice President: Pravena Nuntilkuvanich
- Senior Executive Adviser & Treasurer: Tomohiko Deguchi

== Models ==
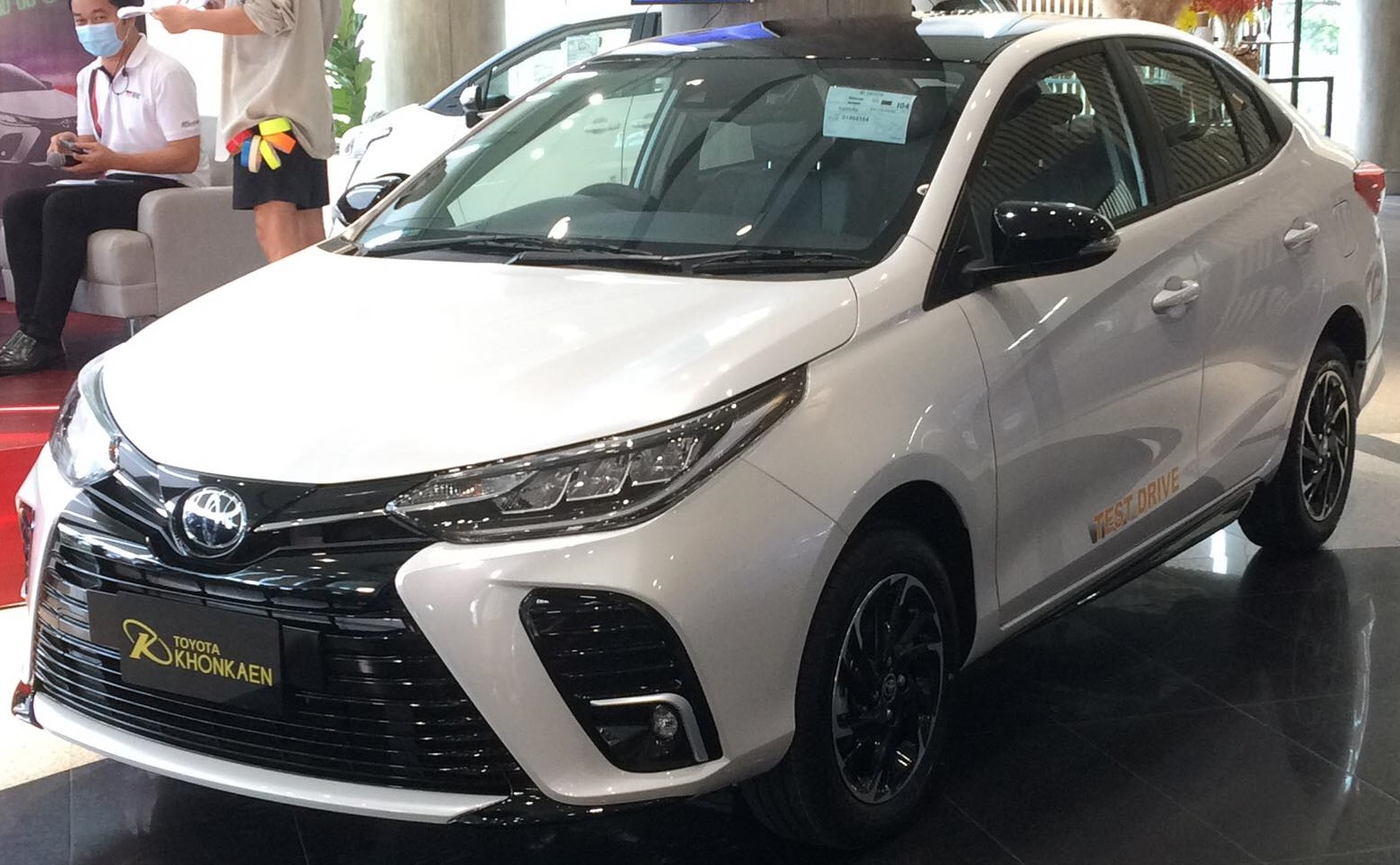
The Thai-built 2021 Yaris Ativ Sport Premium.

=== Manufactured locally ===
The following is a list of plants and their products.

==== Chachoengsao (Gateway) Plant ====
- Toyota Camry (1999–present)
- Toyota Corolla Altis (2001–present)
- Toyota Yaris (2013–present)
- Toyota Yaris Ativ (2017–present, exported as Toyota Vios)
- Toyota Corolla Cross (2020–present)
- Toyota Yaris Cross (2023–present)

==== Samrong Plant ====
- Toyota Hilux (1975–present)

==== Theparak Plant (Toyota Auto Works venture) ====
- Toyota HiAce (1992–present)

==== Ban Pho Plant ====
- Toyota Hilux (2007–present)
- Toyota Fortuner (2007-present)
- Toyota Hilux Champ (2023–present)
- Toyota Land Cruiser FJ (2026–present)

=== Imported ===
- Toyota Alphard (2009–present)
- Toyota Coaster (2019–present)
- Toyota Vellfire (2015–present)
- Toyota Majesty (2019–present)
- Toyota GR Supra (2019–present)
- Toyota Veloz (2022–present)
- Toyota GR86 (2022–present)
- Toyota bZ4X (2022–present)
- Toyota Innova Zenix (2023–present)
- Toyota GR Corolla (8AT; 2024–present)
- Toyota GR Yaris (8AT; 2024–present)

=== Former models ===
==== Manufactured locally ====
- Toyota C-HR (2018–2023)
- Toyota Corolla (1972–2001)
- Toyopet Tiara/Toyota Corona (1964–1999)
- Toyota Crown (1970–1995)
- Toyota Dyna (1964–1999)
- Toyota Hilux Sport Rider (1998–2004)
- Toyota Prius (2010–2015)
- Toyota Soluna (1996–2003)
- Toyota Starlet (1985–1988)
- Toyota Stout (1964–1975)
- Toyota Wish (2003–2009)
- Toyota Ventury (2005–2019)
- Toyota Yaris (2006–2013)
- Daihatsu Charade (2011–2013, export only)
- Toyota Vios/Toyota Soluna Vios (2002–2022)

==== Imported ====
- Toyota 86 (2012–2017)
- Toyota Avanza
- Toyota Camry (1993–1999)
- Toyota Camry Esport (2015–2018)
- Toyota Celica
- Toyota Cressida
- Toyota Crown
- Toyota GR Corolla (6MT)
- Toyota GR Yaris (6MT)
- Toyota Innova
- Toyota Innova Crysta
- Toyota Land Cruiser
- Toyota Land Cruiser Prado
- Toyota LiteAce
- Toyota Paseo (1992–1995)
- Toyota Prius
- Toyota Prius C
- Toyota Previa (1993–1995)
- Toyota RAV4 (1996–1999)
- Toyota Sienta
