= Toyota TR engine =

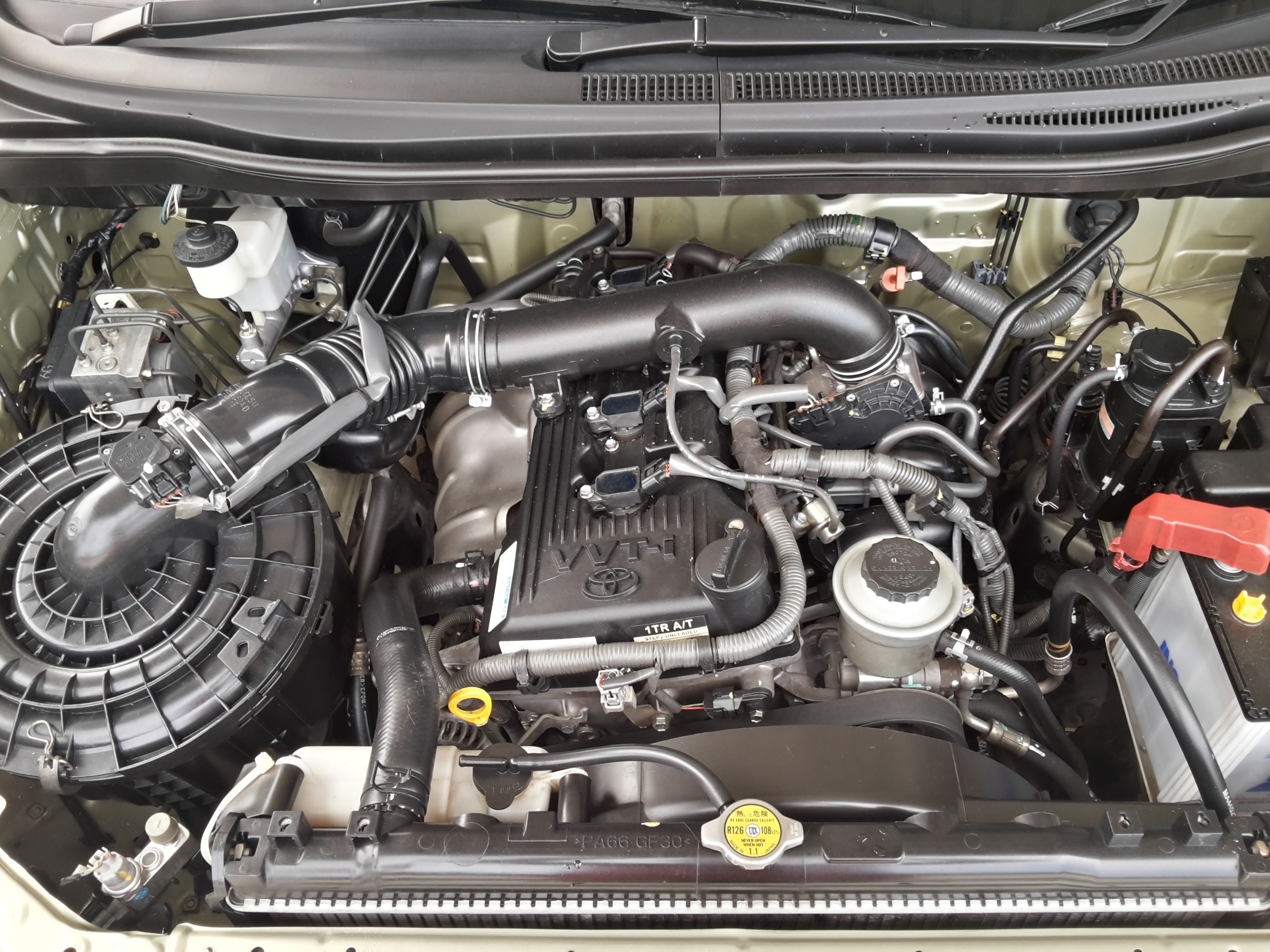
- 1TR-FE engine

Overview
- Manufacturer: Toyota Motor Corporation
- Production: July 2003–present (1TR-FE); August 2004–present (2TR-FE); December 2007–July 2021 (1TR-FPE)

Layout
- Configuration: Straight-4
- Displacement: 1,998 cc (2.0 L); 2,693 cc (2.7 L)
- Cylinder bore: 86 mm (3.4 in); 95 mm (3.7 in)
- Piston stroke: 86 mm (3.4 in); 95 mm (3.7 in)
- Cylinder block material: Cast iron
- Cylinder head material: Aluminium
- Valvetrain: DOHC 4 valves per cylinder with VVT-i or Dual VVT-i
- Valvetrain drive system: Timing chain
- Compression ratio: 9.6–10.6

Combustion
- Fuel system: Multi-point fuel injection
- Fuel type: Petrol; LPG
- Cooling system: Water-cooled

Output
- Power output: 113–163 PS (83–120 kW; 111–161 hp)
- Torque output: 182–246 N⋅m (134.2–181.4 lb⋅ft; 18.6–25.1 kg⋅m)

Chronology
- Predecessor: Toyota RZ engine

The Toyota TR engine is a family of DOHC 16-valve petrol engines produced by Toyota, started in July 2003. These engines are primarily used in medium-sized passenger and commercial vehicles with body-on-frame platforms. They are designed for longitudinal mounting in both rear-wheel drive and four-wheel drive applications. Every engine in the TR series is a square engine, meaning the bore diameter and stroke length are equal.

In January 2015, the TR engines were updated with Dual VVT-i technology, identifiable by the additional VVT-i solenoid on the top of the cylinder head cover. However, the original single VVT-i configuration remains in production for specific vehicle models.

== 1TR-FE ==
The 1TR-FE is a 2.0 L (1,998 cc) version of the TR engine. Bore and stroke are 86 mm × 86 mm (3.39 in × 3.39 in), and the compression ratio is 9.8:1. Its power is 133–136 PS (98–100 kW; 131–134 hp) at 5,600 rpm, and 182 N⋅m (134.2 lb⋅ft; 18.6 kg⋅m) of torque at 4,000 rpm with a redline of 6000 rpm.

In January 2015, the 1TR-FE engine was updated with Dual VVT-i technology and a higher 10.4:1 compression ratio. The updated power is 136–139 PS (100–102 kW; 134–137 hp) at 5,600 rpm and 182–183 N⋅m (134–135 lb⋅ft; 19–19 kg⋅m) of torque at 4,000 rpm.

=== Applications ===
- 2003–2025 Toyota Dyna Y200
- 2003–2025 Toyota HiAce H100/200
- 2003–2020 Toyota RegiusAce H100/200
- 2003–2020 Toyota ToyoAce Y200
- 2004–present Toyota Hilux AN10/110
- 2004–2025 Toyota Innova AN40/140
- 2007–2018 Toyota Comfort XS10
- 2023–present Toyota Hilux Champ AN110
- 2003–2025 Hino Dutro Y200
- 2019–2025 Mazda Bongo Brawny H200

== 1TR-FPE ==
The 1TR-FPE is an LPG version of the 1TR-FE engine with a higher 10.6:1 compression ratio. Initially, it produced 116 PS (85 kW; 114 hp) at 4,800 rpm and torque is 189 N⋅m (139 lb⋅ft; 19 kg⋅m) at 3,600 rpm. In 2010, the output was revised to produce 113 PS (83 kW; 111 hp) at 4,800 rpm and torque is 186 N⋅m (137.2 lb⋅ft; 19.0 kg⋅m) at 3,600 rpm. Unlike the regular 1TR-FE engine, this engine was never updated with Dual VVT-i technology.

=== Applications ===
- 2003–2021 Toyota Dyna/ToyoAce/Hino Dutro Y200
- 2008–2018 Toyota Crown Comfort XS10

== 2TR-FE ==
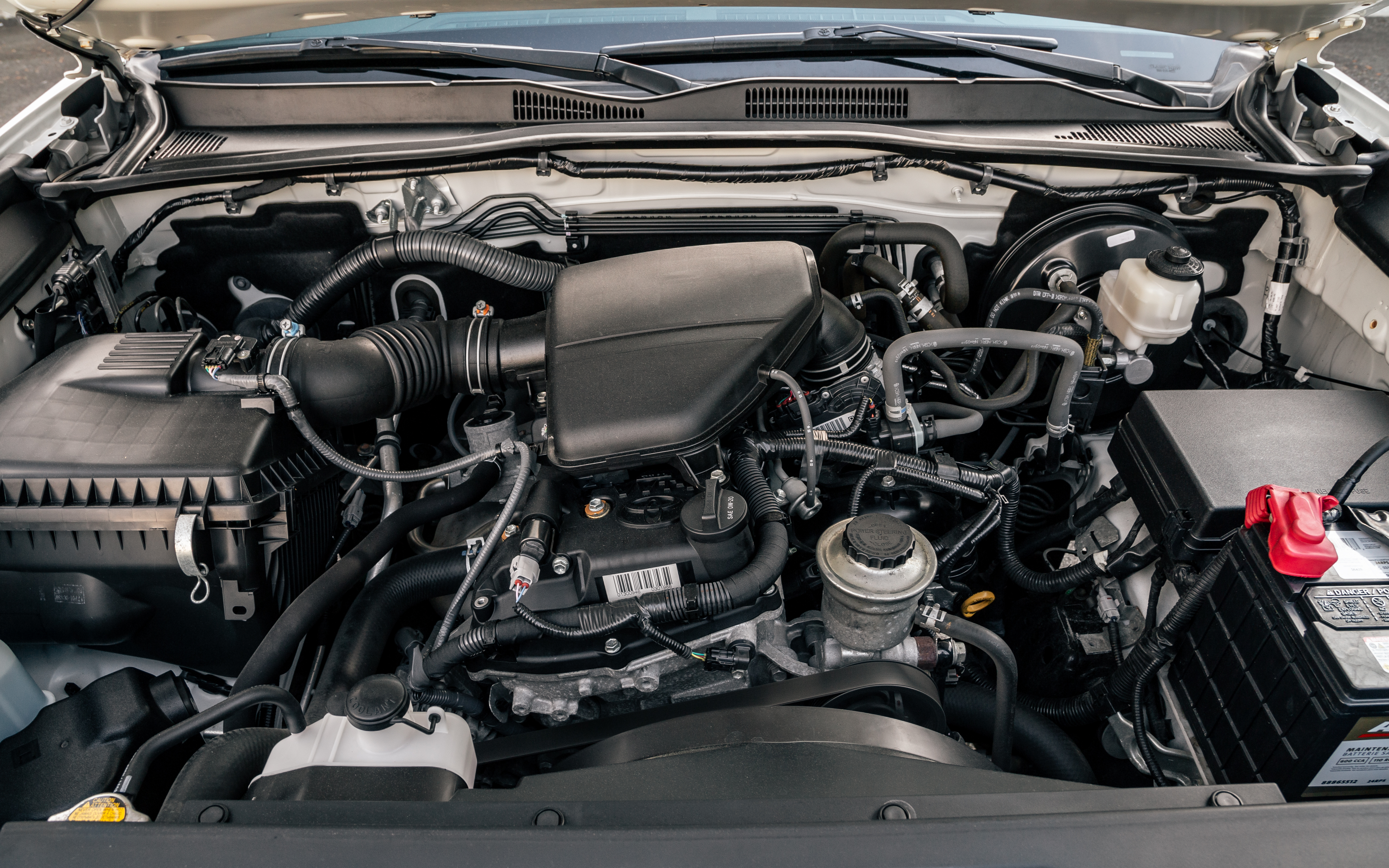
The updated Toyota 2TR-FE engine with Dual VVT-i cylinder head.

The 2TR-FE is a 2.7 L (2,693 cc) version of the TR engine. The bore and stroke are 95 mm × 95 mm (3.74 in × 3.74 in), and the compression ratio is 9.6:1. Maximum power is 151–163 PS (111–120 kW; 149–161 hp) at 4,800–5,200 rpm, and 241–246 N⋅m (177.8–181.4 lb⋅ft; 24.6–25.1 kg⋅m) of torque at 3,800 rpm with redline of 5,500 rpm. Average fuel consumption using the JC08 method is 9 km/L (25 mpg_{‑imp}; 21 mpg_{‑US}).

Like the smaller 1TR-FE, the 2TR-FE was also received updates in January 2015 to feature Dual VVT-i and a higher 10.2:1 compression ratio. The maximum power with Dual VVT-i is 160–163 PS (118–120 kW; 158–161 hp) at 5,200 rpm, and 243–246 N⋅m (179.2–181.4 lb⋅ft; 24.8–25.1 kg⋅m) of torque at 3,800–4,000 rpm.

There was also a version of 2TR-FE engine made by FAW Toyota called 3TR-FE, exclusively for the Chinese market Toyota Coaster B50 from 2013 to 2019. Unlike the 2TR-FE, the 3TR-FE was never updated with the Dual VVT-i technology.

=== Applications ===
- 2004–present Toyota HiAce H200
- 2004–present Toyota Hilux AN10/110/220
- 2004–2009 Toyota Hilux Surf N210
- 2004–2022 Toyota Innova AN40/140
- 2004–present Toyota Land Cruiser Prado J120/150/250
- 2004–2020 Toyota RegiusAce H200
- 2004–2023 Toyota Tacoma N220/240/260
- 2005–present Toyota Fortuner/SW4 AN50/150
- 2006–present Toyota HiMedic H200
- 2007–present Toyota Coaster B40/50/60/70
- 2007–2016 Toyota Dyna/ToyoAce/Hino Dutro U300/500/600
- 2009–2010 Toyota 4Runner N280
- 2023–present Toyota Hilux Champ AN110
- 2026–present Toyota Land Cruiser FJ J240

== See also ==
- List of Toyota engines
