= Toyota Hilux Champ =

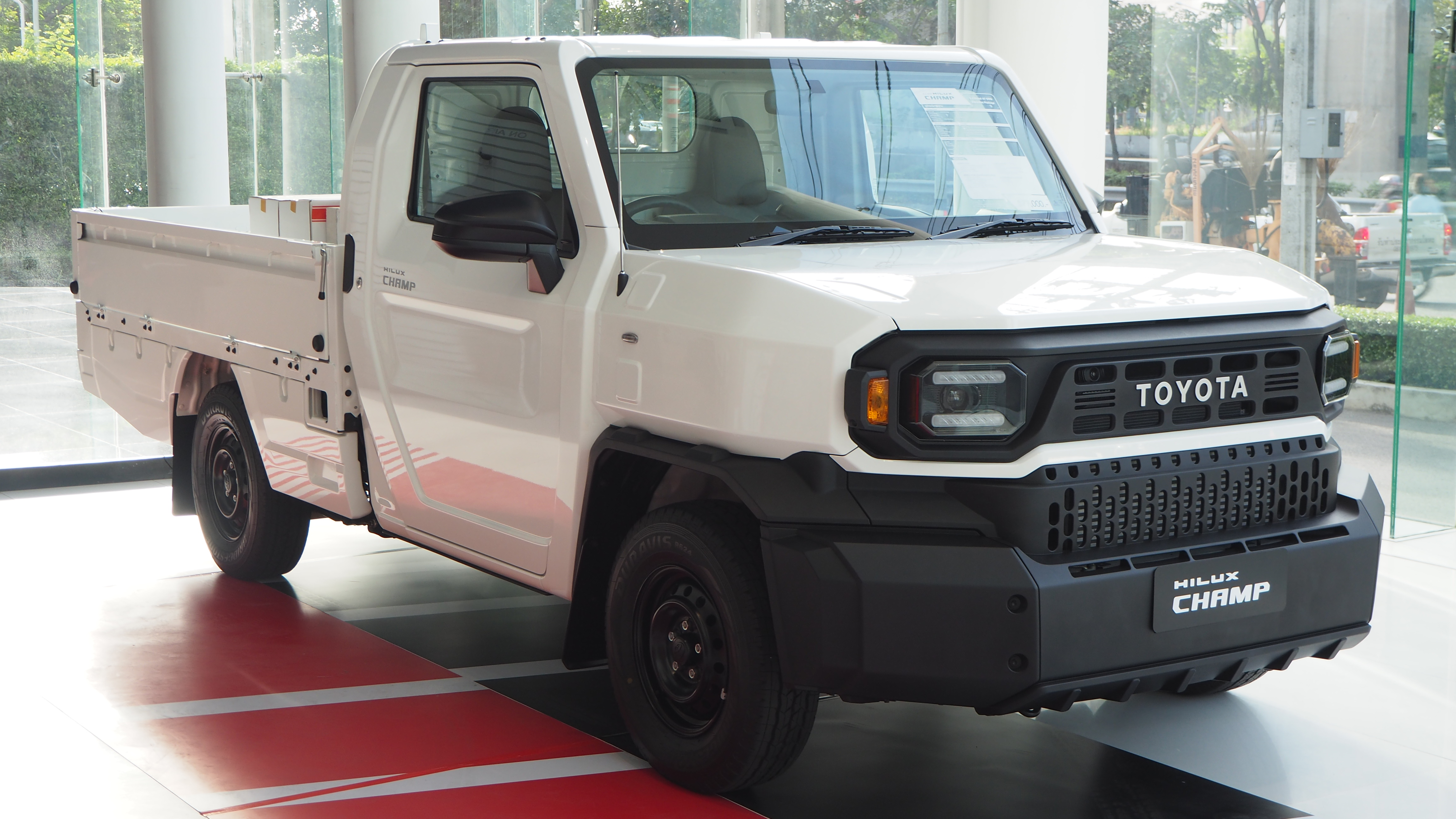
- 2023 Toyota Hilux Champ (Thailand)

Overview
- Manufacturer: Toyota
- Model code: AN110; AN120
- Also called: Toyota Hilux Rangga (Indonesia); Toyota Tamaraw (Philippines); Toyota Hilux Stout (Peru)
- Production: November 2023 – present
- Assembly: Thailand: Ban Pho (TMT); Philippines: Santa Rosa, Laguna (TMP)

Body and chassis
- Class: Compact pickup truck Light commercial vehicle
- Body style: 2-door pickup; 2-door chassis cab; 4-door utility van
- Layout: Front-engine, rear-wheel-drive
- Platform: Toyota IMV
- Chassis: Body-on-frame
- Related: Toyota Hilux (AN110/AN120/AN130); Toyota Land Cruiser FJ

Powertrain
- Engine: Petrol: 2.0 L 1TR-FE I4; 2.7 L 2TR-FE I4; Diesel: 2.4 L 2GD-FTV turbo I4
- Transmission: 5-speed R151 manual; 6-speed AC60 automatic

Dimensions
- Wheelbase: 2,580 mm (101.6 in) (Super SWB); 2,750 mm (108.3 in) (SWB); 3,085 mm (121.5 in) (LWB)
- Length: 4,520 mm (178.0 in) (Super SWB); 4,705 mm (185.2 in) (SWB, chassis cab); 4,970 mm (195.7 in) (SWB); 5,040 mm (198.4 in) (LWB, chassis cab); 5,300 mm (208.7 in) (LWB)
- Width: 1,785 mm (70.3 in)
- Height: 1,735 mm (68.3 in)

Chronology
- Predecessor: Toyota Kijang (F60) (Indonesia)

The Toyota Hilux Champ is a light commercial vehicle manufactured by the Japanese carmaker Toyota since 2023. Based on the Hilux, the Hilux Champ is positioned below it as a simpler and more affordable alternative. It is available as a two-door pickup truck or two-door chassis cab, and primarily targets emerging markets.

== Overview ==
=== Development ===
Based on the IMV platform, the Hilux Champ was designed and engineered by Toyota Daihatsu Engineering & Manufacturing (TDEM) in collaboration with Japanese and Australian engineering teams. The development of the Hilux Champ was led by its chief engineer Jurachart Jongusuk, who was also the chief engineer for the 2020 and 2024 facelifts of the Hilux and the 2020 facelift of the Fortuner.

The vehicle adopts a rugged styling, with extensive use of angular, boxy lines, and was designed with modularity in mind as owners through body builders are able to mount a customized rear section to the chassis using bolts, making conversions easier.

Sharing its platform with the Hilux, it uses the same ladder frame underpinnings with leaf spring suspension at the rear axle. For easier city use, the Hilux Champ is designed with shorter bonnet and cab. The steering rack is also modified from the Hilux to create shorter turning radius at 4.9 metres (16.1 ft) for the short-wheelbase version.

=== Initial release ===
The Hilux Champ was first revealed as a single-cab pickup concept called the Toyota IMV 0 that was presented on 14 December 2022 at Toyota Motor Thailand's 60th anniversary event, hosted by Akio Toyoda. Toyoda stated "Internally we call it the IMV 0 concept. Its official launch is actually over a year away, but I wanted all of you to be the first to see it!".

The IMV 0 was later showcased in Indonesia as the Rangga Concept at the 30th Gaikindo Indonesia International Auto Show held from 10 to 20 August 2023, and later in the Philippines as the Next Generation Tamaraw Concept on 22 August 2023 at Toyota Motor Philippines' 35th anniversary event. The IMV 0 was also showcased in Japan at the 2023 Japan Mobility Show held from 26 October to 5 November 2023. Through those aforementioned events, Toyota displayed multiple applications of the vehicle to highlight its modularity, such as a mobile cafe, cargo truck, ambulance, an off-road-modified vehicle, a race-inspired flat-deck street truck, a camper, and a modern Jeepney.

The production version was revealed on 27 November 2023 in Thailand.

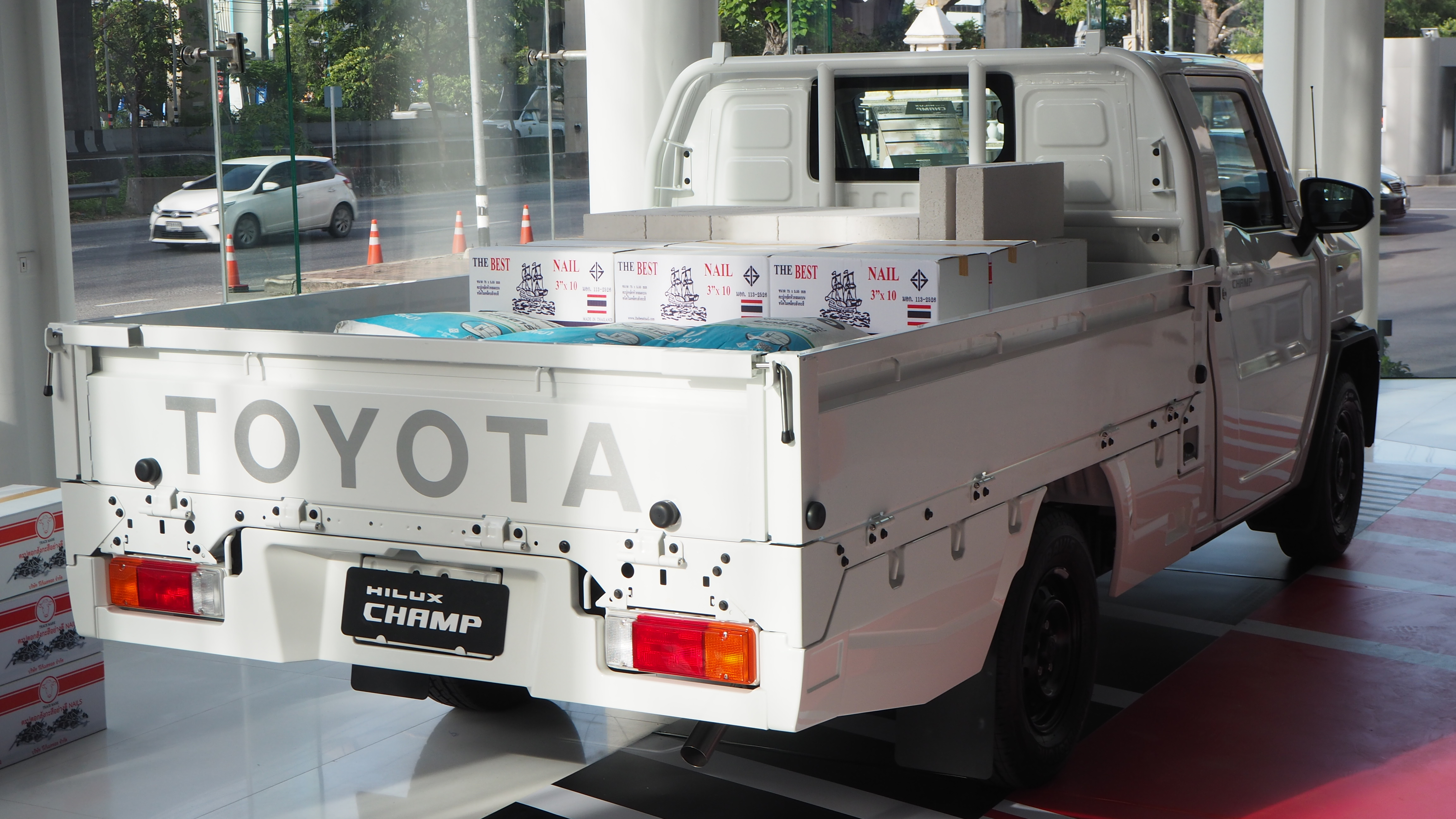
Rear view

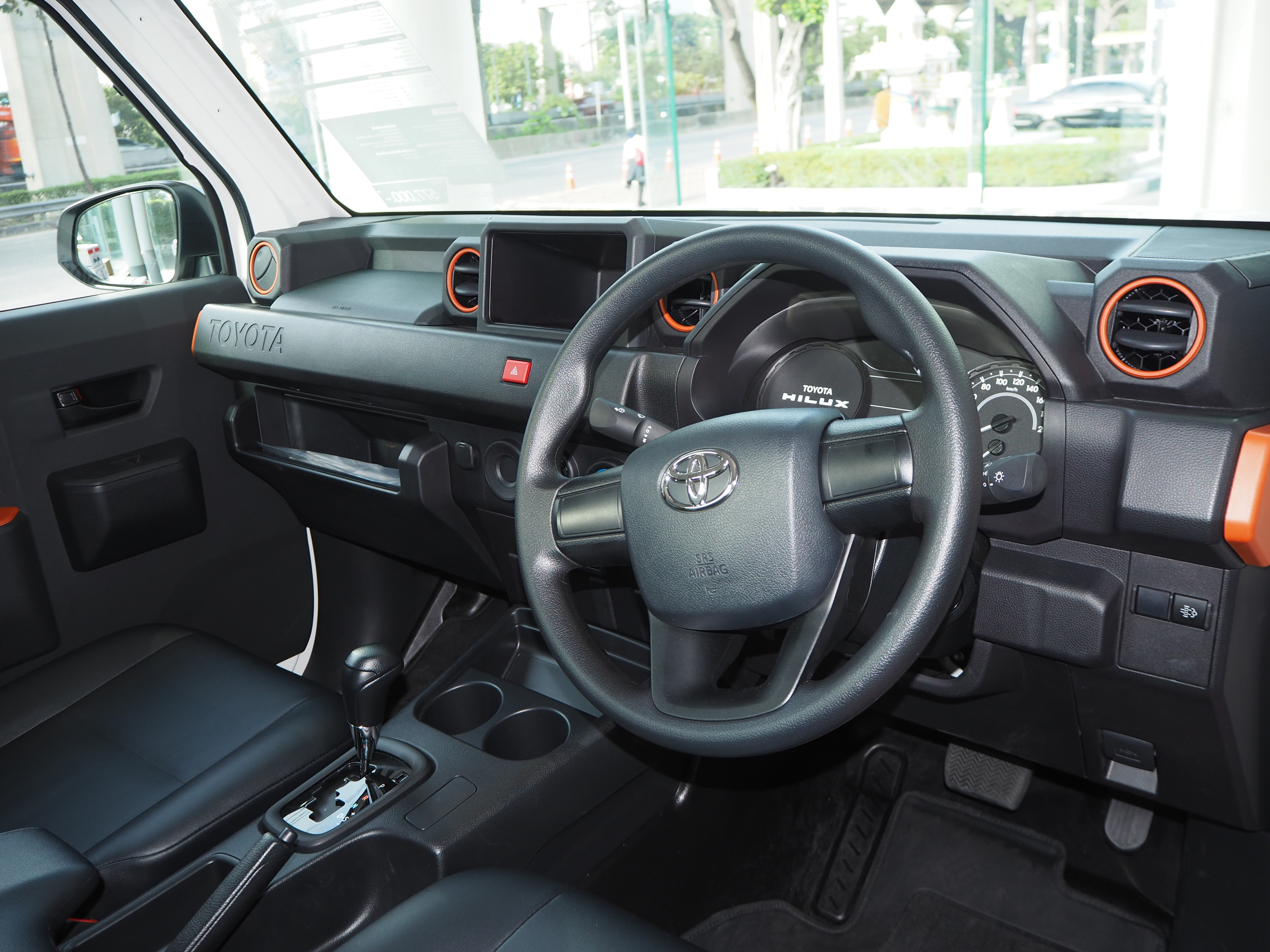
Interior

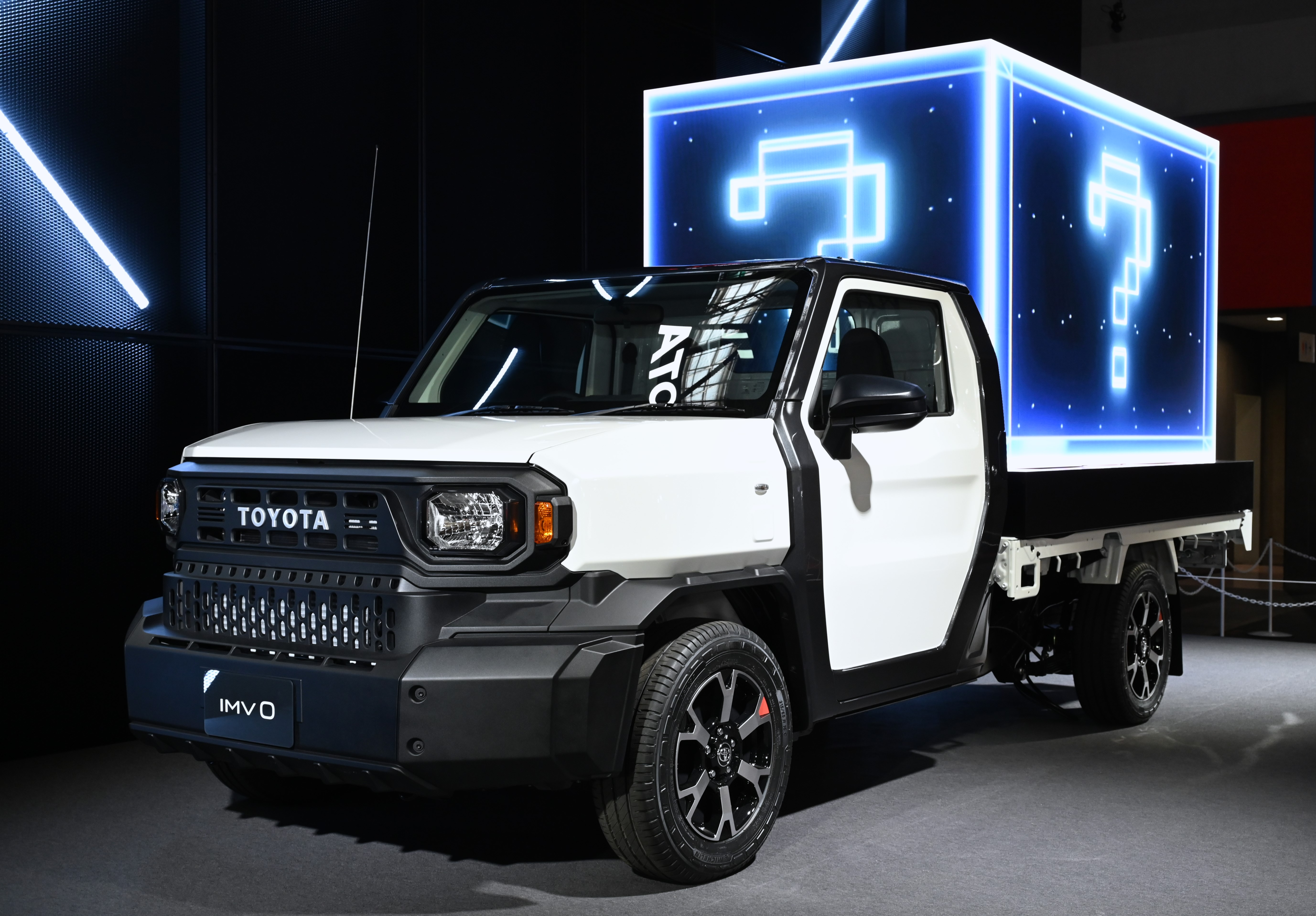
Toyota IMV 0 (concept)

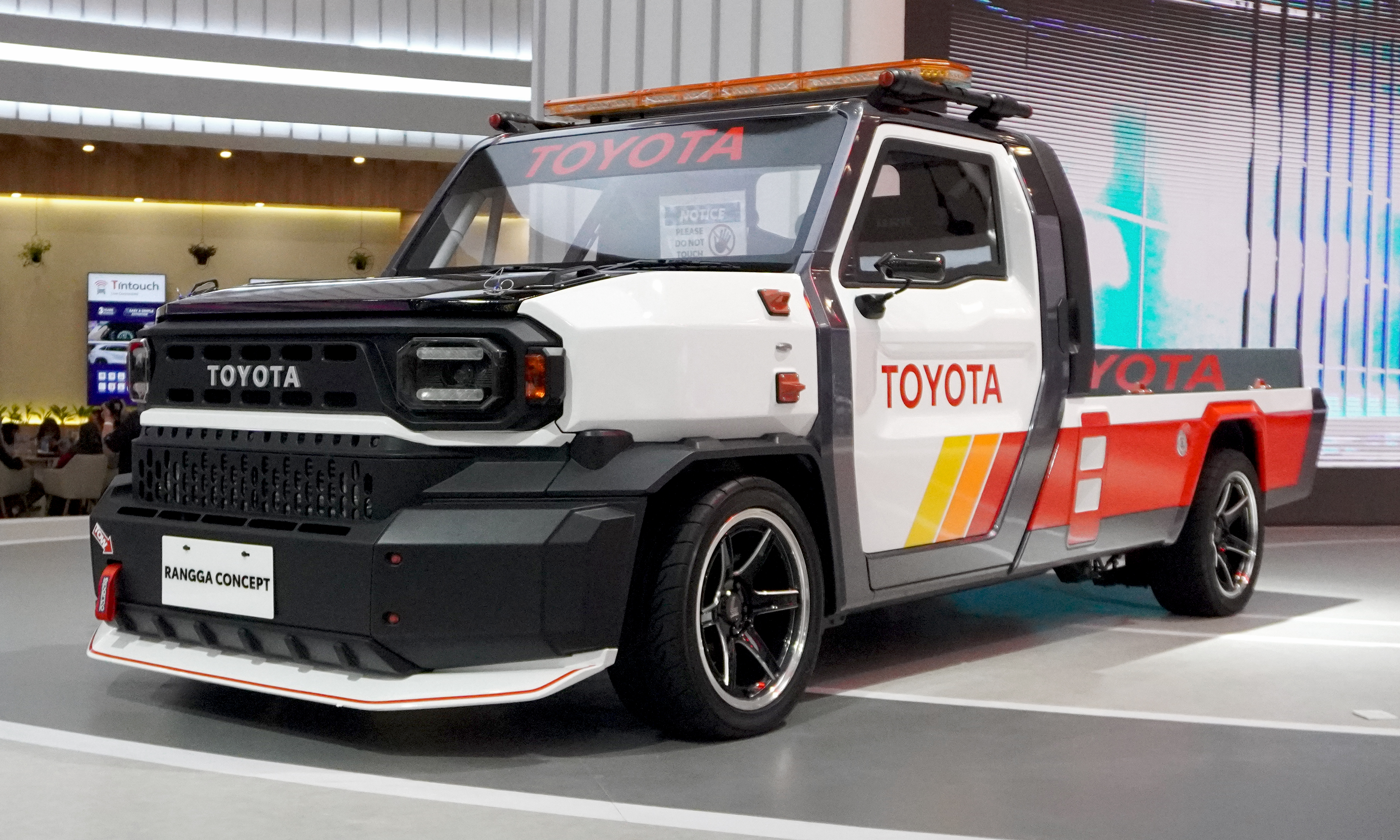
Toyota Rangga Concept flat-deck street truck (Indonesia)

== Powertrain ==
The Hilux Champ is available with 2.0-litre and 2.7-litre petrol engines, and a 2.4-litre diesel engine, which are carried over from other IMV vehicles such as the Hilux, Fortuner and Innova.

Type	Engine code	Displacement	Power	Torque	Transmission	Model code	Layout	Calendar years
Petrol	1TR-FE	1,998 cc (2.0 L) I4 with Dual VVT-i	102 kW (137 hp; 139 PS) @ 5,600 rpm	183 N⋅m (18.7 kg⋅m; 135 lb⋅ft) @ 4,000 rpm	5-speed R151 manual		RWD	2023–present
Petrol	2TR-FE	2,693 cc (2.7 L) I4 with Dual VVT-i	122 kW (164 hp; 166 PS) @ 5,200 rpm	245 N⋅m (25.0 kg⋅m; 181 lb⋅ft) @ 4,000 rpm	6-speed AC60 automatic		RWD	2023–present
Diesel	2GD-FTV	2,393 cc (2.4 L) turbocharged I4	110 kW (148 hp; 150 PS) @ 3,400 rpm	343 N⋅m (35.0 kg⋅m; 253 lb⋅ft) @ 1,400–2,800 rpm	5-speed R151 manual	GUN112; GUN122	RWD	2023–present
Diesel	2GD-FTV	2,393 cc (2.4 L) turbocharged I4	110 kW (148 hp; 150 PS) @ 3,400 rpm	400 N⋅m (40.8 kg⋅m; 295 lb⋅ft) @ 1,600–2,000 rpm	6-speed AC60 automatic	GUN112; GUN122	RWD	2023–present

== Markets ==
=== South America ===
==== Peru ====
In Peru, the Hilux Champ is sold as the Hilux Stout, deriving its nameplate from the Toyota Stout. It was launched on 29 August 2024, only available in a short-wheelbase version with a 2.4-litre diesel engine.

=== Southeast Asia ===
==== Thailand ====
The Hilux Champ went on sale in Thailand on 27 November 2023. It is available with a choice of three engine options; a 2.0-litre petrol, a 2.4-litre diesel, or a 2.7-litre petrol. It is available in short-wheelbase and long-wheelbase options, with the latter option only available with the 2.4-litre diesel engine.

==== Indonesia ====
Toyota's Indonesian subsidiary, Toyota Astra Motor marketed the vehicle as the Hilux Rangga in the country since 2024. The name Rangga was formerly used for a variant of the pre-facelift fourth-generation Kijang sold between 1997 and 2000, and is taken from the Javanese word ronggo, meaning 'hero'. The finalized specification model was revealed at the 31st Indonesia International Motor Show in February 2024. Sales commenced on 15 October 2024. It is only available in a short-wheelbase version with two variants: Standard and High. Both variants are available with a choice of two engine options; a 2.0-litre petrol and a 2.4-litre diesel.

A three-row SUV version was also revealed during its nationwide launch event as a prototype vehicle called the Hilux Rangga SUV Concept. The revealed prototype is based on the 2.4 High type, with the entire rear section is built by the local coachbuilder New Armada using a full-pressing method. The side mirrors and tail lights were taken from the Land Cruiser 79 wagon. The model is stated to enter production and will be sold through Toyota dealers in the country starting 2025.

==== Philippines ====
In the Philippines, the Hilux Champ is marketed simply as the Tamaraw, resurrecting the nameplate that was last used by the Philippine specification version of the Kijang sold between 1976 and 2005. Although marketing materials refer the vehicle as the 'Tamaraw', the vehicle itself retains the physical 'Hilux' name on the doors and instrument cluster.

The production model was revealed in May 2024 at the 17th Toyota Road Trek event in Davao. Sales commenced on 6 December 2024 for the 2025 model year. It is available in short-wheelbase and long-wheelbase options; the SWB option is equipped with a 2.0-litre petrol engine paired with a 5-speed manual transmission, while the LWB option is equipped with a 2.4-litre diesel engine paired with either 5-speed manual or 6-speed automatic transmissions. Extra options such as alloy wheels, power windows, door locks and mirrors are only available on the 2.4 GL Dropside LWB variant. It is locally assembled at Toyota Motor Philippines' plant in Santa Rosa, Laguna, with production commencing on 28 November 2024, initially for the 2.4 LWB diesel models. Although initially announced at launch, the 2.0 SWB petrol models were delayed to February 2025, due to the plant's on-going capacity building for the vehicle at the time of its initial launch.

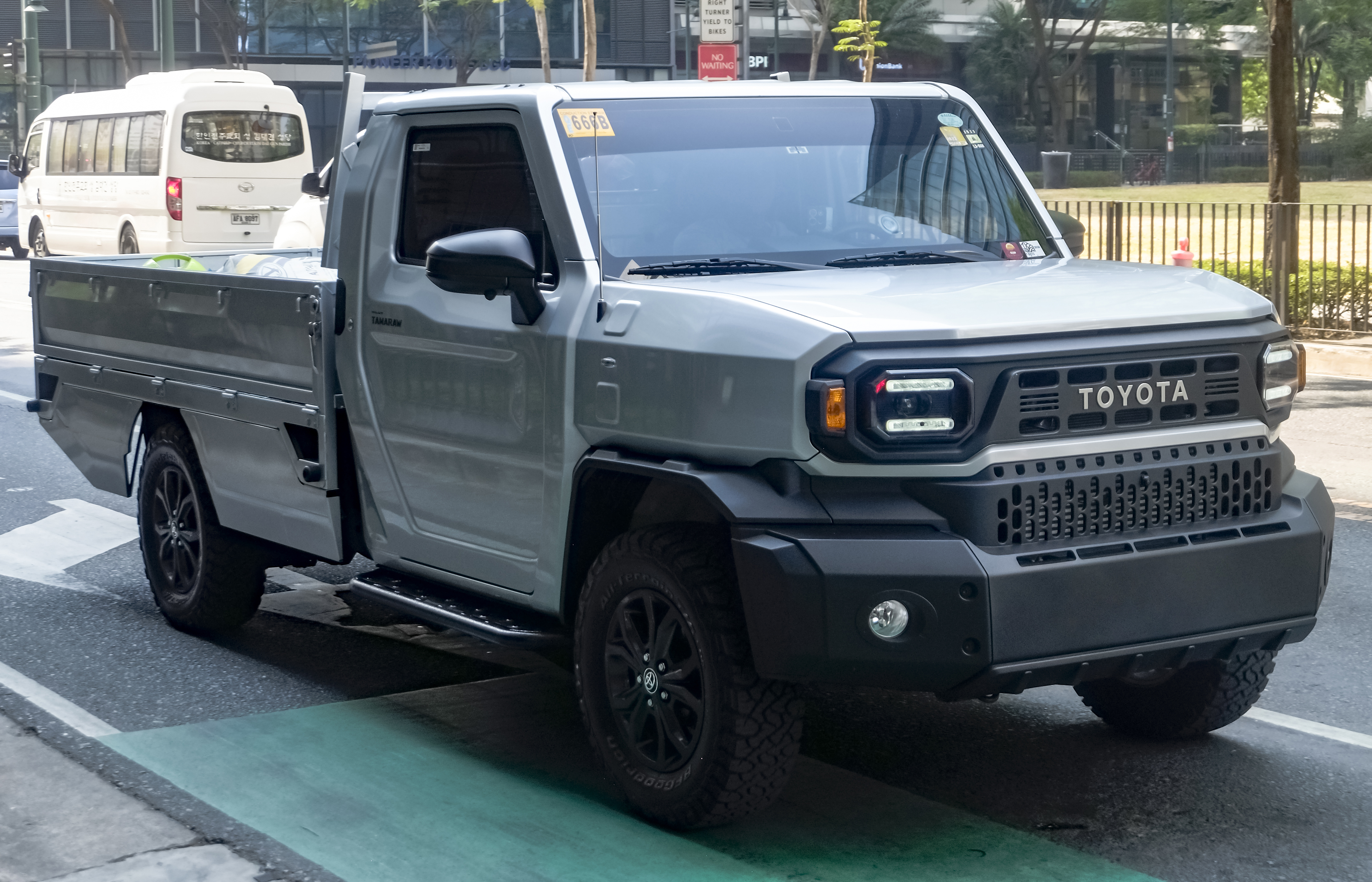
Toyota Tamaraw GL Dropside

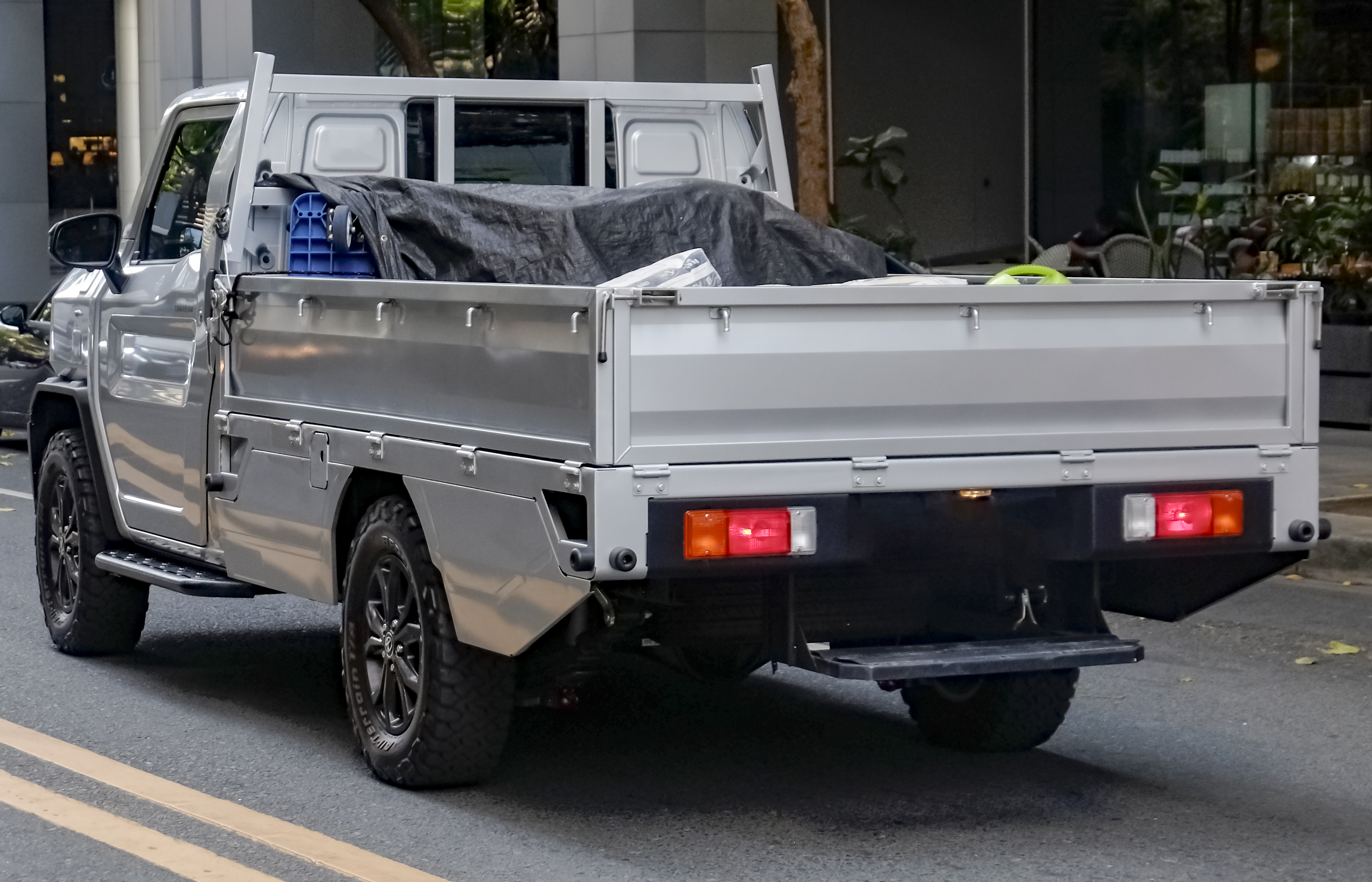
Toyota Tamaraw GL Dropside

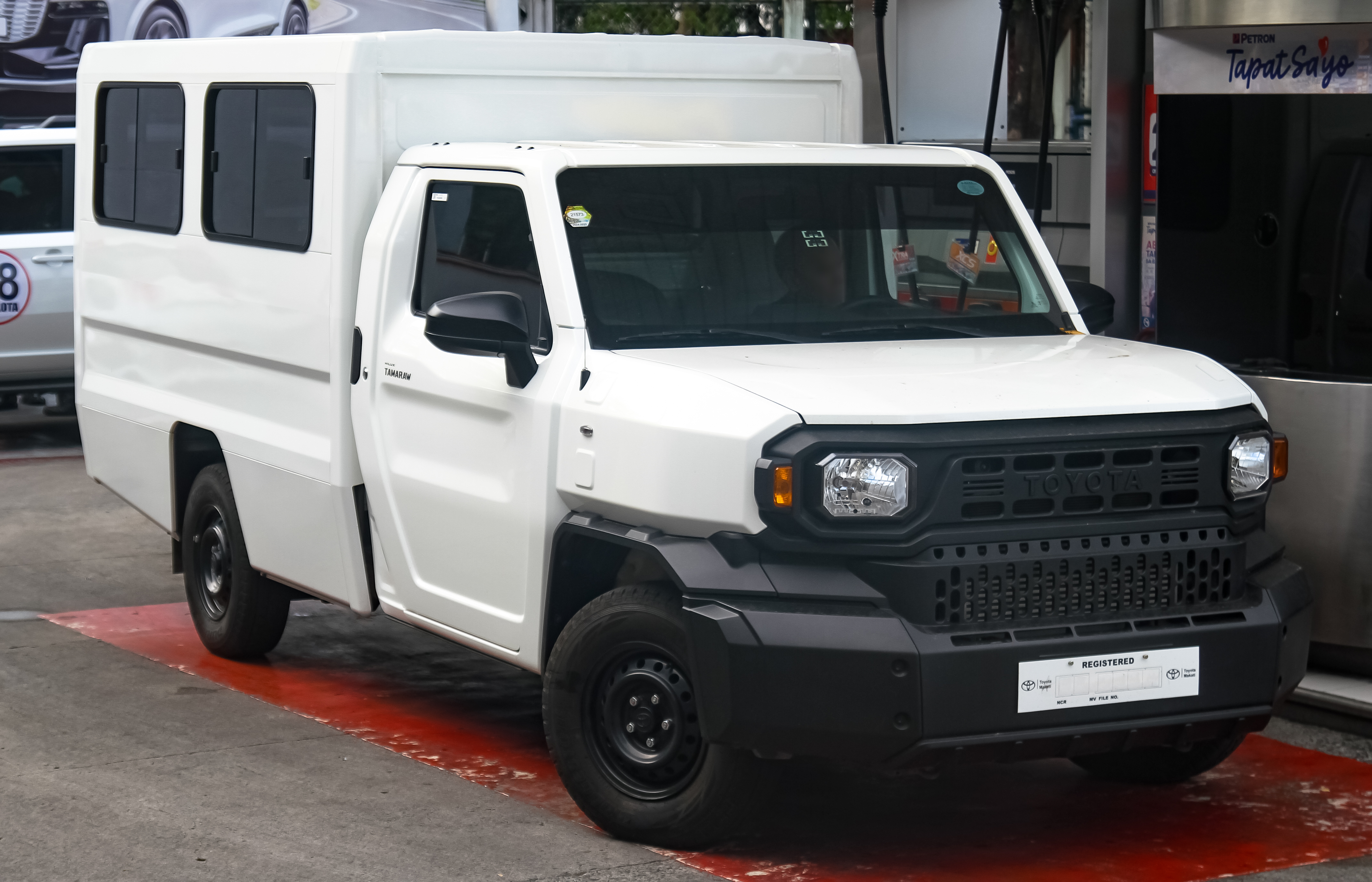
Toyota Tamaraw LWB utility van

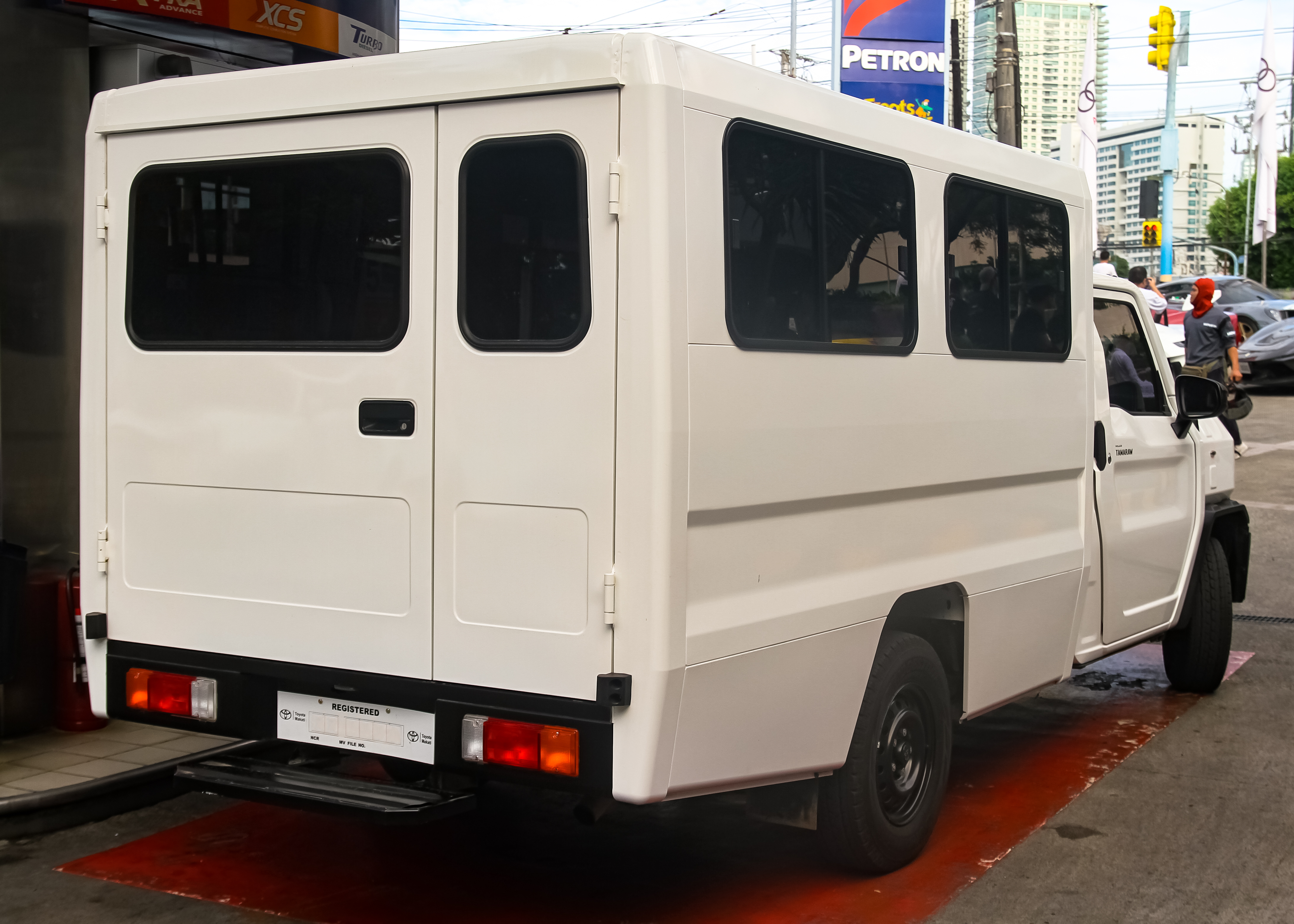
Toyota Tamaraw LWB utility van
