= Toyota HiAce =

Light commercial vehicle manufactured by Toyota

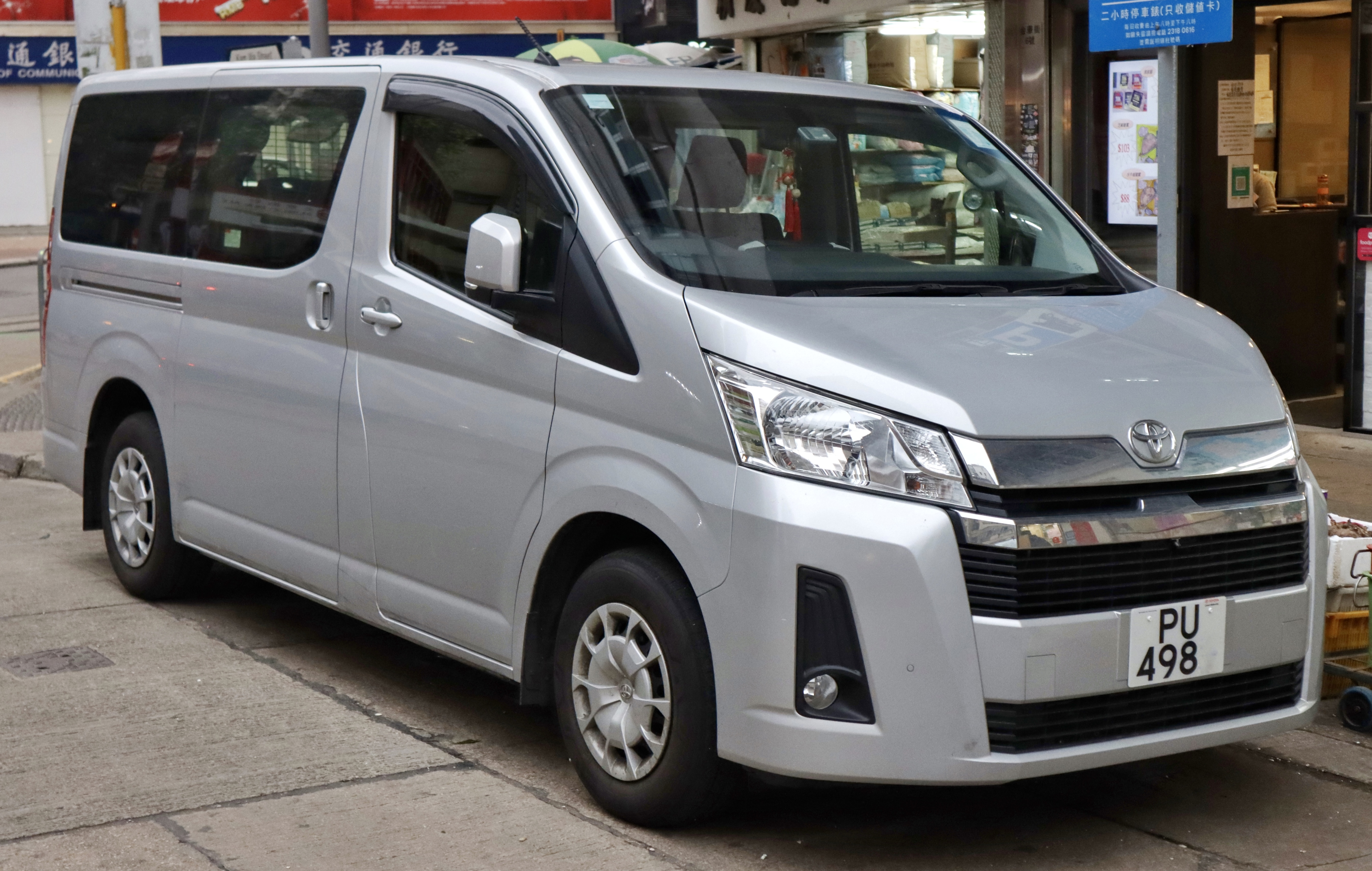

Overview
- Manufacturer: Toyota
- Production: October 1967 – present

Body and chassis
- Class: Light commercial vehicle
- Body style: Pickup truck (1967–1995); Van; Minibus

The Toyota HiAce (Japanese: トヨタ・ハイエース, Hepburn: Toyota Haiēsu) (pronounced "High Ace") is a light commercial vehicle produced by the Japanese automobile manufacturer Toyota. First launched in October 1967, the HiAce has since been available in a wide range of body configurations, including a minivan/MPV, minibus, panel van, crew van, pickup truck, taxi and an ambulance.

== First generation (H10; 1967) ==
First generation
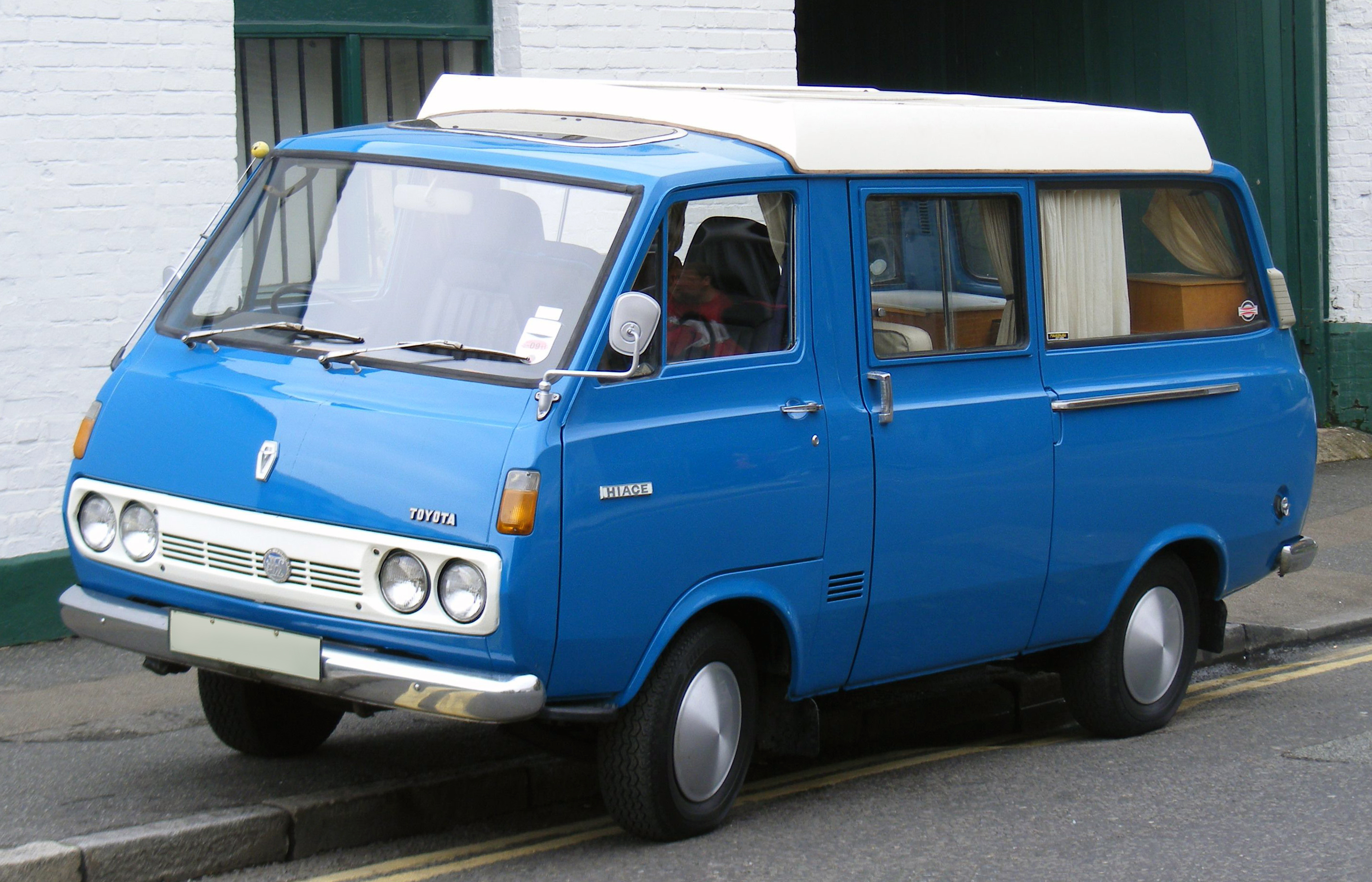
- Toyota HiAce camper van

Overview
- Model code: H10
- Production: October 1967 – January 1977
- Assembly: Japan: Hamura, Tokyo (Hino Motors); Kariya, Aichi (Toyota Auto Body); Toyota, Aichi (Honsha plant); Indonesia: Sunter, Jakarta

Body and chassis
- Body style: 2-door pickup; 4/5-door van
- Layout: Front-engine, rear-wheel-drive
- Related: Toyota ToyoAce

Powertrain
- Engine: 1.3 L (1,345 cc) 3P I4 (PH10); 1.5 L (1,490 cc) 2R I4 (RH10); 1.6 L (1,587 cc) 12R I4 (RH11/13/16); 1.8 L (1,808 cc) 16R I4 (RH12/14/17)
- Transmission: 4-speed manual

Dimensions
- Wheelbase: 2,350 mm (93 in)
- Length: 4,305 mm (169.5 in)
- Width: 1,690 mm (67 in)
- Height: 1,890 mm (74 in)
- Curb weight: 1,130 kg (2,490 lb)

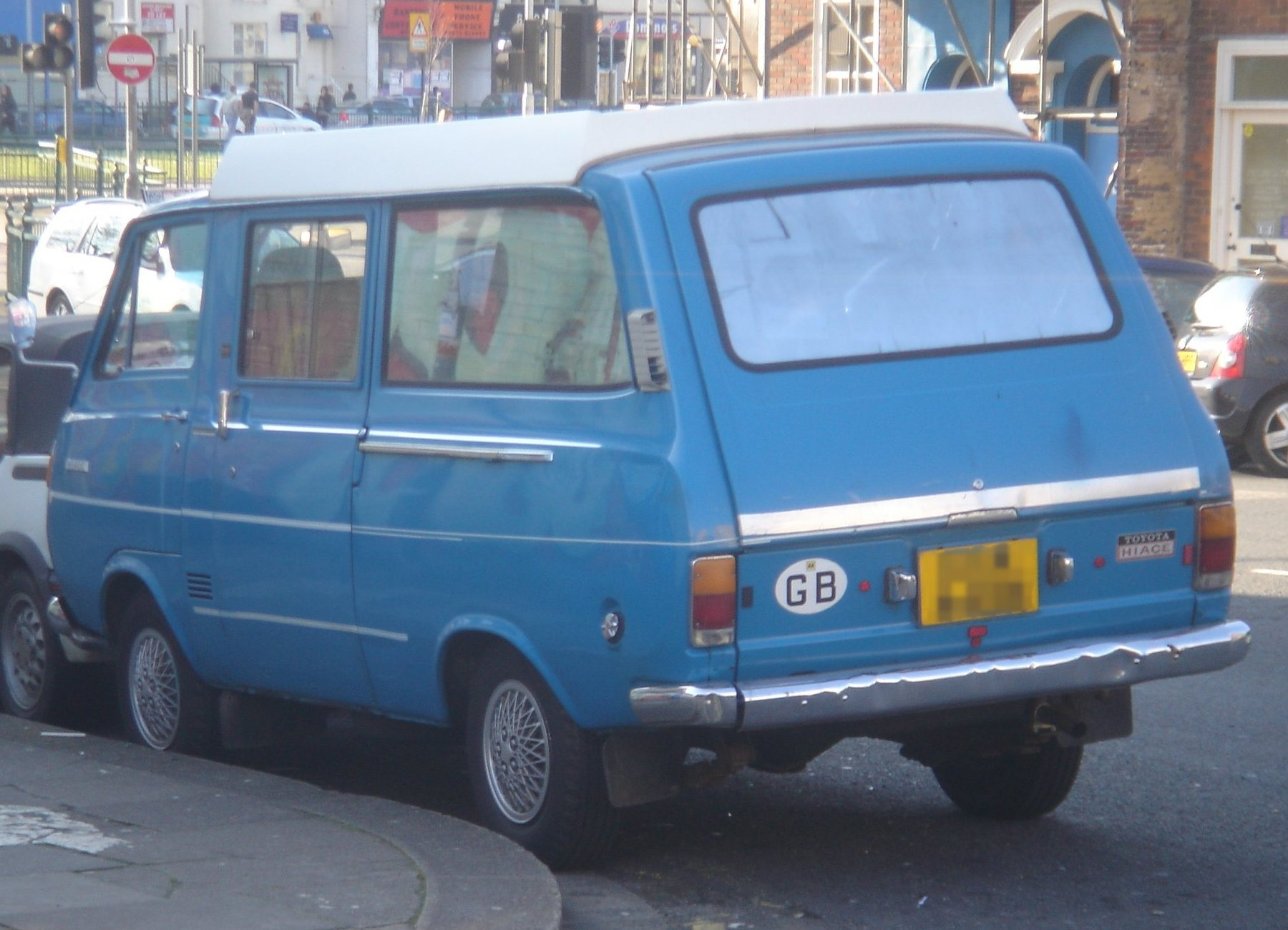
Rear view

In the late 1960s, Toyota Auto Body, a Toyota subcontracting company, led the development of the HiAce as a small van with a one-box design, similar to European ones at the time, but, according to former Toyota senior employee Akira Kawahara, something unseen in the Japanese industry.

Introduced in 1967, the HiAce was offered as a cab over pick-up, delivery van, and a stretched commuter vehicle. It was also called the HiAce Commercial in camper van configuration. It was brought to market two years after the introduction of the Nissan Homy, acquired by Nissan when they assumed operations of the Prince Motor Company. A few engines of different sizes were available upon introduction, ranging from the 70 PS (51 kW) 1.35 to a 83 PS (61 kW) 1.6-litre version. In 1975, the 1.8-litre 16R engine was added. The HiAce was available with a heater, considered a luxury item at the time.

The HiAce was primarily designed as a commuter vehicle, able to transport up to 8 people. With this goal in consideration, the HiAce exterior dimensions and engine displacement were in compliance with Japanese government regulations so as to encourage sales, and accommodate the most passengers by utilizing a cabover body style, with the engine installed underneath and between the front passengers. It was a smaller alternative to the larger Toyota Coaster minibus, and was introduced to Japan after the 1950 Volkswagen Transporter, and the 1961 Chevrolet Greenbrier cabover vans. It was introduced in the same year as the much smaller Toyota MiniAce, which was based on the Toyota Publica, a predecessor to the Toyota Corolla.

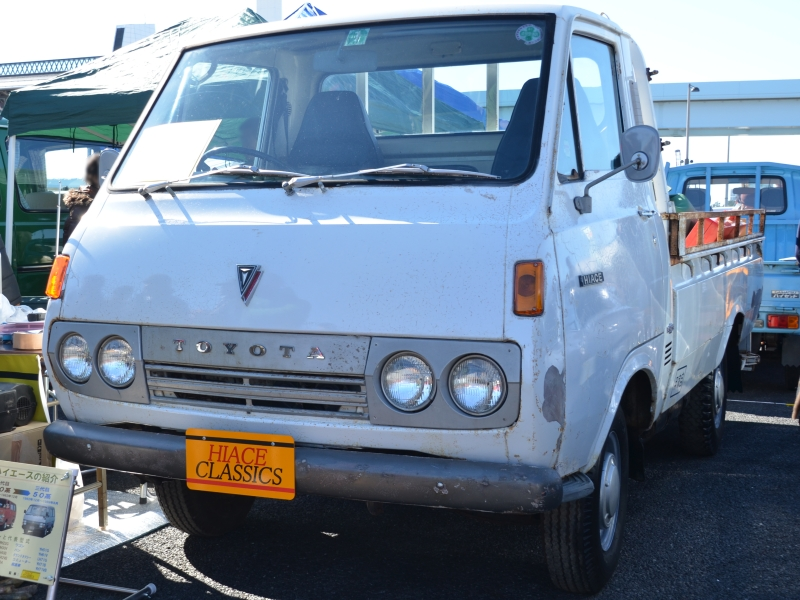
Toyota HiAce series H10 truck

This type of HiAce is a rare model these days mostly because of weather wear and rust. HiAce vans originally sold on the European market have largely been exported to Africa and to Southeast Asia where they are used as public transport vehicles. The first generation Hiace was also sold in Indonesia beginning in August 1975 until late 1979 when the second generation was introduced.

== Second generation (H11/H20/H30/H40; 1977) ==
Second generation
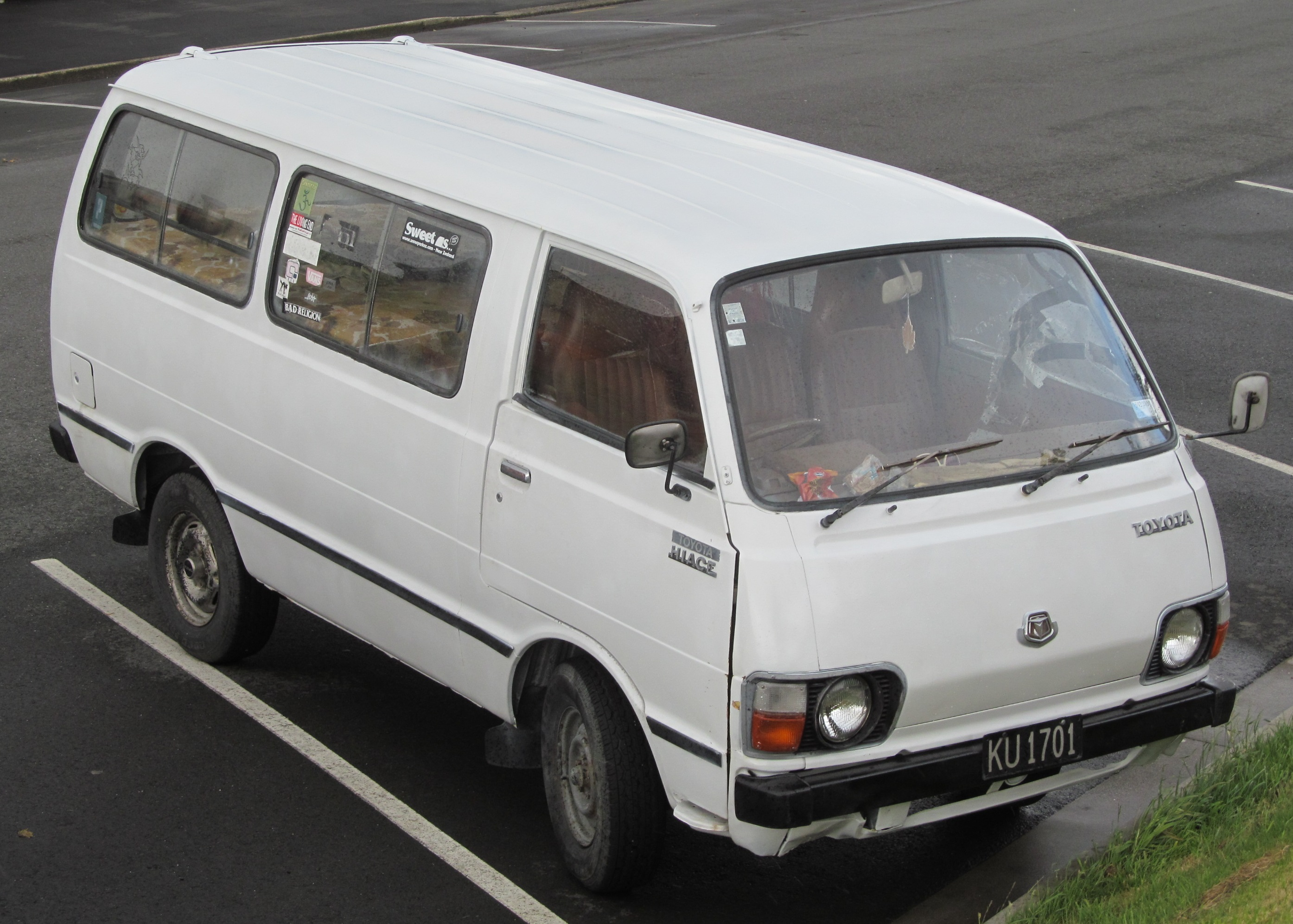

Overview
- Model code: H11; H20; H30; H40
- Also called: Toyota Commuter
- Production: February 1977 – November 1982 (van); February 1977 – May 1985 (truck)
- Assembly: Japan: Kariya, Aichi (Toyota Auto Body); Toyota, Aichi (Honsha plant); Portugal: Ovar (Salvador Caetano); Indonesia: Sunter, Jakarta

Body and chassis
- Body style: 2/4-door pickup; 3/4-door van
- Layout: Front-engine, rear-wheel-drive / four-wheel drive
- Related: Toyota ToyoAce

Powertrain
- Engine: Petrol: 1.6 L (1,587 cc) 12R/12R-J I4 (RH11/20/30/40); 1.8 L (1,808 cc) 16R-J I4 (RH21/31/41); 2.0 L (1,968 cc) 18R I4 (RH22/32/42); Diesel: 2.2 L (2,188 cc) L I4 (LH11/20/30/40)

Dimensions
- Wheelbase: 2,290 mm (90.2 in) (truck, 11-series); 2,340 mm (92.1 in); 2,845 mm (112.0 in) (Super LWB, 40-series)
- Length: 4,340–4,990 mm (170.9–196.5 in)
- Width: 1,690 mm (66.5 in)
- Height: 1,890–2,115 mm (74.4–83.3 in)

Chronology
- Successor: Toyota QuickDelivery (Step van)

The new HiAce of 1977 featured a longer, and more streamlined cab with single headlights. As the second generations dimensions grew, it was joined by a smaller, junior-level cabover van called the Toyota LiteAce to continue to offer dimensions closer to the first generation. In addition to the petrol engines, a 2.2-litre diesel engine was offered in certain markets. New for the "20–40 series" HiAce was a double-cab pick-up, super-long-wheelbase van, and a super long, high-roof Commuter. The Commuter models can seat up to 15 passengers. The short wheelbase truck initially carried the "H11"-series chassis codes. For the vans, 20 series vans have short wheelbases, 30 series have long, and 40 series have super long wheelbases.

After the third generation was introduced in 1982, certain variants of the second generation such as the truck continued to be manufactured for several years. A majority of the second generation models were exported from Europe and Japan to African and Asian countries after production ended and are used as public transport vehicles.

=== Gallery ===
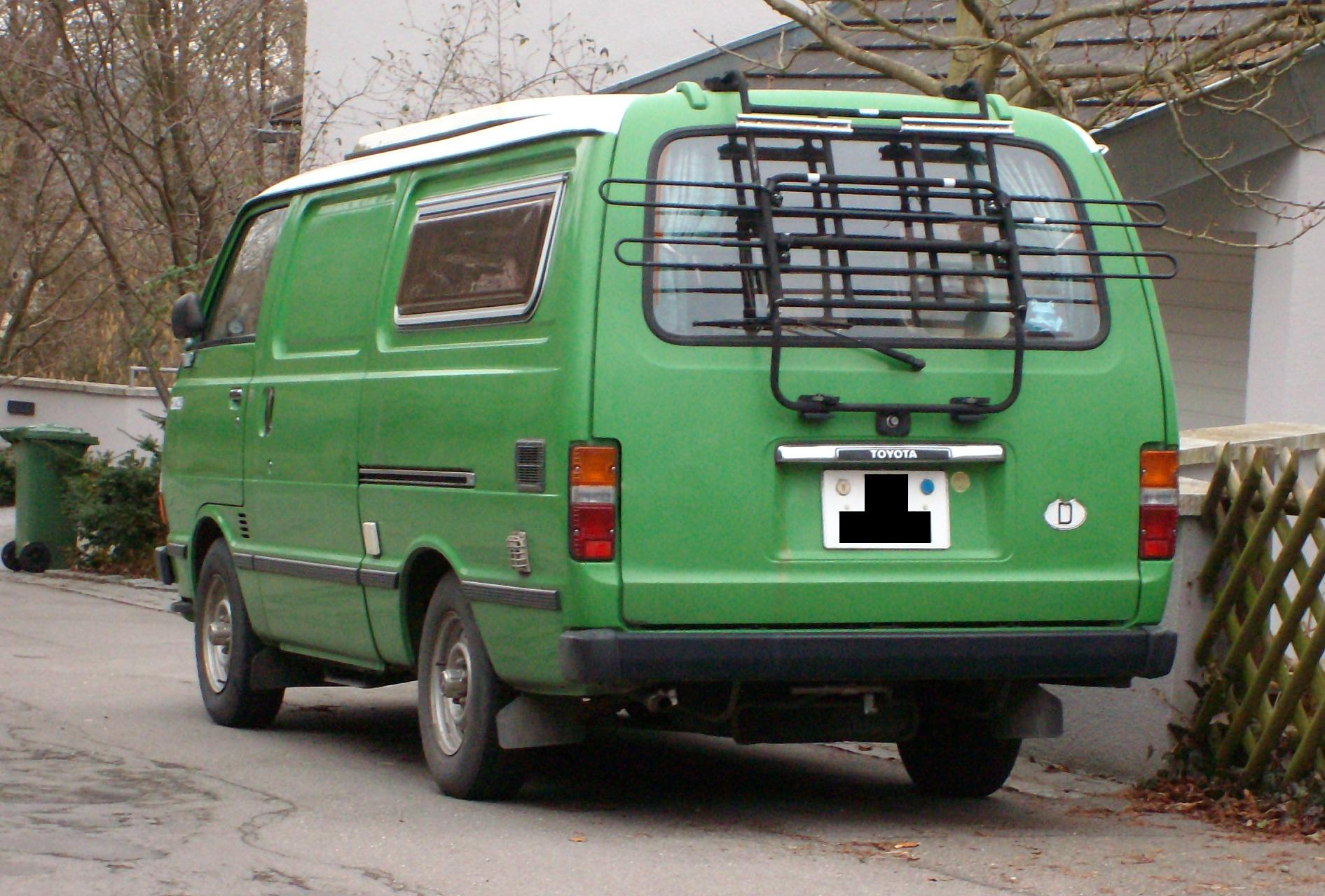
Rear view

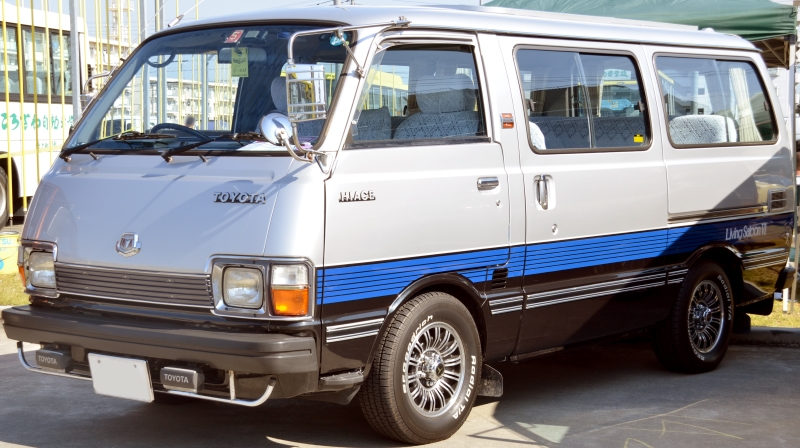
HiAce Living Saloon

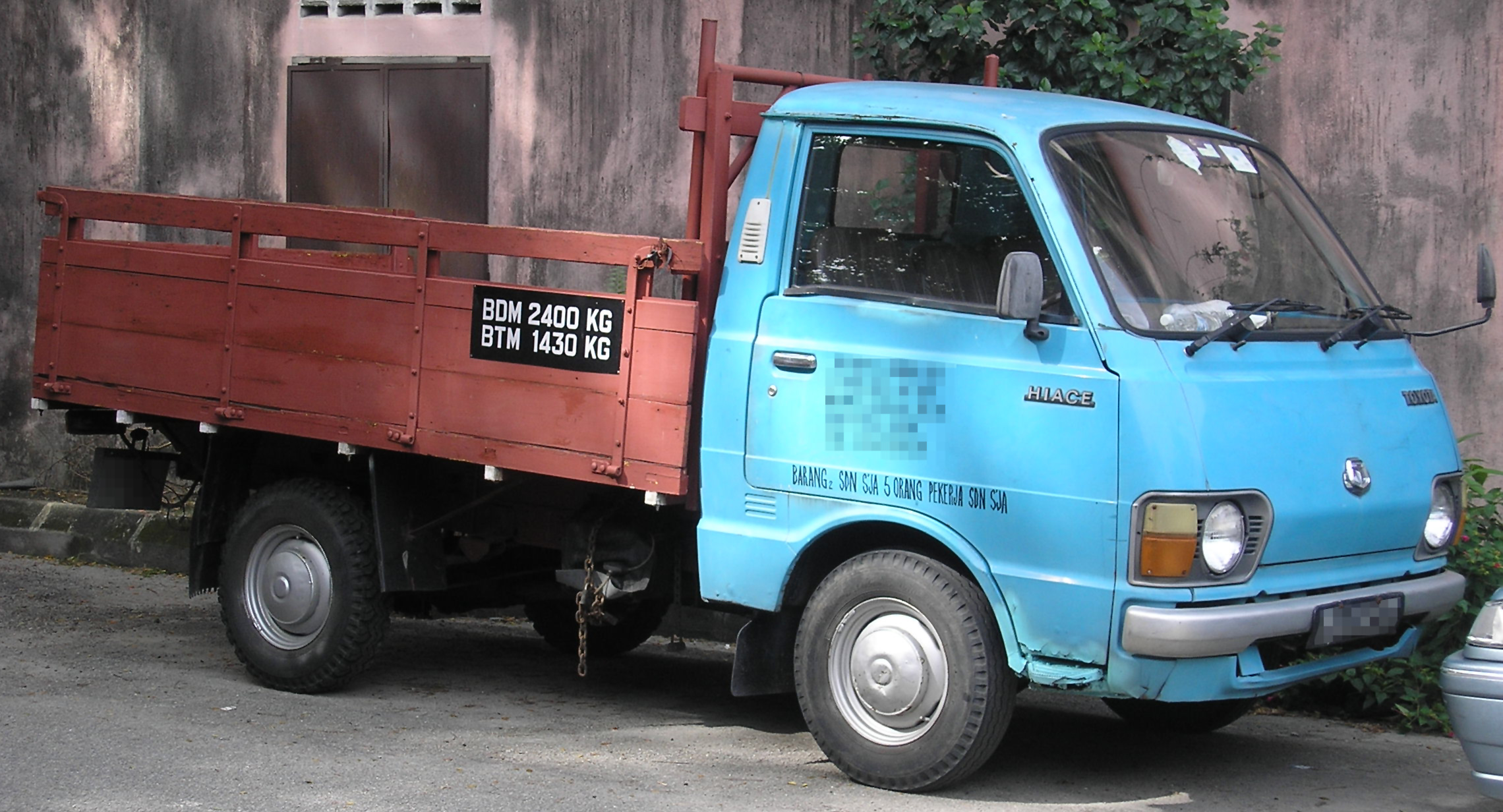
HiAce pickup

== Third generation (H50/H60/H70/H80/H90; 1982) ==
Third generation
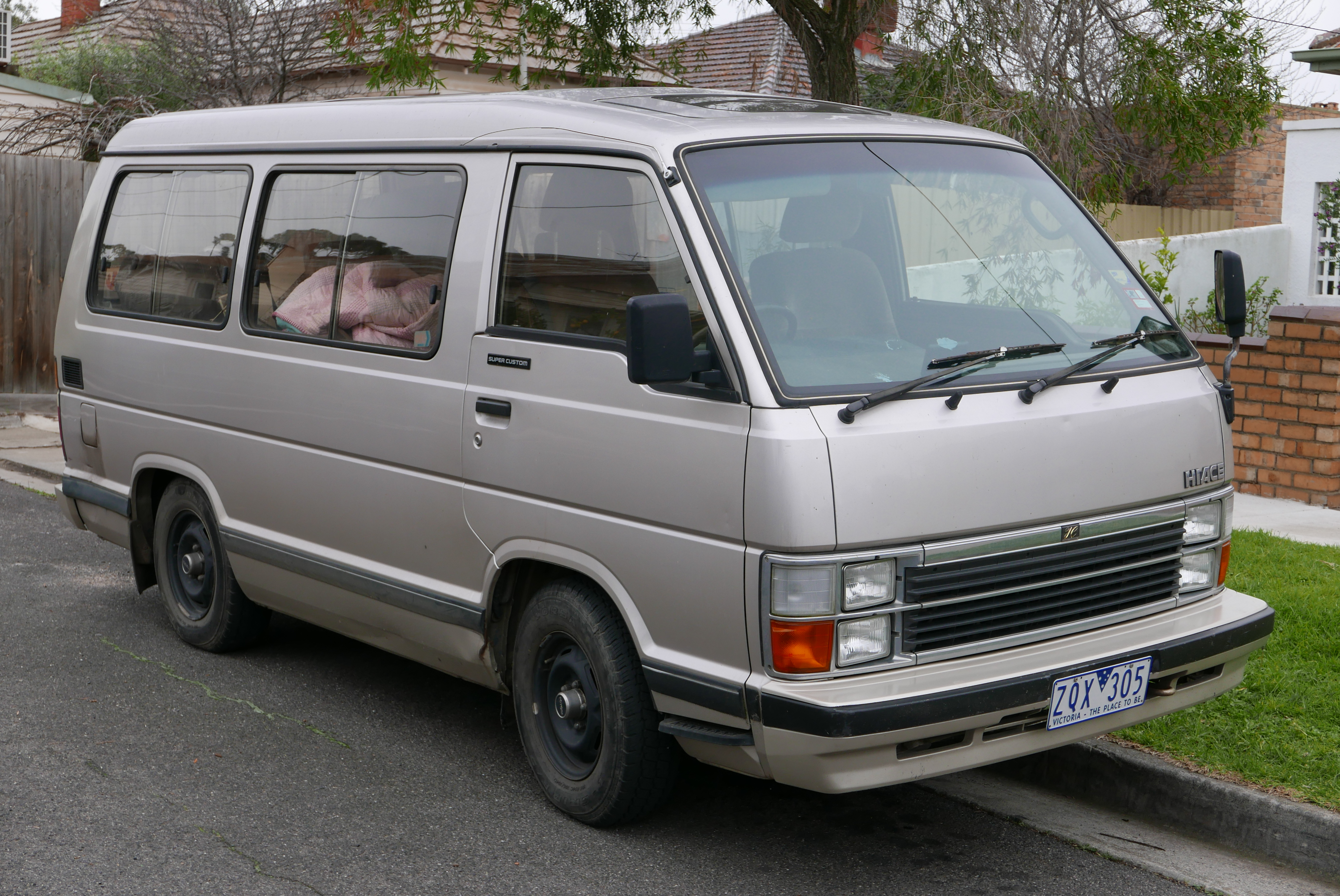
- 1986 Toyota HiAce Super Custom van (H50, first facelift)

Overview
- Model code: H50; H60; H70; H80; H90
- Also called: Toyota Commuter
- Production: December 1982 – October 2007 (H50/H60/H70 vans); June 1985 – August 1995 (H80/H90 trucks)
- Assembly: Japan: Kariya, Aichi (Toyota Auto Body); Toyota, Aichi (Honsha plant); China: Jiangdu, Jiangsu (Nushen); South Africa: Durban

Body and chassis
- Body style: 2-door pickup; 3/4-door van
- Layout: Front-engine, rear-wheel-drive / four-wheel drive
- Related: Toyota ToyoAce; Toyota QuickDelivery

Powertrain
- Engine: Petrol: 1.8 L 2Y I4 (YH50/60/70); 2.0 L 3Y I4 (YH51/61/71); 2.2 L 4Y I4 (YH53/63/73); Diesel: 2.2 L L I4 (diesel; LH50/60/70); 2.4 L 2L I4 (LH51/61/71)
- Transmission: 4-speed automatic; 4-speed manual; 5-speed manual

Dimensions
- Wheelbase: 2,295–2,795 mm (90.4–110.0 in)
- Length: 4,425–5,025 mm (174.2–197.8 in)
- Width: 1,690 mm (66.5 in)
- Height: 1,890–2,220 mm (74.4–87.4 in)

A new HiAce van was launched in 1982, with the HiAce pickup truck coming in August 1985. The truck's cab design was common to the bigger ToyoAce light truck, though it had different frontal styling. The truck was a completely different model than the van.

The van's model number contains various wheelbase specification information: 50 series vans have short wheelbases, 60 series have long, and 70 series have super long. The pickup trucks are in the 80 and 90-series. The Toyota Mobile Lounge, displayed at the 1987 Tokyo Motor Show, is based on the HiAce high-roof Commuter. While the van and Commuter were redesigned in 1989, the pickup truck was produced until the 1995 model year, and was the last HiAce based pickup truck. Air-conditioning was offered as standard equipment on some variants from this generation onwards.

In South Africa, the vehicle continued to be produced and was sold alongside the H200 Toyota Quantum (introduced in 2005) until the end of 2007 when a Taxi variant of the Quantum was introduced.

=== Gallery ===
==== Van/Commuter/Ambulance ====
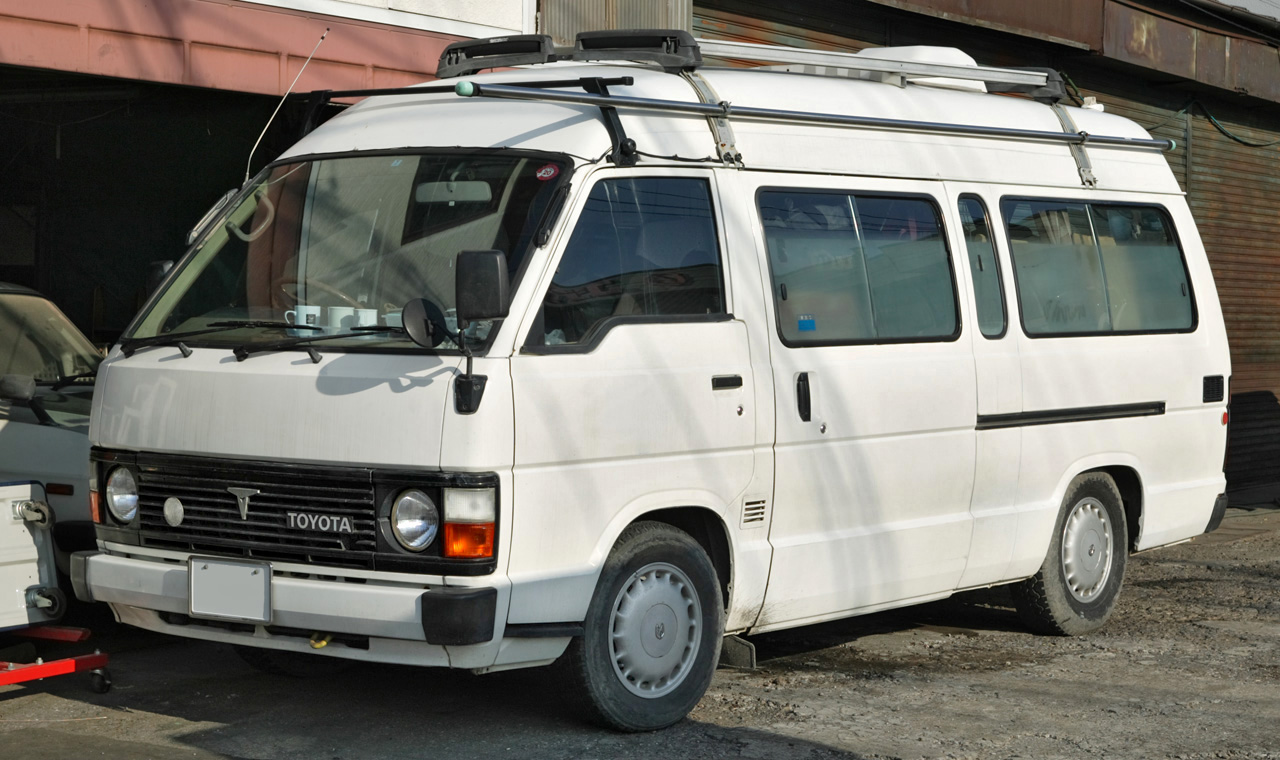
Pre-facelift Toyota HiAce
Commuter / Ambulance / Van super long high roof
(H7#B / H7#V, 1982–1985)

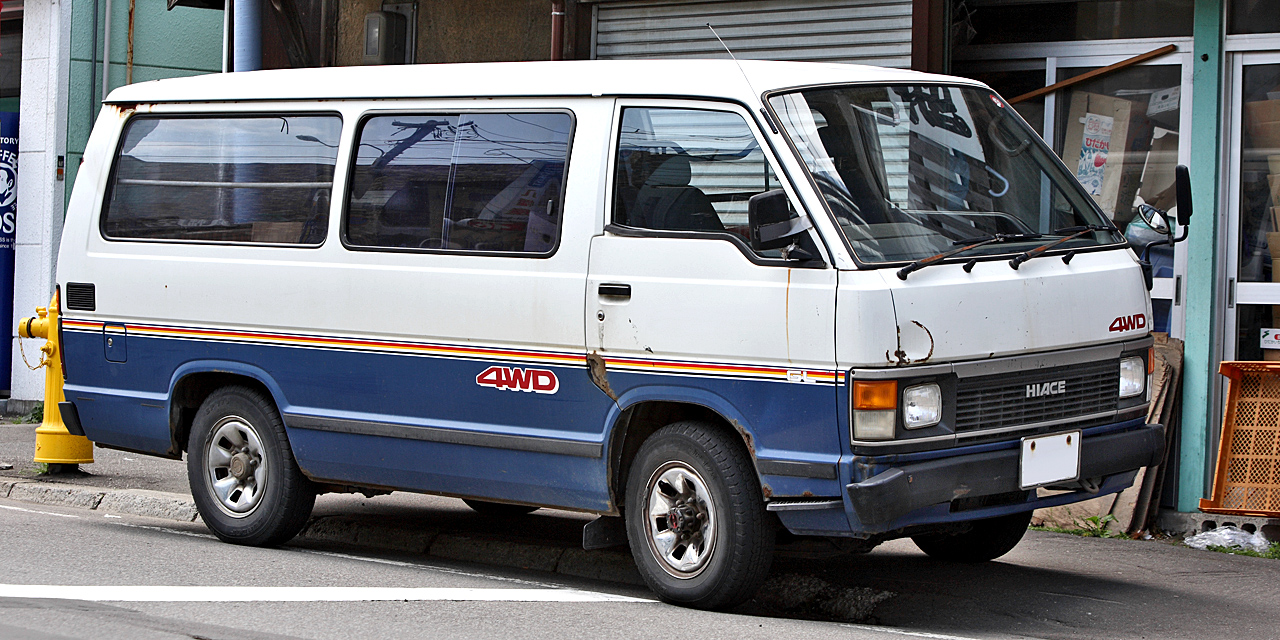
Toyota HiAce
Commuter / Ambulance / Van (H60, facelift)

==== HiAce Wagon ====
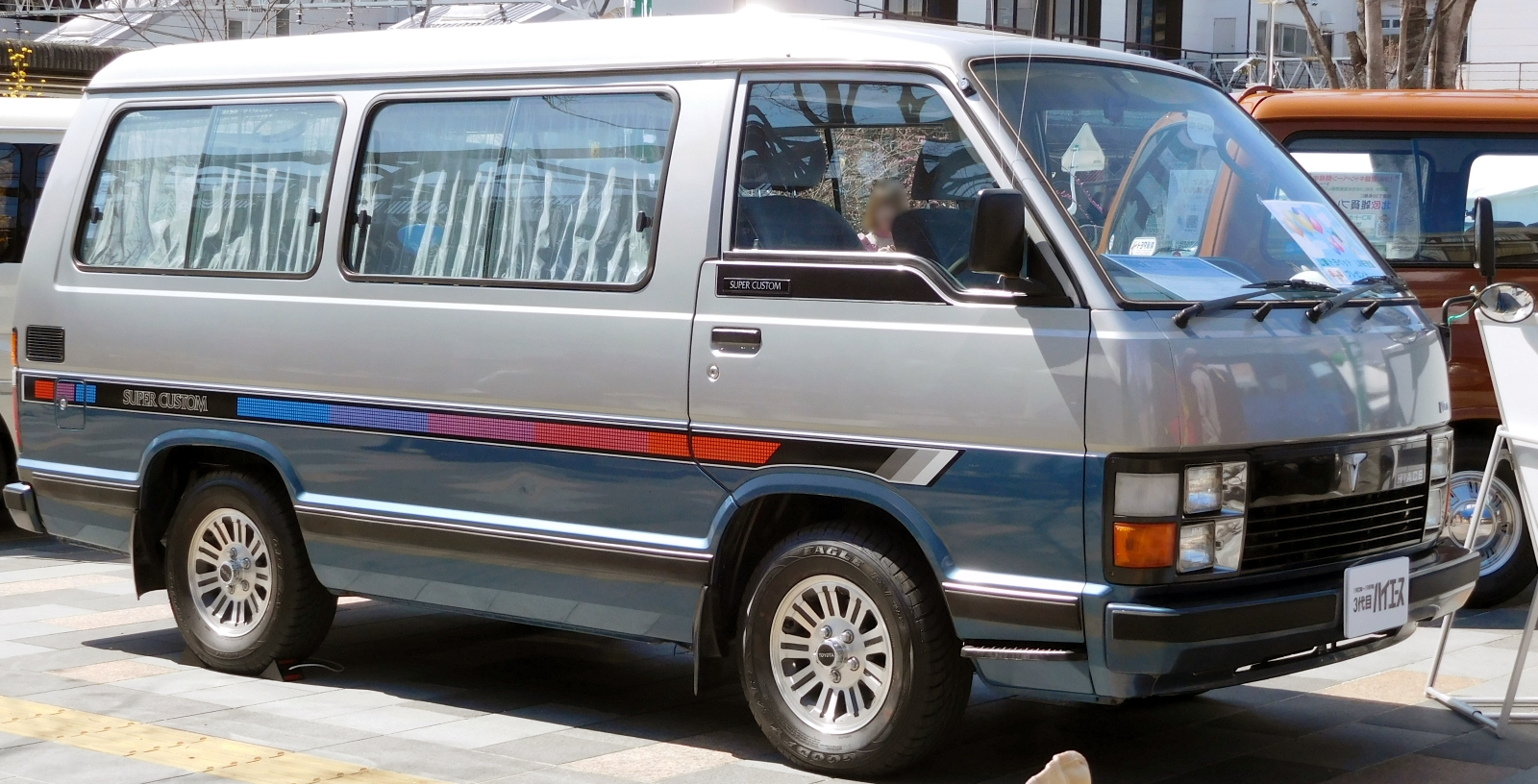
Pre-facelift Toyota HiAce Wagon (H5#G, 1982–1985)

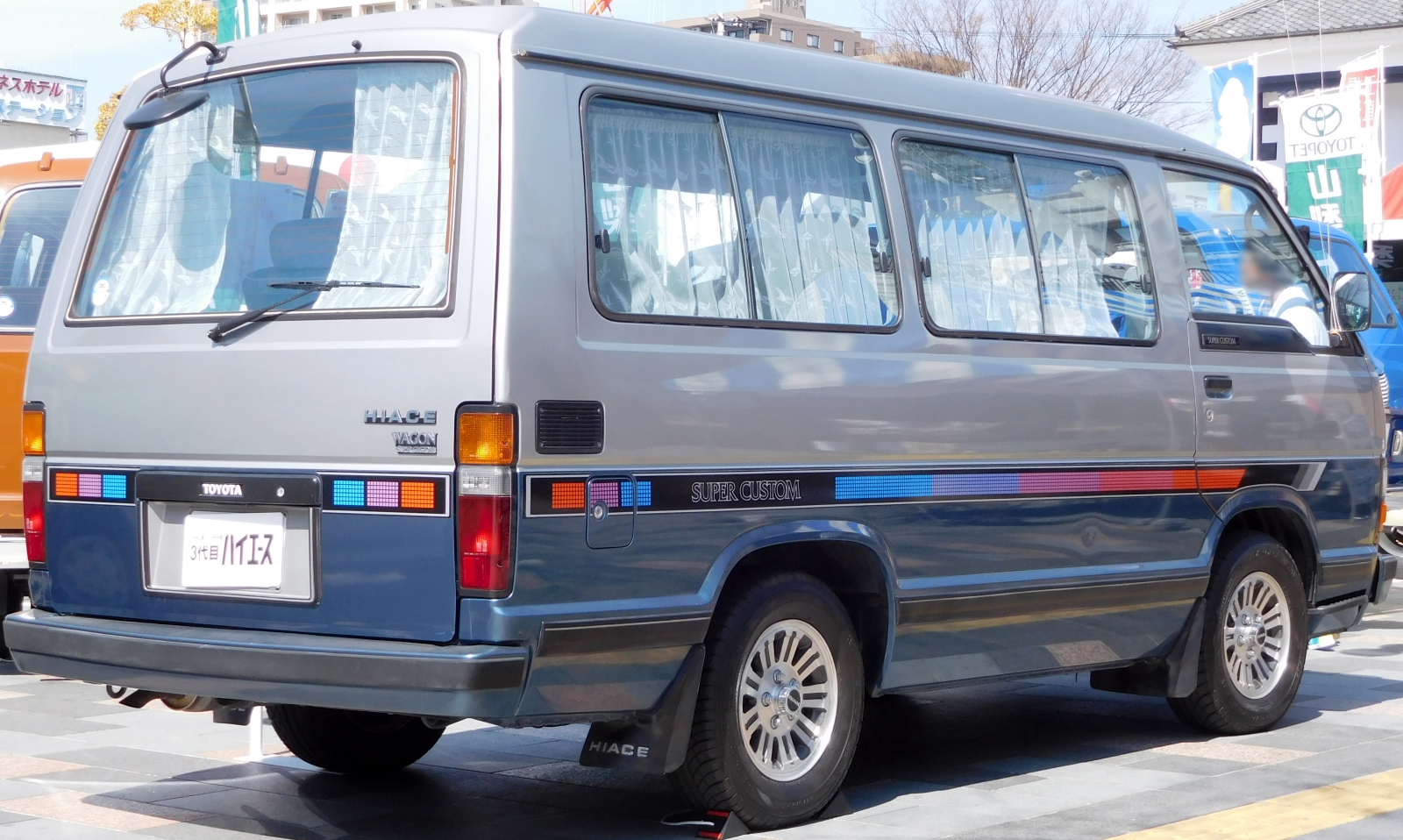
Rear view

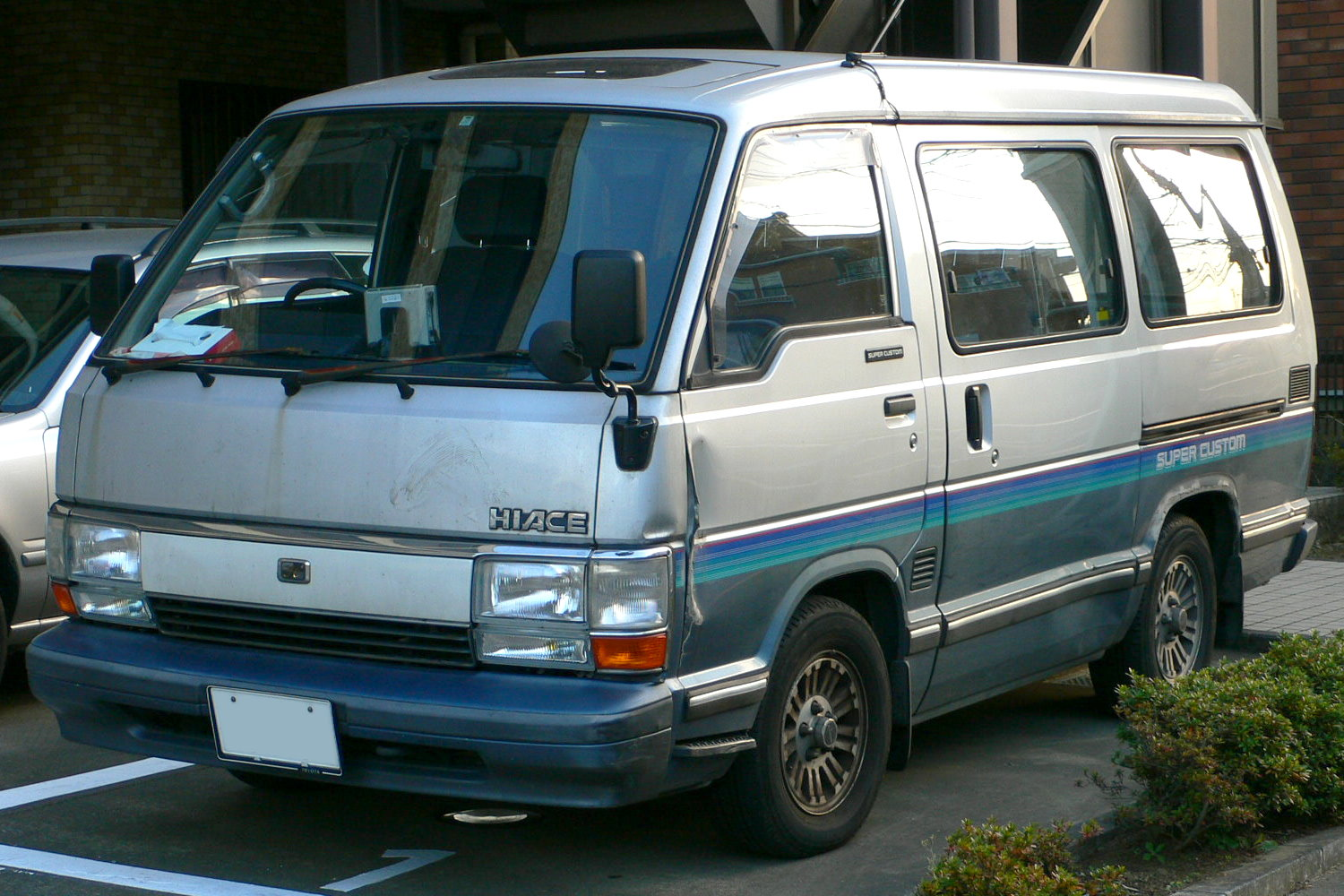
Second facelift Toyota HiAce Wagon
(H5#G, 1987–1989)

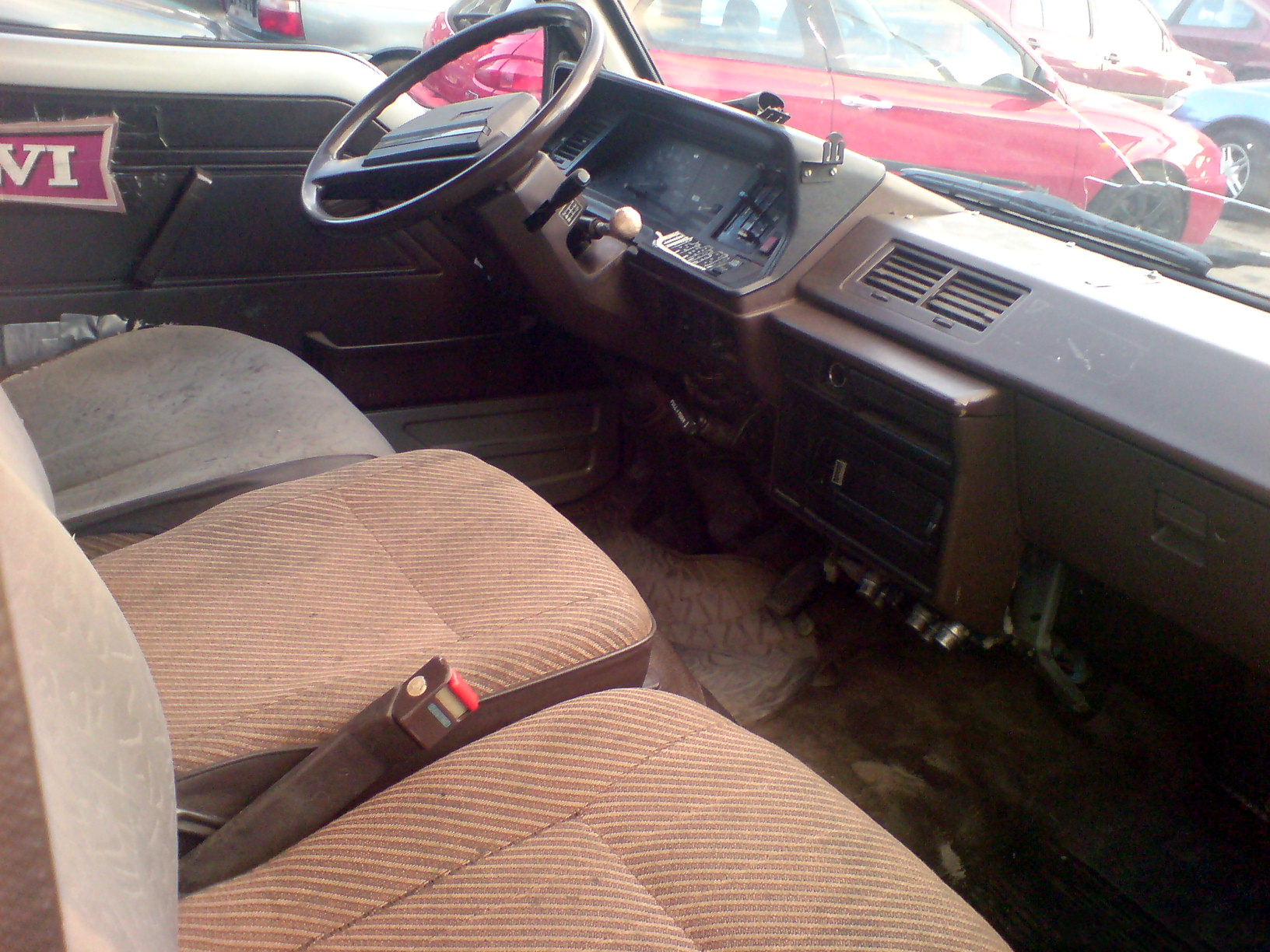
Interior

==== HiAce Truck ====
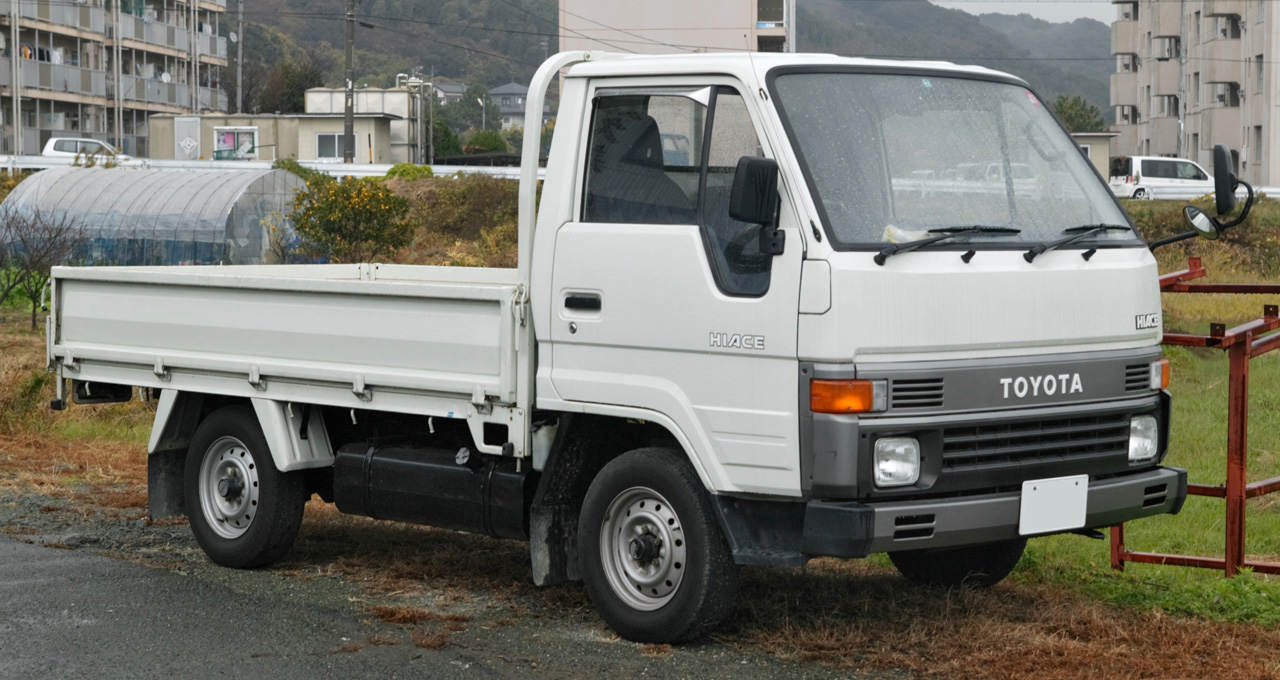
Toyota HiAce Truck
(H8# / H9#, 1985–1995)

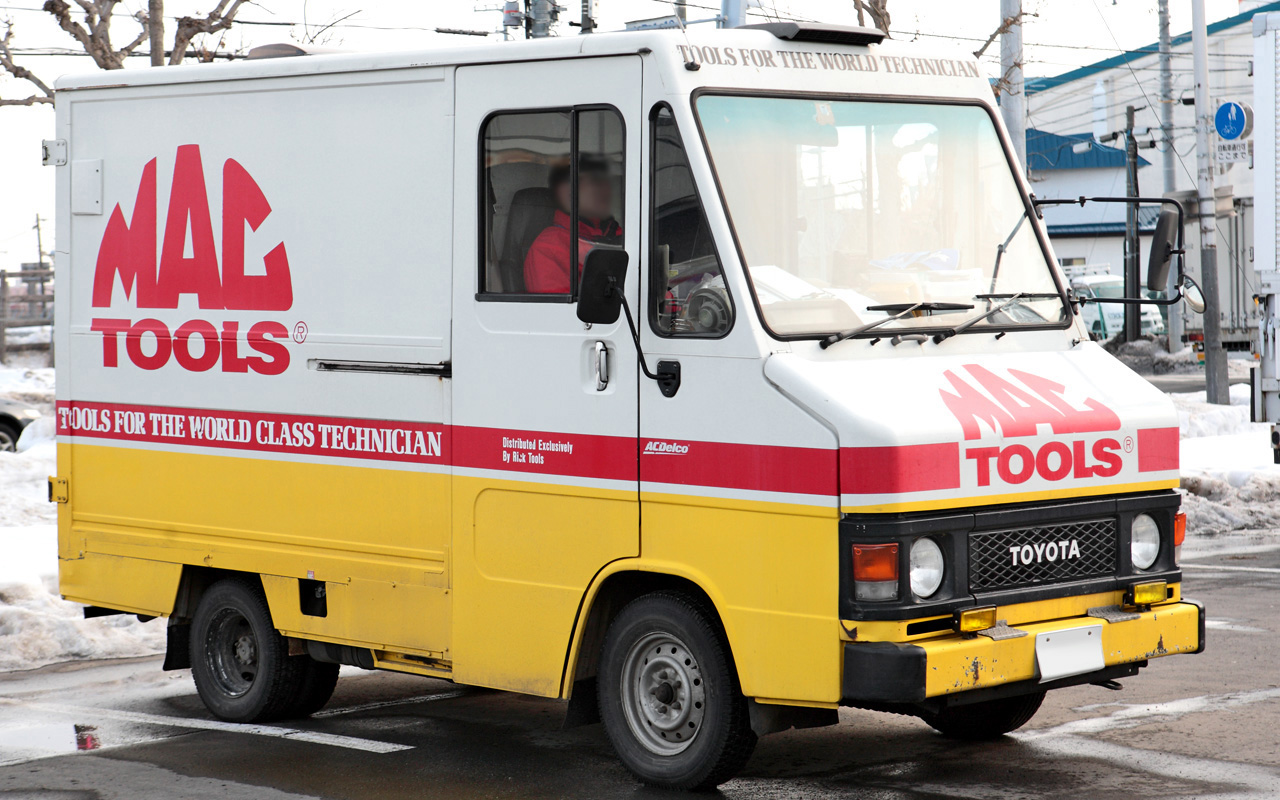
Toyota Hiace QuickDelivery

== Fourth generation (H100; 1989) ==
Fourth generation
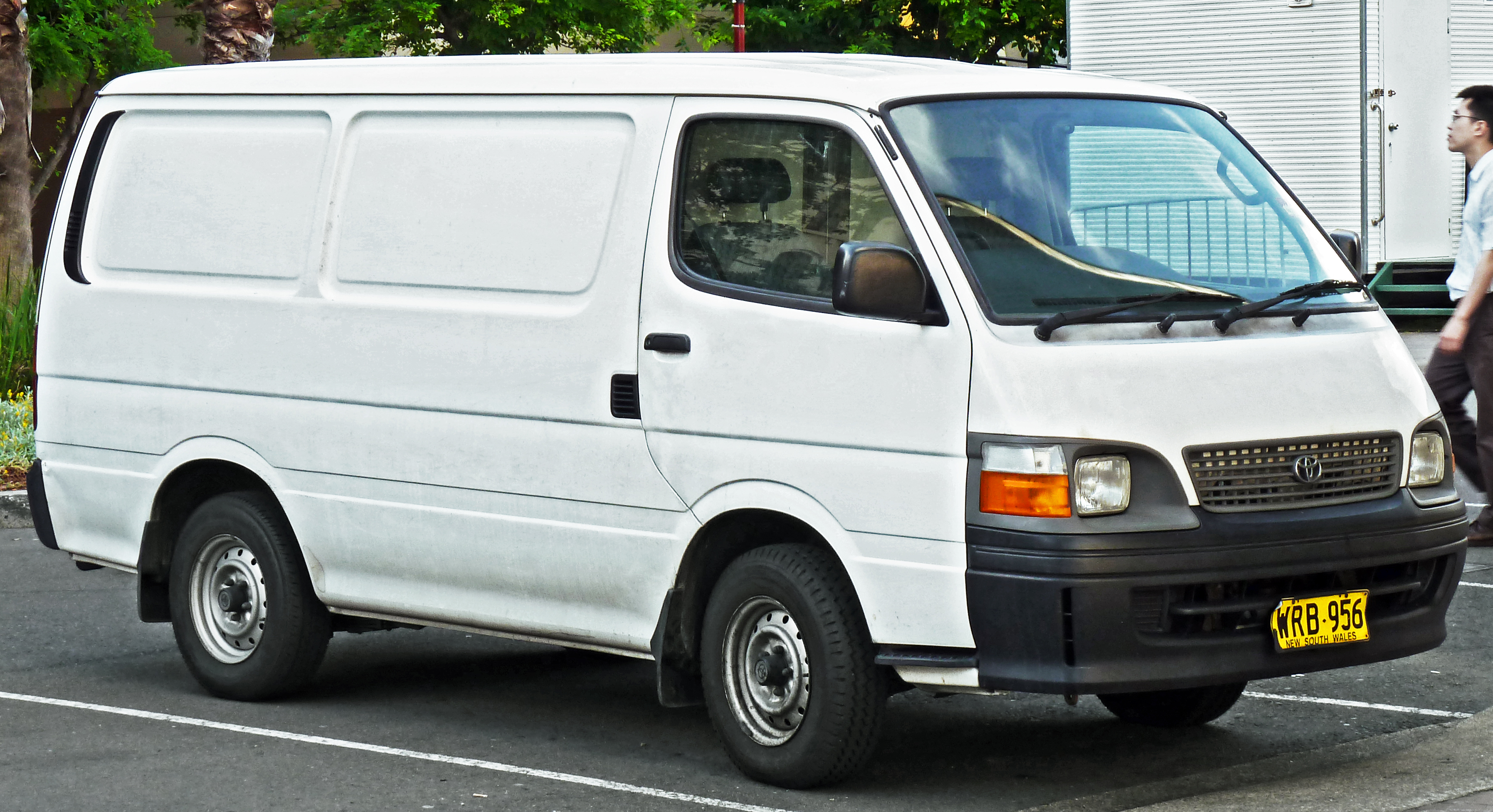
- HiAce Van (RZH103R; second facelift, Australia)

Overview
- Model code: H100 (van); Y100 (truck)
- Also called: Toyota Commuter; Toyota RegiusAce (July 1999 – August 2004); Toyota HiClass; Jinbei Haise (China); King Long Jinwei/ Golden Dragon Haise (China); Lifan LF6470Q/Haise (China)
- Production: August 1989 – August 2004; May 1995 – 2001 (truck)
- Assembly: Japan: Kariya, Aichi (Toyota Auto Body); Inabe, Mie (Toyota Auto Body); Kakamigahara, Gifu (Gifu Auto Body); Toyota, Aichi (Honsha plant); Portugal: Ovar (Salvador Caetano); Malaysia: Shah Alam (ASSB) (1998–2004)

Body and chassis
- Body style: 3/4/5-door van; 2-door truck
- Layout: Front-engine, rear-wheel-drive / four-wheel drive
- Related: Toyota Dyna (Y100); Toyota HiMedic (1992–1997)

Powertrain
- Engine: Petrol: 2.0 L 1RZ/1RZ-E I4; 2.0 L 1TR-FE I4; 2.4 L 2RZ/2RZ-E I4; 2.4 L 4RB2 I4 (Jinbei - China); 4.0 L 1UZ-FE V8 (ambulance); Diesel: 2.4 L 2L-T/2L-TE turbocharged I4; 2.8 L 3L I4; 3.0 L 5L/5L-E I4; 3.0 L 1KZ-TE I4
- Transmission: 4-speed automatic (A45DL, A340E and others); 5-speed manual (G55)

Dimensions
- Wheelbase: 2,330–2,890 mm (91.7–113.8 in)
- Length: 4,430–5,250 mm (174.4–206.7 in)
- Width: 1,695 mm (66.7 in)
- Height: 1,920–2,285 mm (75.6–90.0 in)
- Curb weight: 1,560–2,110 kg (3,439.2–4,651.8 lb)

The fourth generation model appeared in August 1989 and was available in standard wheelbase and long wheelbase variants; a Grand Cabin; standard wheelbase and long wheelbase van; long wheelbase and super long wheelbase high roof van. The latter shares a body design with the Commuter, which is a 15-seat minibus.

A range of engines were available in the fourth-generation vehicles, ranging from 2.0-litre petrol engines to 3.0-litre turbo-diesel engines. The 2.4-litre turbo-diesel engine (2L-T) was updated to the electronically controlled 2L-TE in October 1990. Most versions are rear-wheel drive, but part time or full-time four-wheel-drive versions were sold depending on specification level and market. Four-wheel drive models were initially only available with the 2.8-litre 3L diesel engine in the Japanese market, but export markets received petrol options as well. The base model is typically the DX. Upmarket versions included GL, Super GL, Super Custom and Super Custom Limited models.

The facelifted fourth-generation HiAce was launched in August 1993. At this time, the new 3-litre 1KZ-TE turbodiesel replaced the 2L-TE and 3L diesels in HiAce Wagons (passenger car registration) in Japan. The HiAce received a facelift again during 1997 and once more in 2002. In Japanese-market commercial HiAces the 2.8-litre 3L engine was replaced by the larger 5L engine in August 1998, in order to meet stricter emissions standards. The 1TR-FE engine was also introduced in September 2003. Export models were available with a range of different engines to suit local importers, uses, and tax structures.

In the Philippines, the HiAce was first sold in August 1990 with a diesel engine. The vehicle got revamped in October 1994 before it was launched in 1995. It was revamped again in May 1997 for sale as both a business vehicle and as a family vehicle. The HiAce was then available in two respective variants; the business-oriented 15-seater and the family van-oriented 13-seater. In March 1999, the HiAce 3.0 Grandia and 2.0 GL petrol HiAce variants were launched, as well as the HiAce Commuter, a HiAce meant for business, and the HiAce was facelifted again in that year. In September 2000, the top-of-the-line 3.0 inline-4 diesel HiAce Super Grandia was launched. All came with a standard 5-speed manual transmission. These variants were all sold until June 2005, with the next generation being launched in June of that same year. A special edition HiAce Super Grandia J (Japan edition) was also sold together with the RAV4 J and Revo J from August 2002 to June 2003.

In the UK market, the H100 Hiace was introduced in November 1989 with either a 2.0 1RZ petrol engine developing 74 kW at 5400 rpm and 165 Nm at 2600 rpm or the 2.4L 2L-II diesel developing 57 kW at 3900 rpm and 162 Nm at 2400 rpm. A short wheelbase variant called the Hiace Compact was introduced in 1994 as a replacement for the Liteace van.

A special model intended to be used as an emergency medical vehicle known as the Toyota HiMedic, was launched in May 1992 with sales commencing from June of the same year. It used a 4.0-litre V8 engine shared with the Celsior. Production was discontinued in 1997 and replaced with Himedic based on the XH10 Granvia.

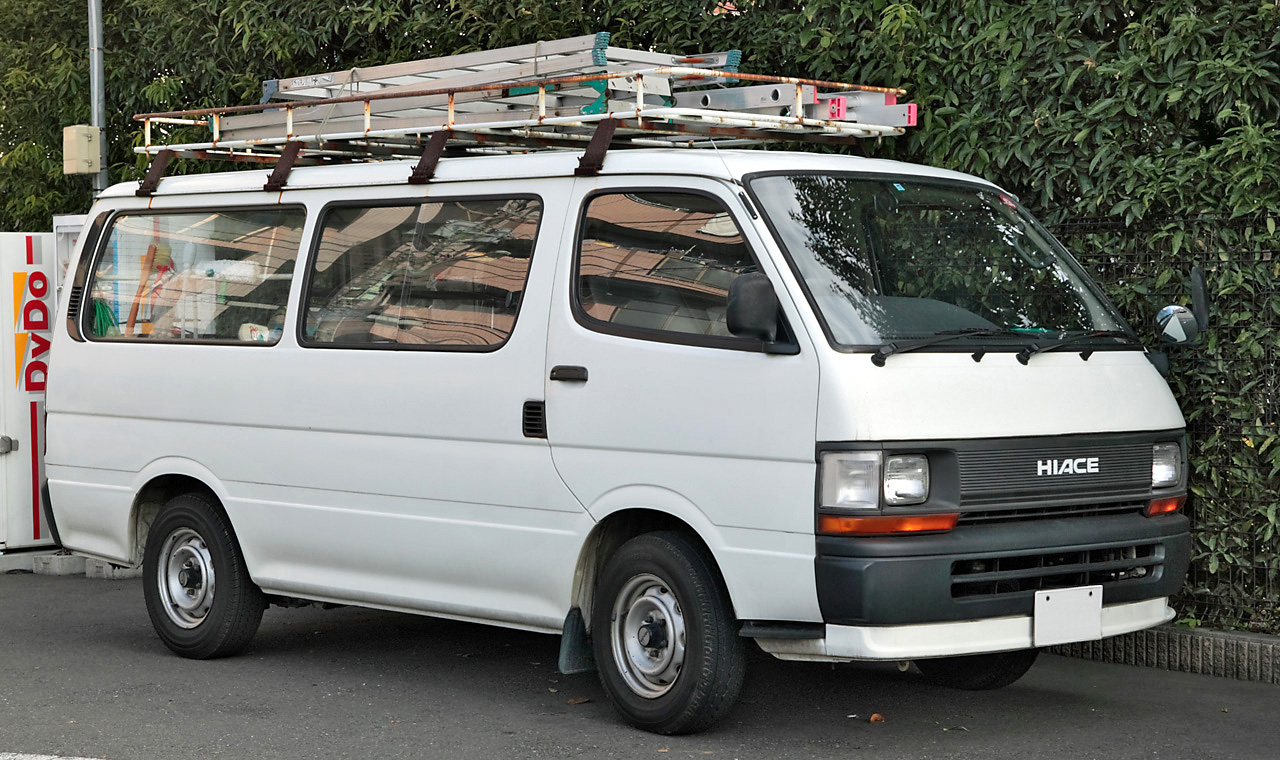
Long Van 2.0 DX (RZH112V; pre-facelift, Japan)

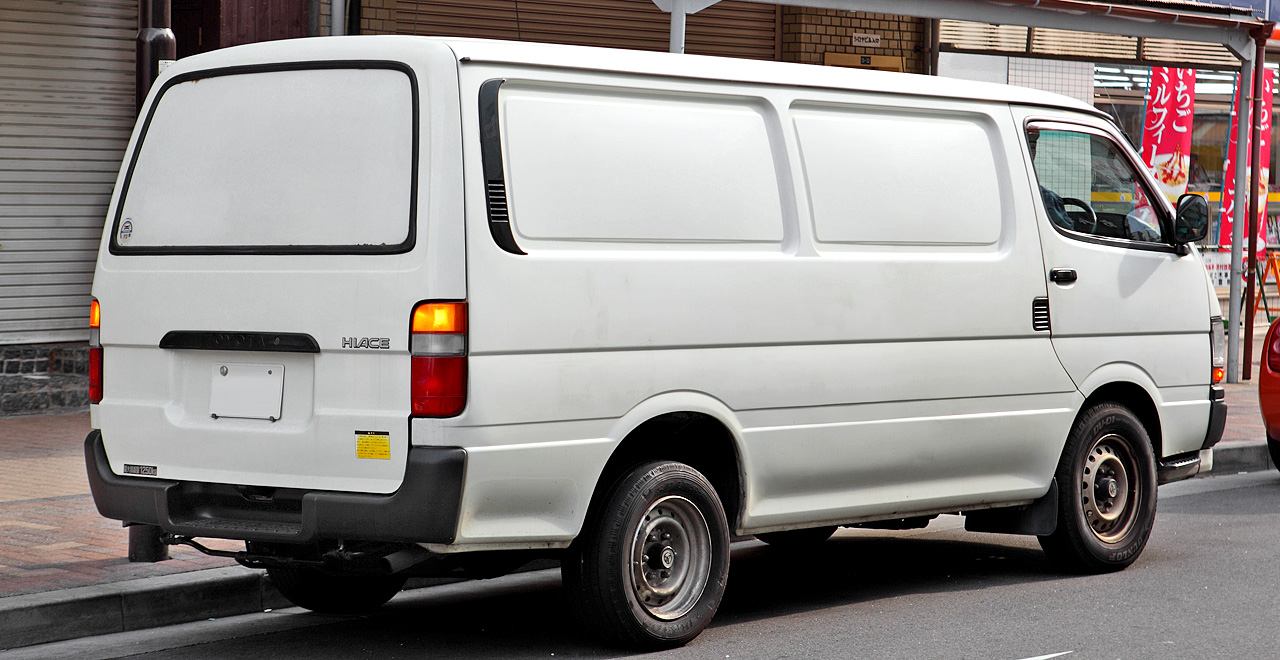
Long Route Van CD (LH172V, Japan)

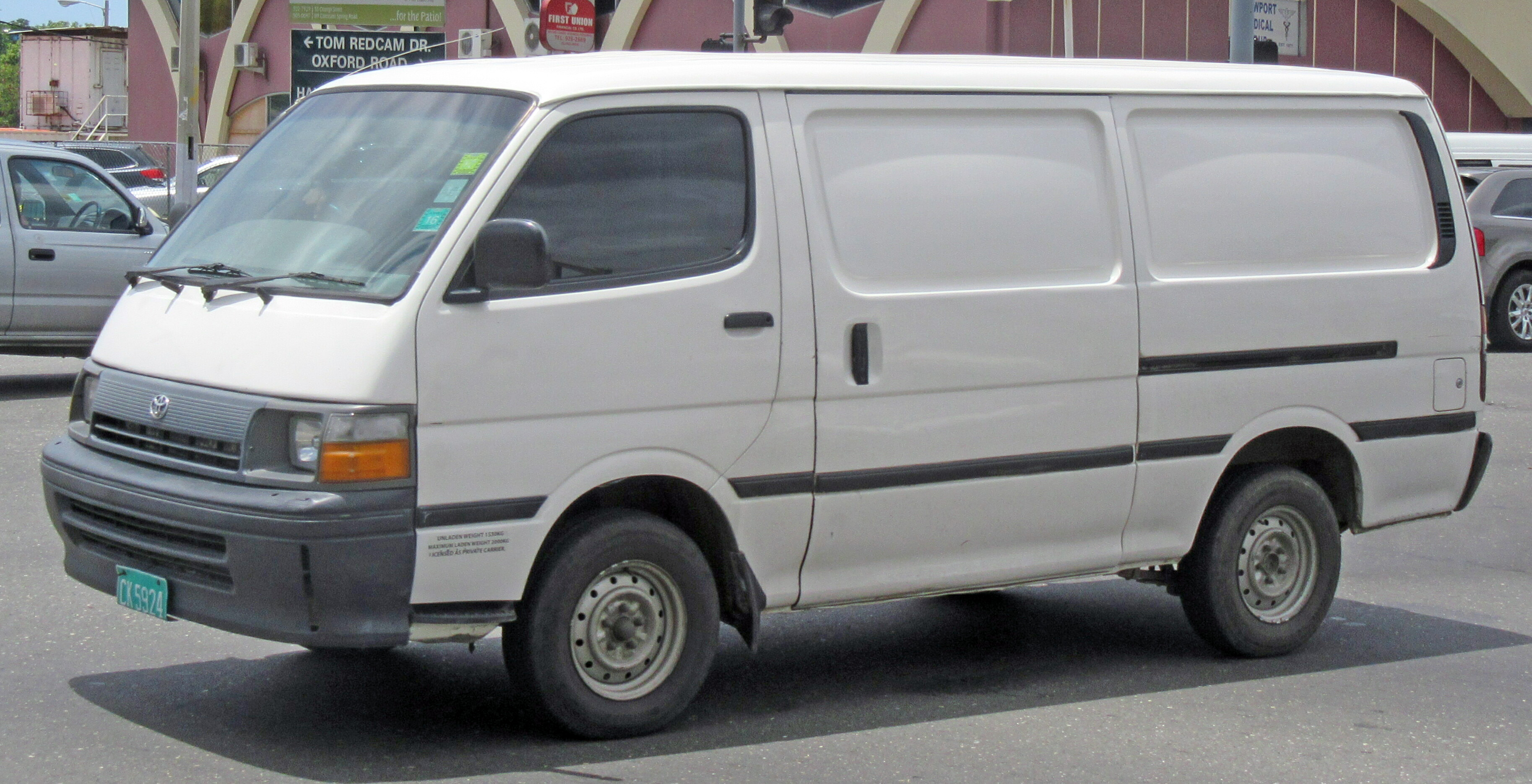
Long Van (first facelift)

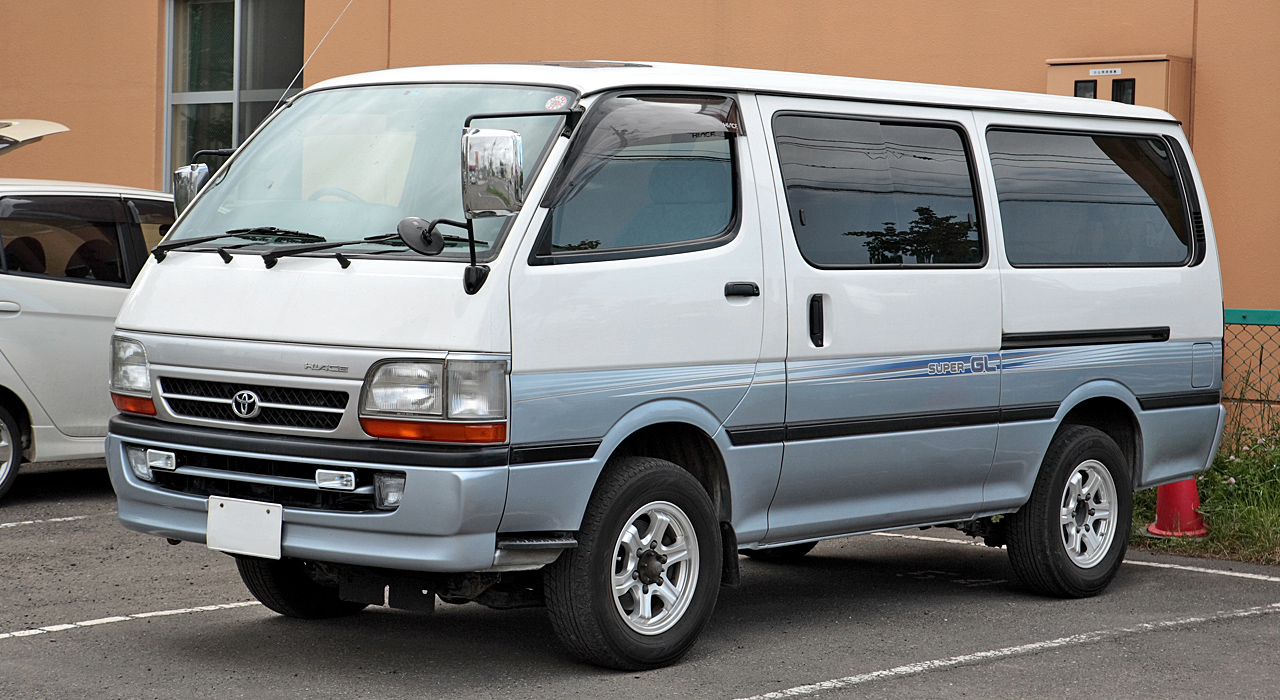
Long Van Super GL (LH178V; second facelift, Japan)

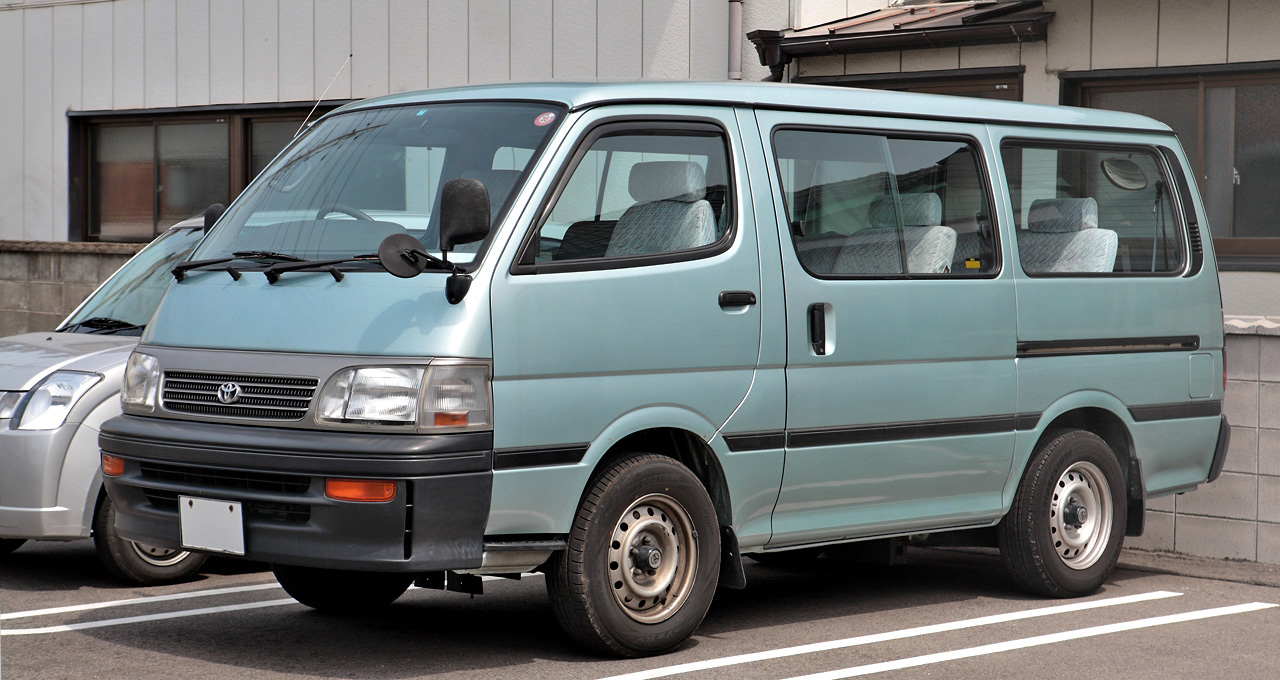
Wagon 3.0DT Custom (KZH100G; first facelift, Japan)

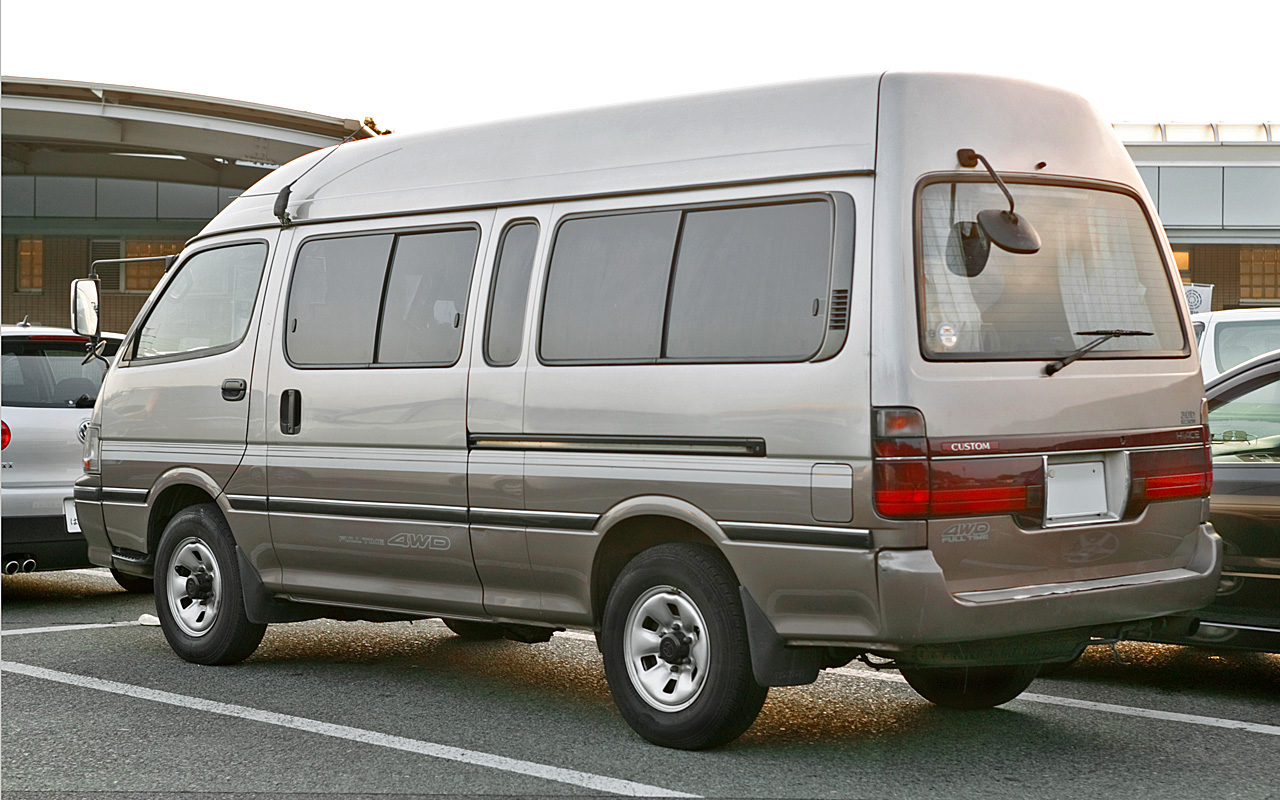
Wagon 3.0DT Super Long Custom 4WD (KZH126G; first facelift, Japan)

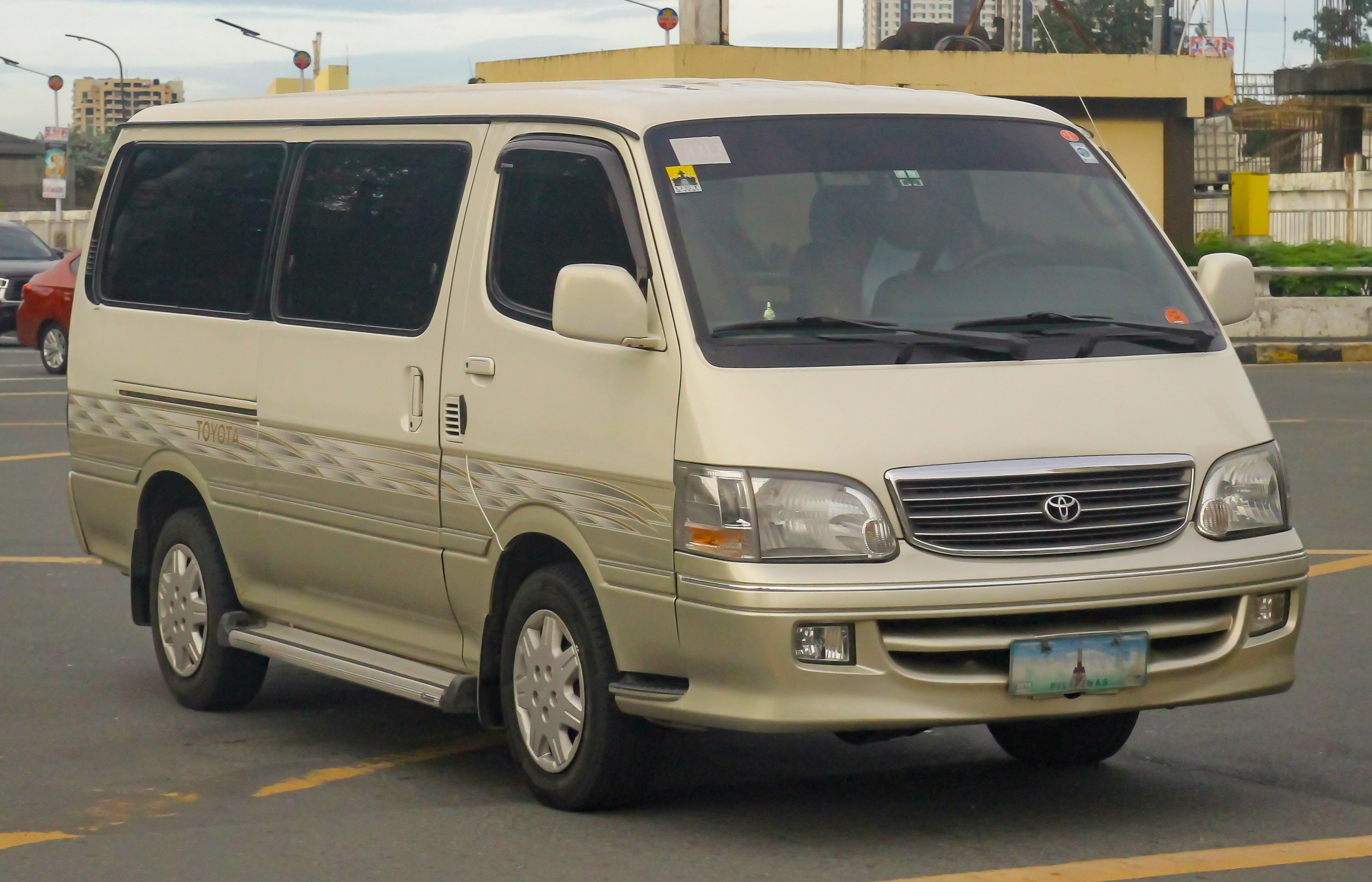

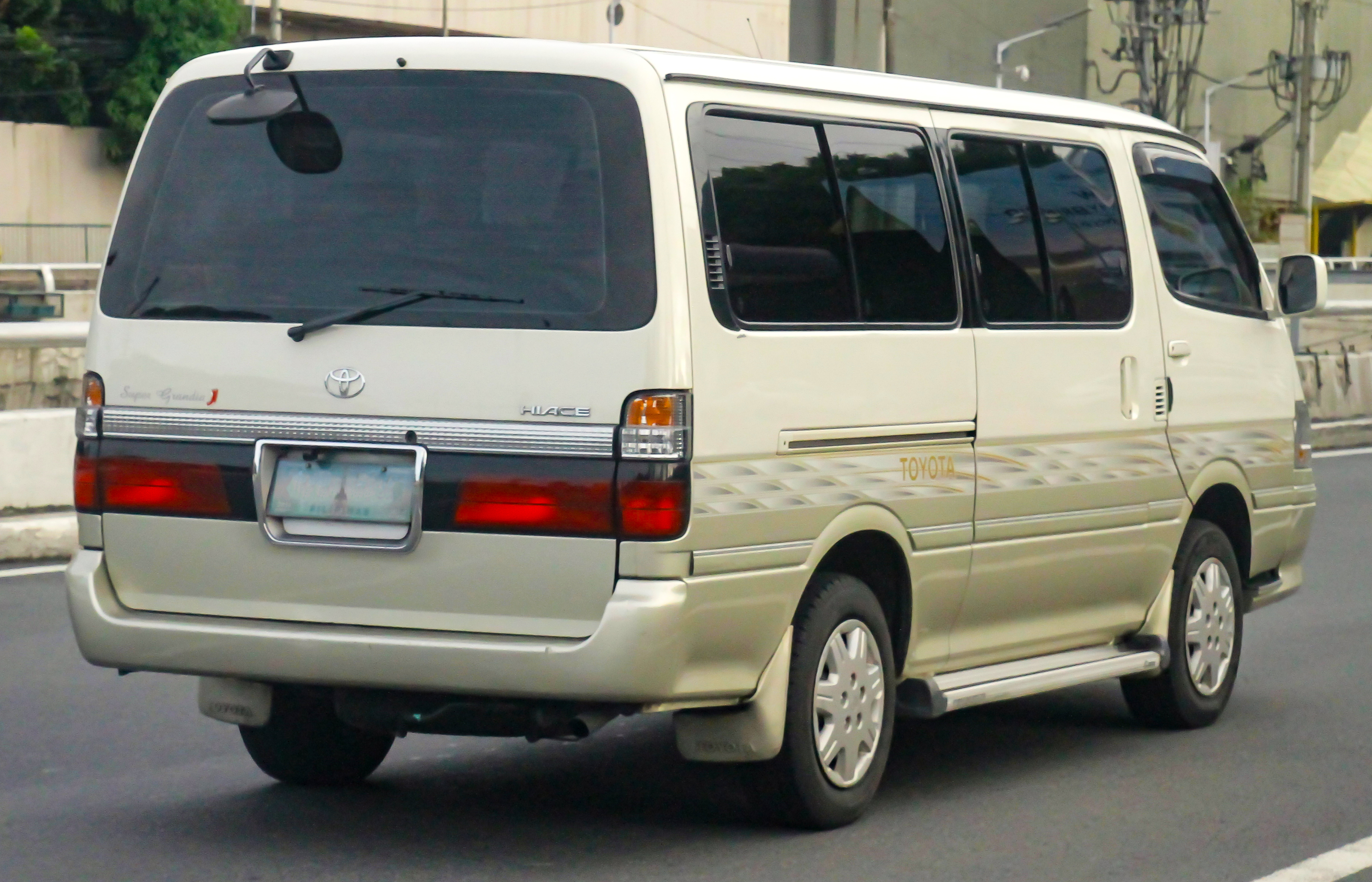
Wagon 3.0 Super Grandia J (third facelift, Philippines)

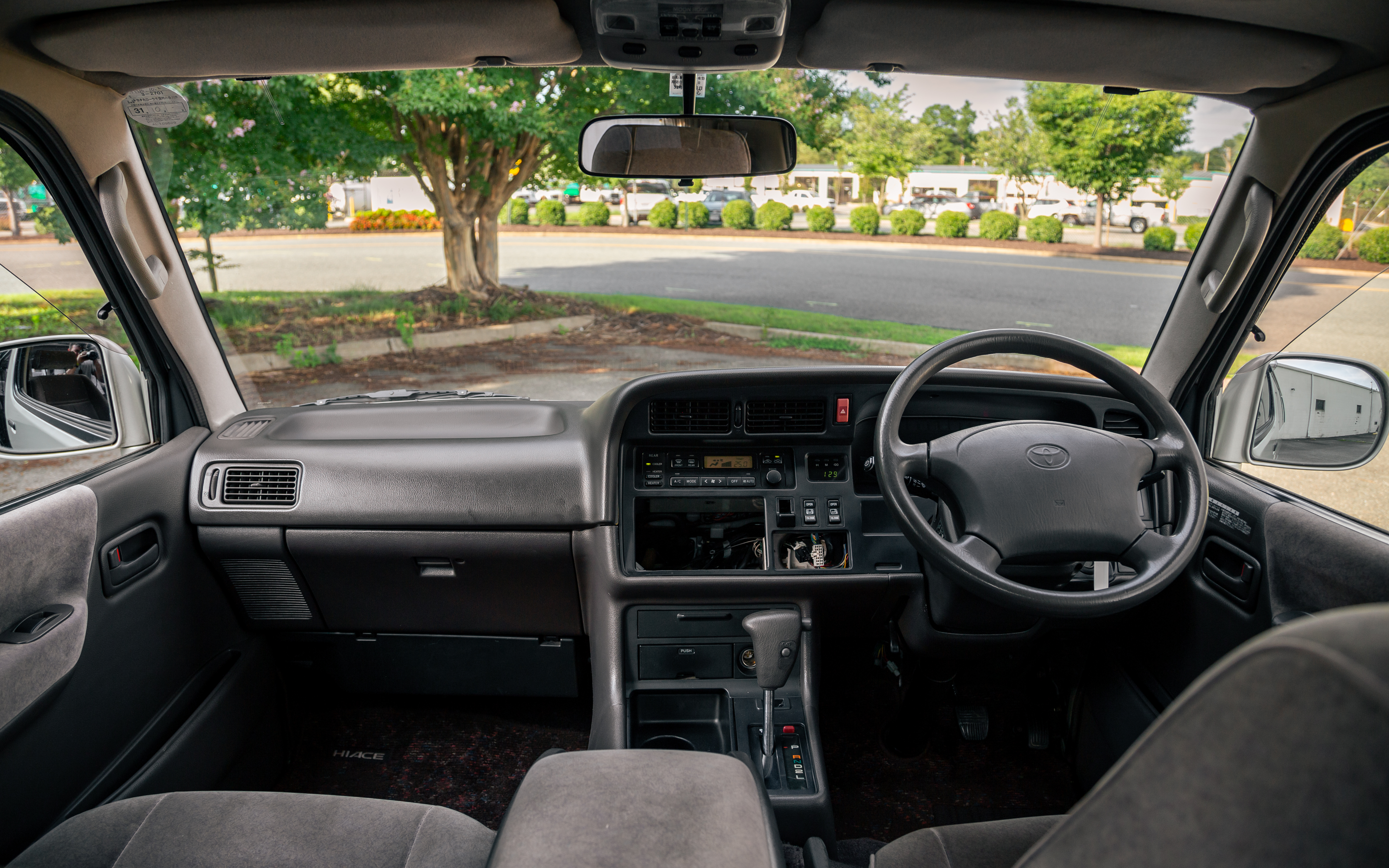
Interior

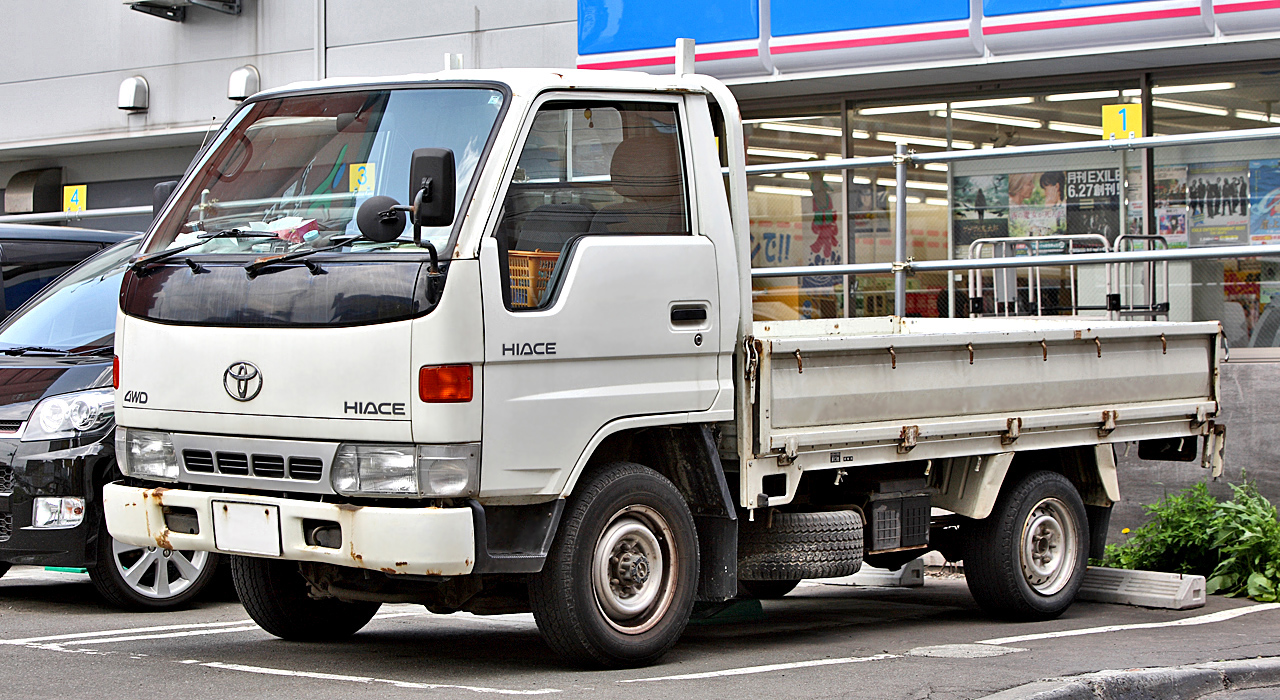
Hiace Truck (Y100)

=== RegiusAce ===
The HiAce was rebadged with a luxury orientation, called the Toyota RegiusAce. It was introduced in August 1999 with different versions called the Regius HiAce and Regius Touring HiAce sold at Toyopet and Vista dealerships. The RegiusAce uses a cab-over layout, where the front seat passengers sit above the front axle and the engine is beneath the floor, between the front passengers. 4wd models had an additional 100mm ground clearance.

When the Vista sales network was replaced by the NETZ sales network, the RegiusAce was sold exclusively at the Netz Store. The H100 series RegiusAce was manufactured between 1999 and 2004.

=== China ===
The HiAce (H100) also remains popular in China, where it is still produced by several Chinese vehicle manufacturers such as Jinbei Motors as the Jinbei Haise since 1991, King Long Motors since 1995 as the Golden Dragon XML6532, Lifan Industry Group as the Lifan LF6470Q/Haise since 2005 to 2008, and the Foton View C1 since 2000. These are exported to several markets, including Chile, and are also assembled in both Egypt (by Bavarian Auto Group) and Sri Lanka (as the Micro MPV J). Common engines found in Chinese HiAce variants are the 2.0 and 2.2-litre (491Q-ME) petrol engines and the 2.8-litre 4JB1 diesel engine. A Chinese variant of the 2.4 L 2RZ-E engine is also available known as the 4RB2.

Other petrol engines such as the V19 (2 litre), 4G20C (2 litre) and the 4G22 (2.2 litre), as well as 2.5 and 2.7-litre diesel engines, have also been available in China. As of 2019, the 2006 variant of the Jinbei Haise was still available for purchase with the 4G20, 4G21 and V19 petrol engines available as standard. In 2025, the Jinbei Haise was given an engine update with the 2 litre 1TZS four cylinder engine available as standard with the 5 speed manual transmission. It was sold as the Express King Short Axle Cargo, Express King Long Axle Cargo, and Express King Deluxe 10-seater. An electric version is also available as part of their New Energy series debuting alongside its Haise King counterpart.

Since its introduction, the Jinbei HiAce has spanned over six generations in which five of those were facelifts with the first occurring in 1999, two separate ones in 2002, the third in 2006 which remains the popular version to date under Jinbei, and the fourth and most recent in 2008 which was later discontinued.

=== Granvia, HiAce Regius, Grand HiAce, Touring HiAce (XH10, XH20) ===
Toyota HiAce (XH10/XH20)
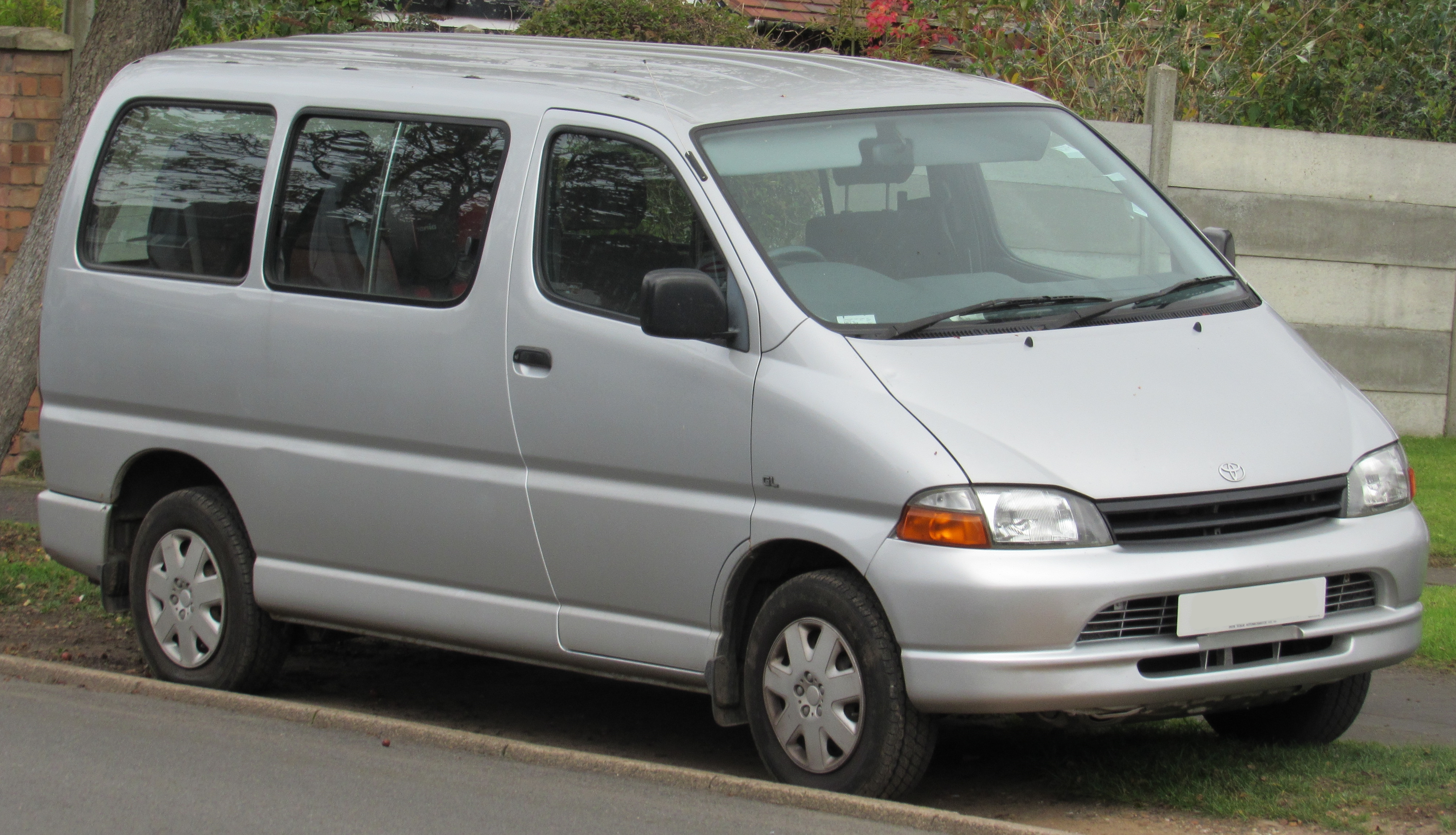
- 2001 Toyota HiAce Powerbus GL SWB 2.4 (LXH12; pre-facelift, UK)

Overview
- Model code: XH10; XH20
- Also called: Toyota Granvia; Toyota HiAce Regius (April 1997 - August 1999); Toyota Regius (August 1999 - May 2002); Toyota Touring HiAce; Toyota Grand HiAce; Toyota HiClass; Jinbei Granse (China)
- Production: August 1995 – April 2002 (Japan, Granvia); April 1997 - May 2002 (Japan, Hiace Regius/Regius); August 1999 - May 2002 (Japan, Touring Hiace and Grand Hiace); 1995–2012 (Europe); 1997–2007 (Taiwan); 2002–2020 (China, Jinbei Granse)
- Assembly: Japan: Kariya, Aichi (Toyota Auto Body); Portugal: Ovar (Toyota Caetano); Taiwan: Guanyin (Kuozui Motors)

Body and chassis
- Body style: 4/5-door van
- Layout: Front-engine, rear-wheel-drive / four-wheel drive
- Related: Toyota HiMedic (1997–2006)

Powertrain
- Engine: Petrol: 2.0 L 1RZ-E I4; 2.4 L 2RZ-E I4; 2.7 L 3RZ-FE I4; 3.4 L 5VZ-FE V6; Diesel: 2.4 L 2L-II I4; 2.5 L 2KD-FTV D-4D I4 (Intercooled/Non-Intercooled - Europe); 3.0 L 5L I4; 3.0 L 1KZ-TE I4
- Transmission: 4-speed automatic; 5-speed manual

Dimensions
- Wheelbase: 2,980–3,430 mm (117.3–135.0 in)
- Length: 4,695–5,235 mm (184.8–206.1 in)
- Width: 1,695–1,710 mm (66.7–67.3 in) (Regius/Touring HiAce); 1,800–1,835 mm (70.9–72.2 in) (Granvia/Grand HiAce)
- Height: 1,965–1,995 mm (77.4–78.5 in) (standard roof); 2,445–2,475 mm (96.3–97.4 in) (high roof)
- Curb weight: 1,780–2,160 kg (3,924.2–4,762.0 lb)

Chronology
- Successor: Toyota Alphard (Asia); Toyota ProAce (Europe)

Sold in the Japanese market between 1995 and 2002, the Granvia is a semi-bonneted van, with the front wheels positioned in front of the front seats for better safety. Available with seven- and eight-seater configurations and in rear-wheel drive or four-wheel drive, it is based on the regular HiAce. Because of tighter safety regulations, this model replaced the mid-engined HiAce in Europe and several other markets. The engines for Granvia are either a 2.4 L or 3.0 L diesel, or 2.7- and 3.4 L petrol. The Granvia spawned into the upmarket multi-purpose vehicles the HiAce Regius, the Grand HiAce and the Touring HiAce. The Granvia, Grand HiAce, and Touring HiAce are upmarket passenger vans only.

In Europe, the Granvia-based HiAce sold from 1995 was usually equipped with the 2.5L 2KD-FTV diesel engine in a variety of versions. The HiAce underwent a facelift in 2006, with bigger "jewel-style" headlights, and continued to be built in this form until 2012, replaced by the Toyota ProAce.

In the UK market, the XH10 HiAce replaced the H100 HiAce and HiAce Compact in 1996 as a fifth generation model initially available with either the 2.4L 2L-II diesel developing 55 kW at 4000 rpm and 156 Nm at 2200 rpm alongside the 2.7L 3RZ-FE petrol engine developing 105 kW at 4800 rpm and 226 Nm at 2400 rpm. The 2.4L Diesel was replaced in November 2001 to comply with Euro Step III Emission standards by the 2KD-FTV in either Low Power variant producing 66 kW at 3800 rpm and 192 Nm at 1200-3000 rpm and High Power Variation producing 76 kW at 3600 rpm and 260 Nm at 1600-2400 rpm while the 2.7 Petrol would later be discontinued in 2004. In 2007 the engines were revised for Euro IV compliance with the addition of an intercooler improving max torque to 230 Nm at 1400-2800 rpm for the low power variant and 294 Nm at 1400-2400 rpm for the high power variant and power output to 70 kW and 85 kW respectively at 3600 rpm.

In Australia, the Granvia was sold as the HiAce SBV, alongside the fourth generation HiAce, and both were replaced by the new fifth generation model. The HiAce SBV sold in Australia (from 1996 to 2003) was designated RCH12R (short wheelbase) and RCH22R (long wheelbase) and was available only with 2.4-litre 2RZ-E petrol engine developing 88 kW at 4800 rpm and 200 Nm at 3600 rpm and five-speed manual transmission.

They are also very popular in New Zealand, imported as used vehicles from Japan. The 3.0-litre turbocharged diesel is especially favoured as its enormous torque but not so impressive power output are ideally suited to the hilly conditions in a country with an overall 100 km/h speed limit. Many of these vehicles are in commercial passenger service.

The Grand HiAce was based on the HiAce Powervan. Sales of the Grand HiAce started in Japan in 1999. Engines available were a 3.4-litre petrol and a 3.0-litre turbo-diesel. This type was sold in Japan only until 2002, when it was replaced by the Alphard. In Taiwan, the Granvia was badged HiAce Solemio.

The semi-bonneted HiAce was sold in Norway and was the best selling van for many years until 1 January 2012, when it was withdrawn the European market as it could not be made to pass the Euro 5 emissions rules.

The HiAce sold in Europe was replaced with a rebadged version of the Citroën Jumpy/Peugeot Expert/Fiat Scudo which is sold as the Toyota ProAce. It's made in cooperation with Jinbei as the Jinbei Granse (阁瑞斯 Geruisi) or Grace in English.

The Jinbei Granse was produced in China from 2002 to 2020. The model itself has had three facelifts with the first occurring in 2005 and production lasted until 2009. The second facelift was unveiled that year. These two models are based on their Japanese counterparts. A third facelift model began in 2014 and is also in production along with the second model. All Granse models ended production for the 2020 model year.

Another model was also unveiled in 2020 known as the Jinbei Haishiwang or Jinbei Haise King. This model also shares relations to the Jinbei Granse and Toyota Granvia. Available in both low roof and high roof, the exterior of the rear of the low roof version is styled similarly to the Hiace XH10 and XH20 pre-facelift models sold in the UK and Australian markets while the latter takes on a more refined modern design. The standard engine is a 2 litre four cylinder paired to a 6 speed manual transmission and is available as a 7-seater or 9-seater van. A CNG version is also available for purchase as part of Jinbei's Traditional Energy model line as well as an electric version as part of its New Energy model line from 2025 onwards.

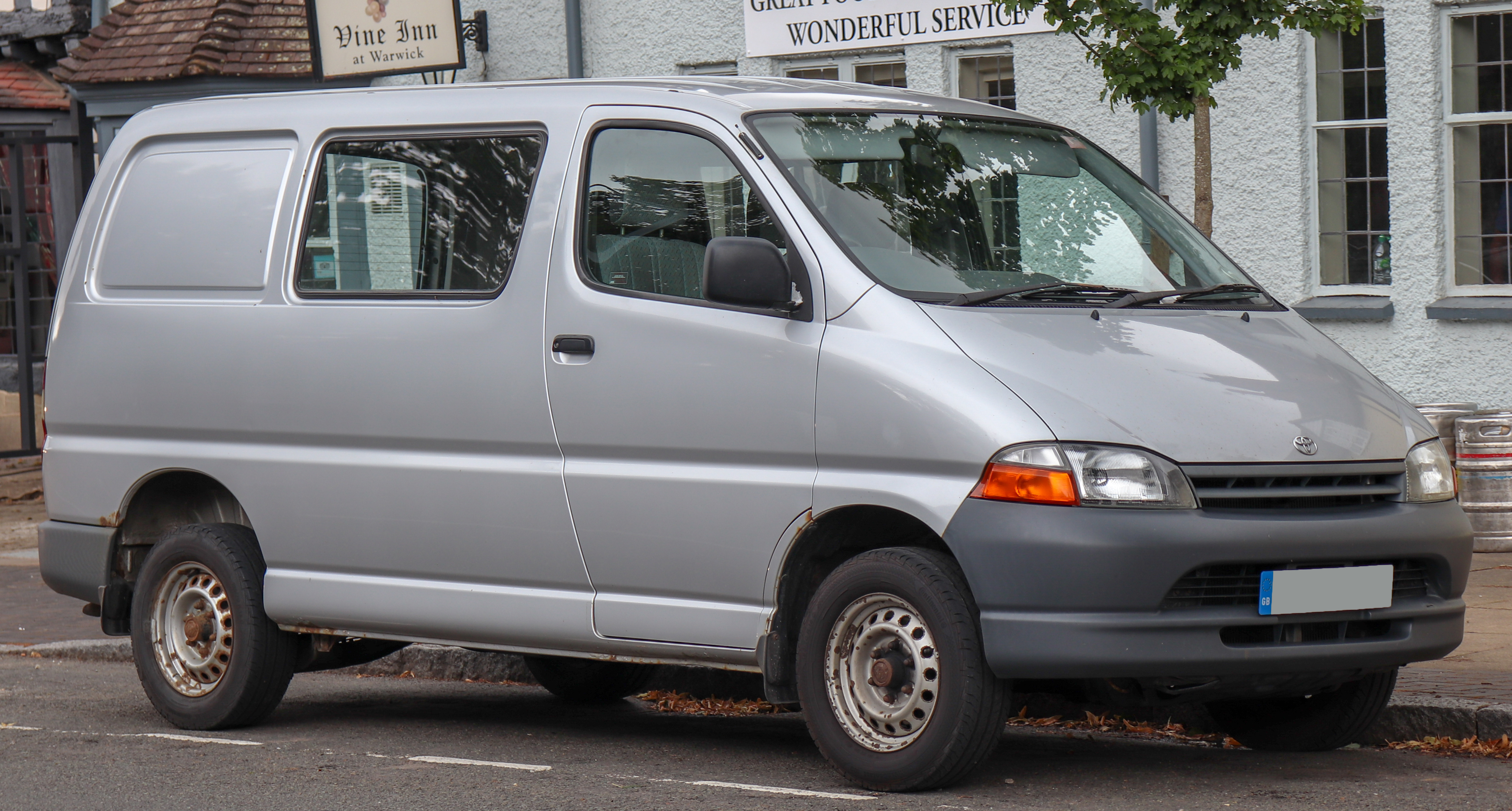
2001 Toyota HiAce Powervan GS SWB 2.4 (LXH12; pre-facelift, UK)

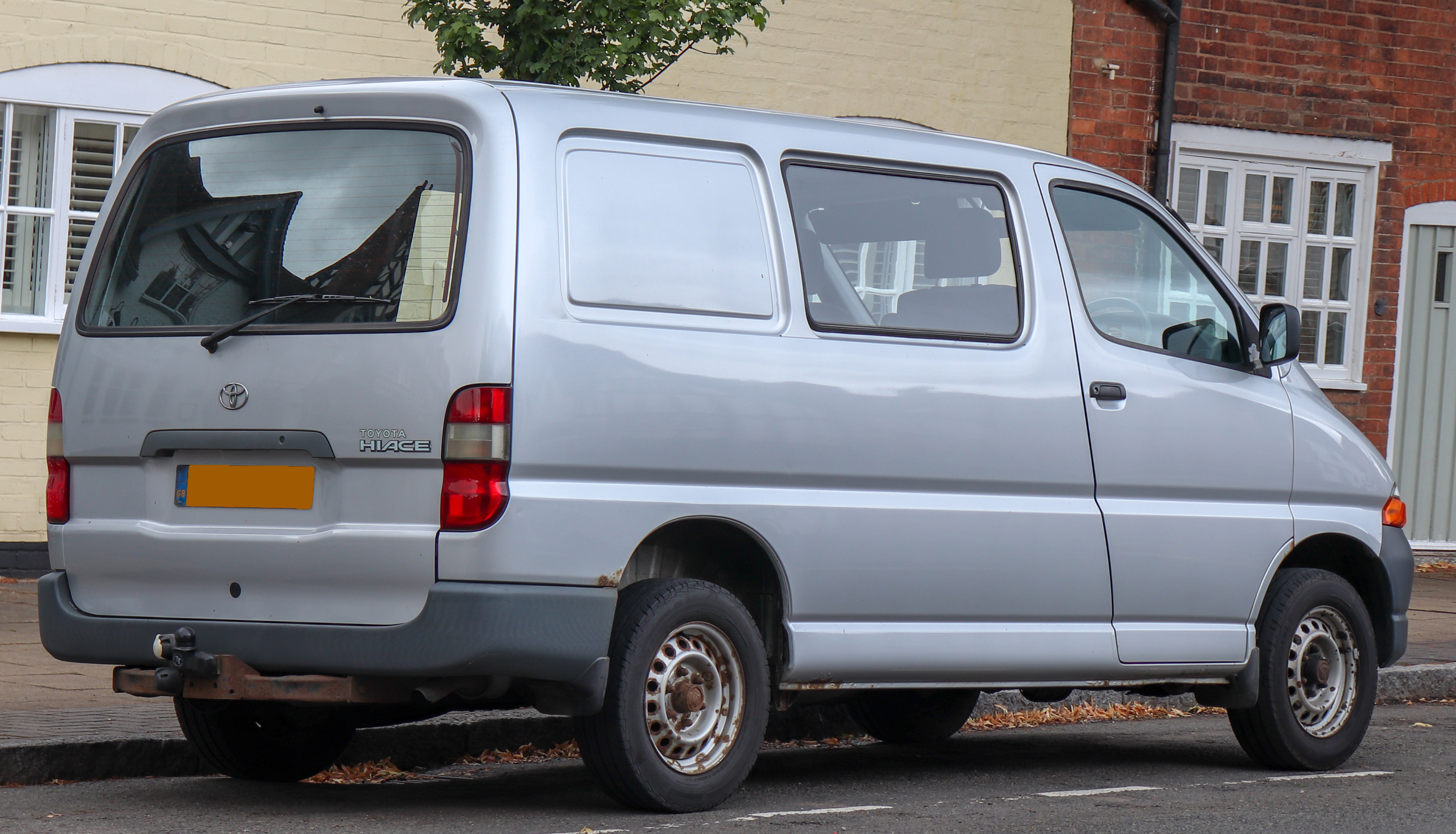
2001 Toyota HiAce Powervan GS SWB 2.4 (LXH12; pre-facelift, UK)

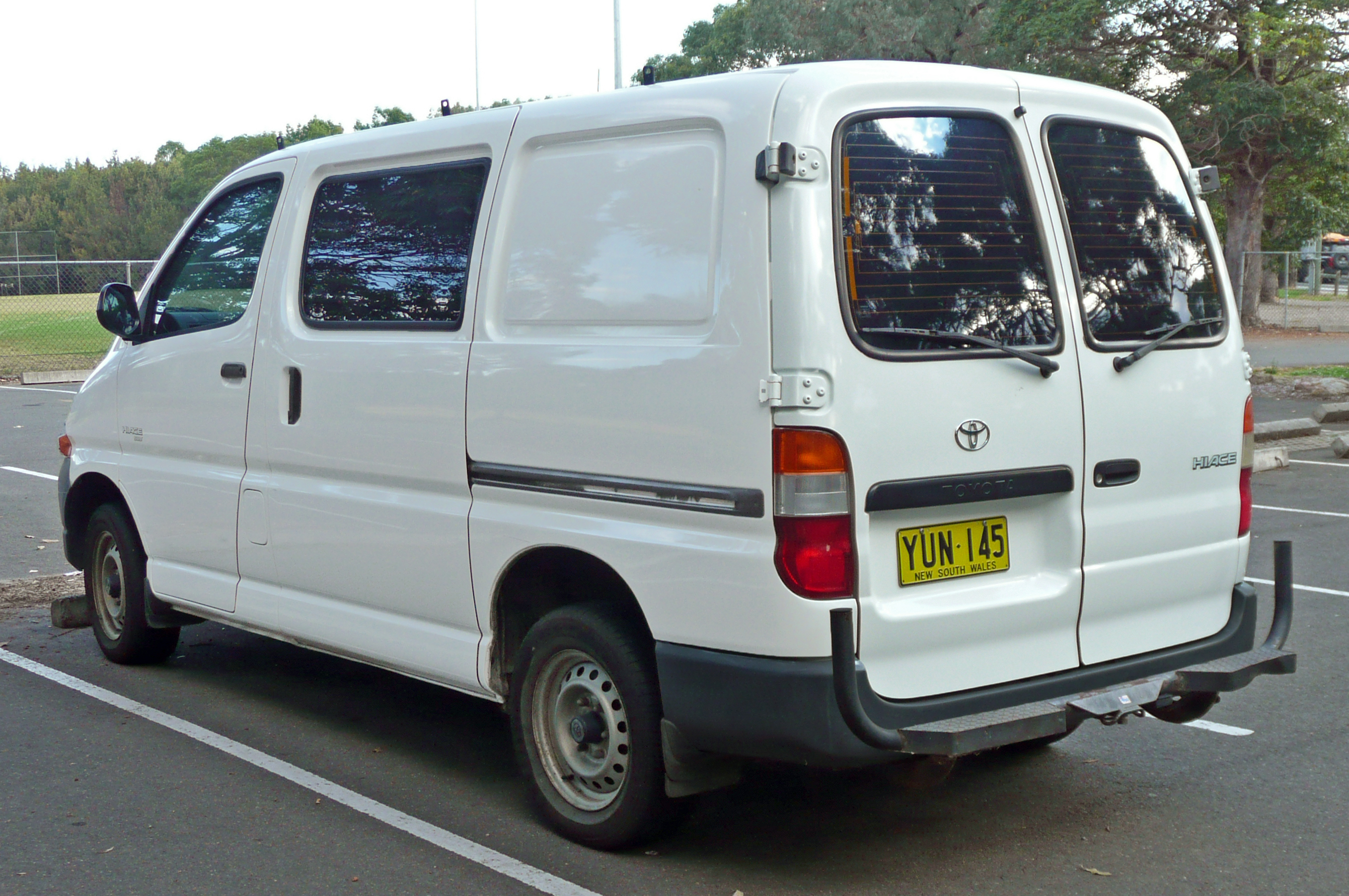
Toyota HiAce SBV (RCH12R; pre-facelift, Australia)

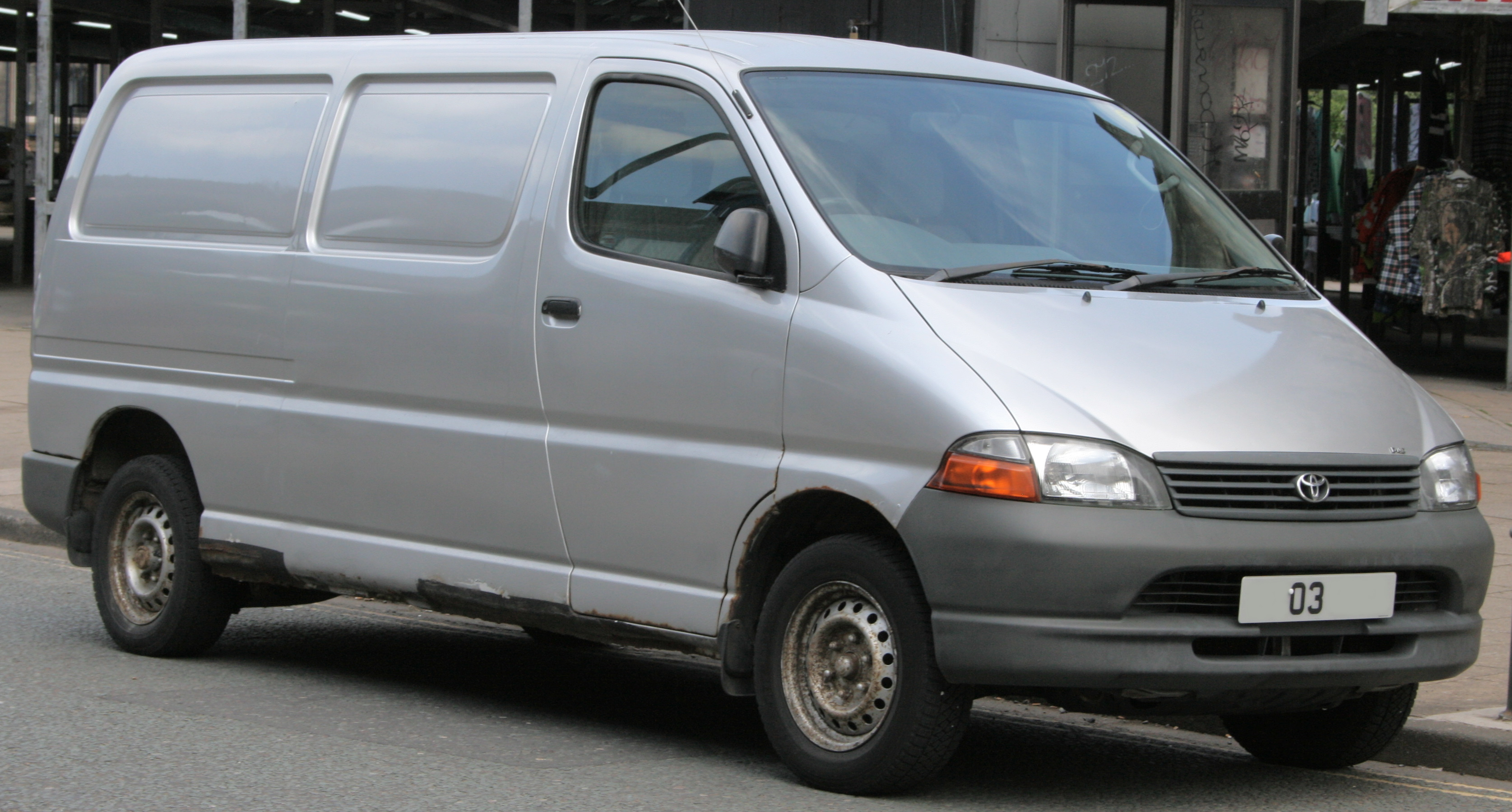
2003 Toyota HiAce LWB 2.5 (KLH22; first facelift, UK)

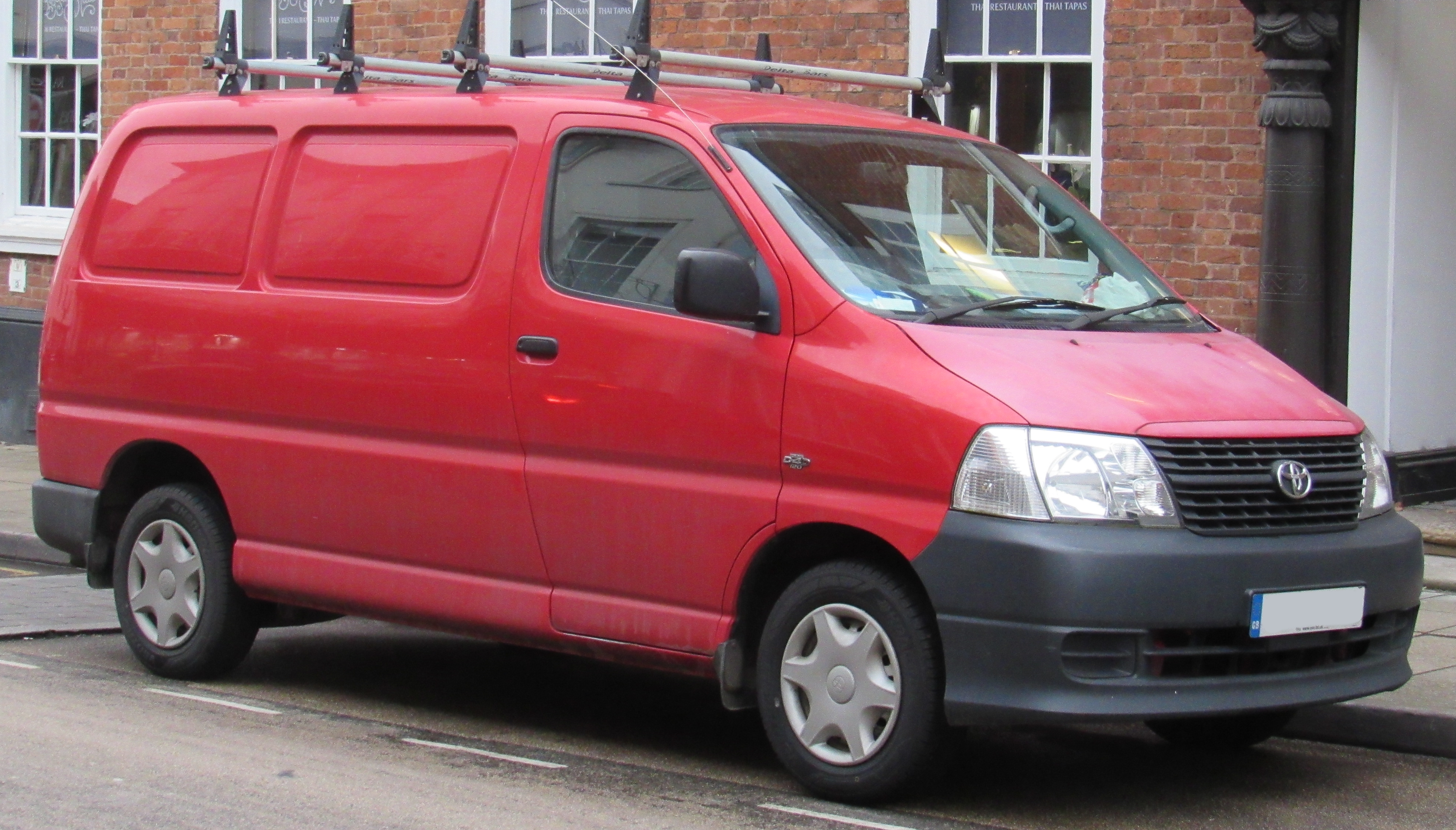
2007 HiAce Van SWB (KLH12; second facelift, UK)

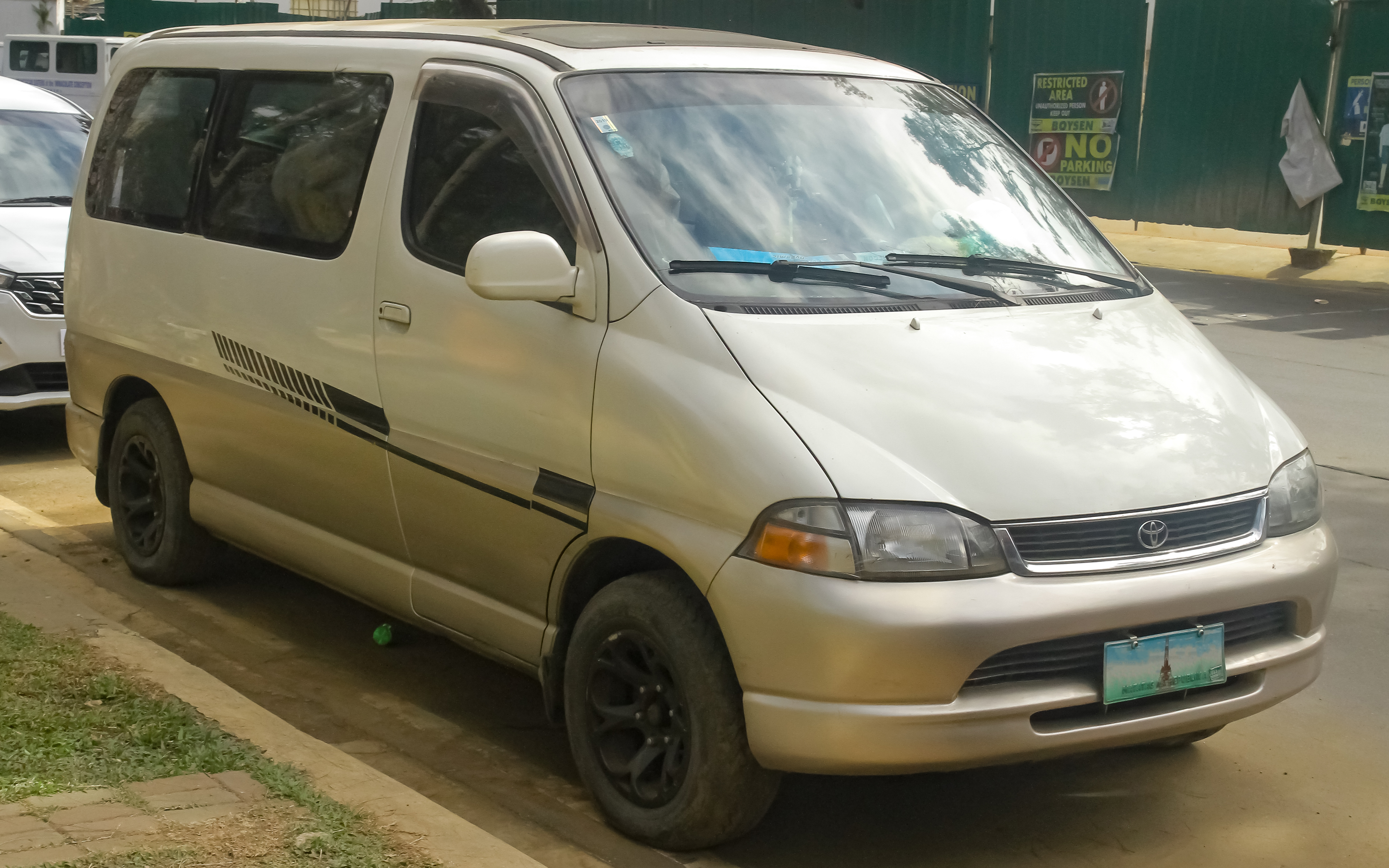
Toyota Granvia 3.0 G (pre-facelift)

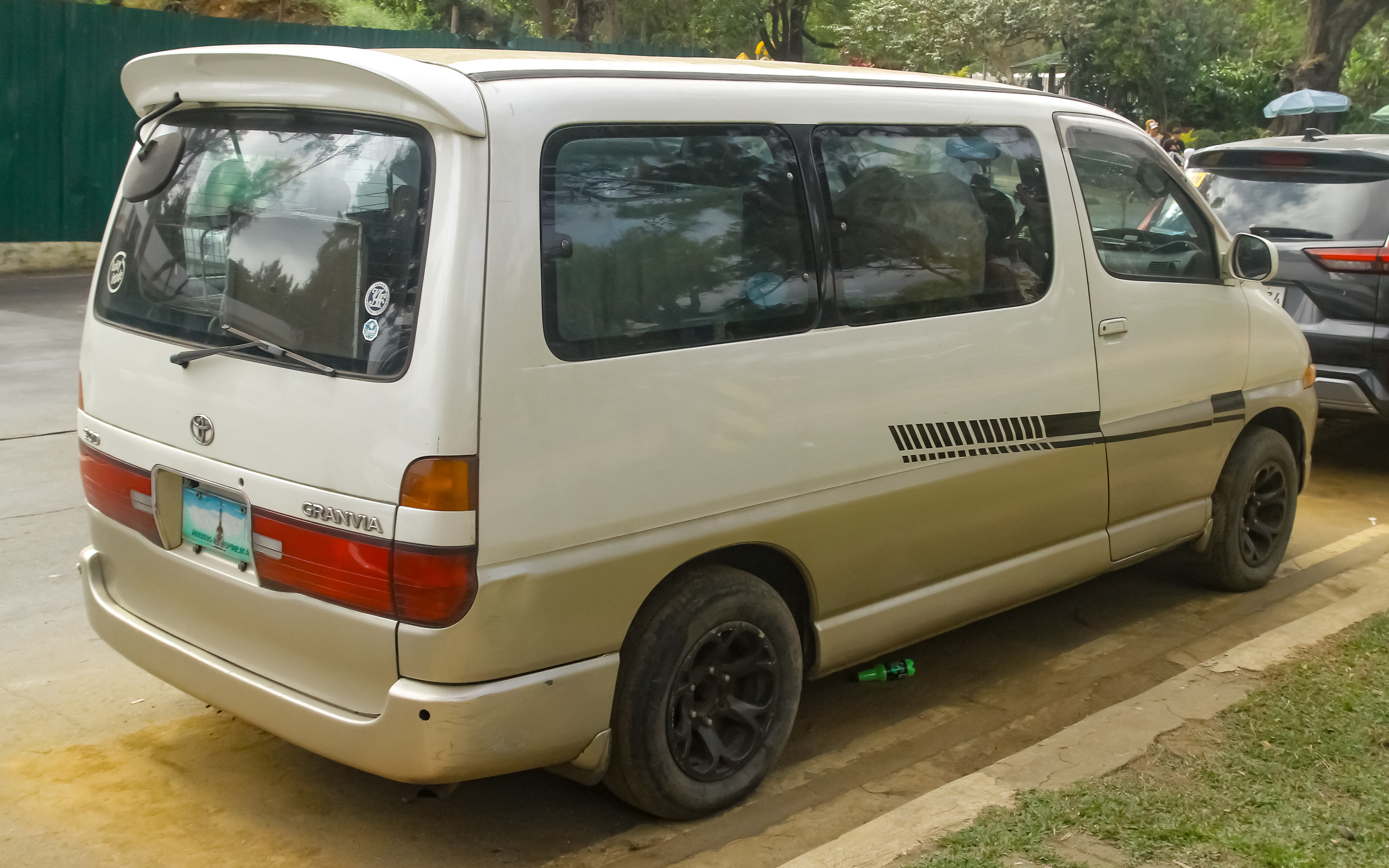
Toyota Granvia 3.0 G (pre-facelift)

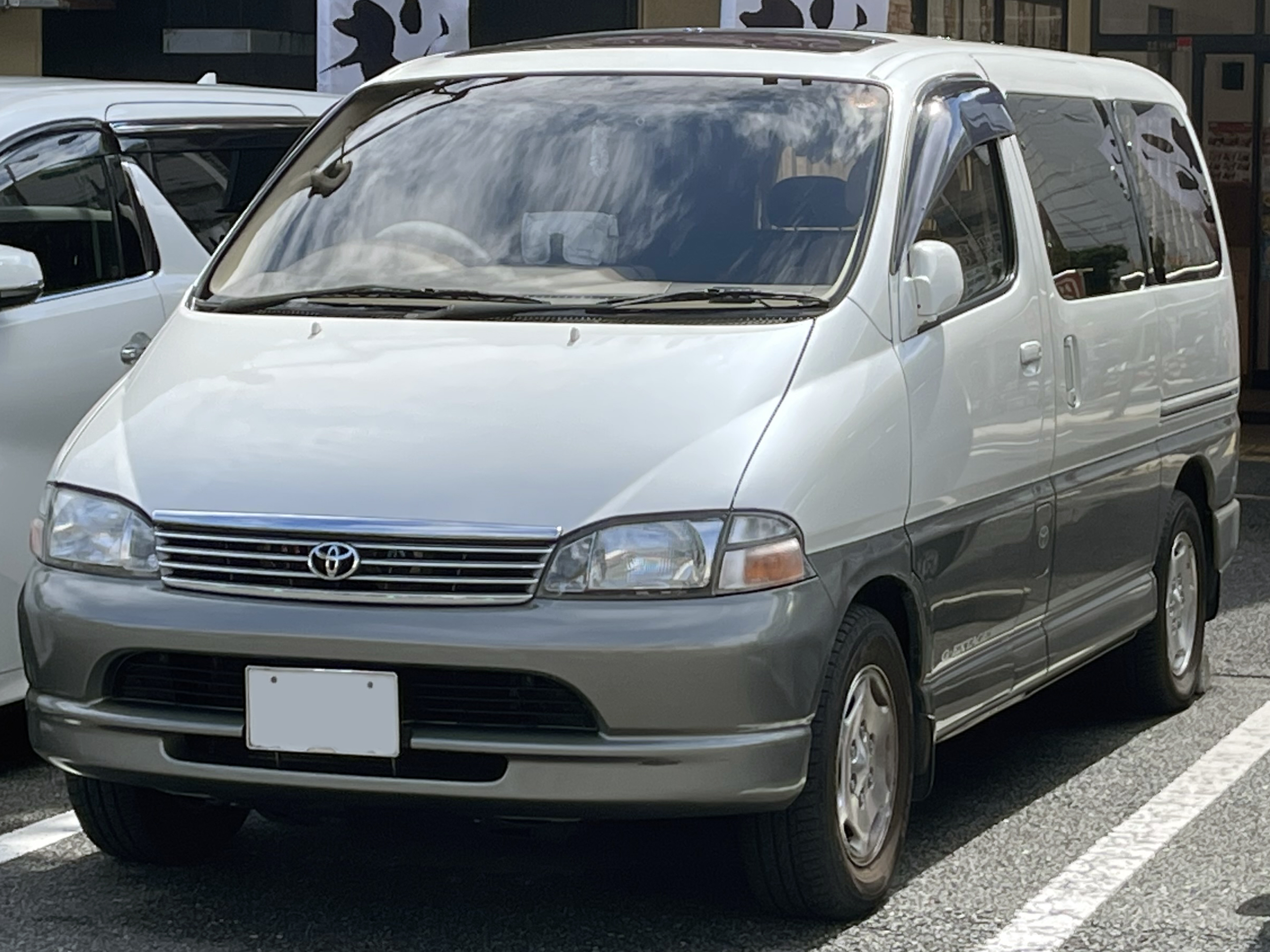
Toyota Granvia (VCH16W; first facelift, Japan)

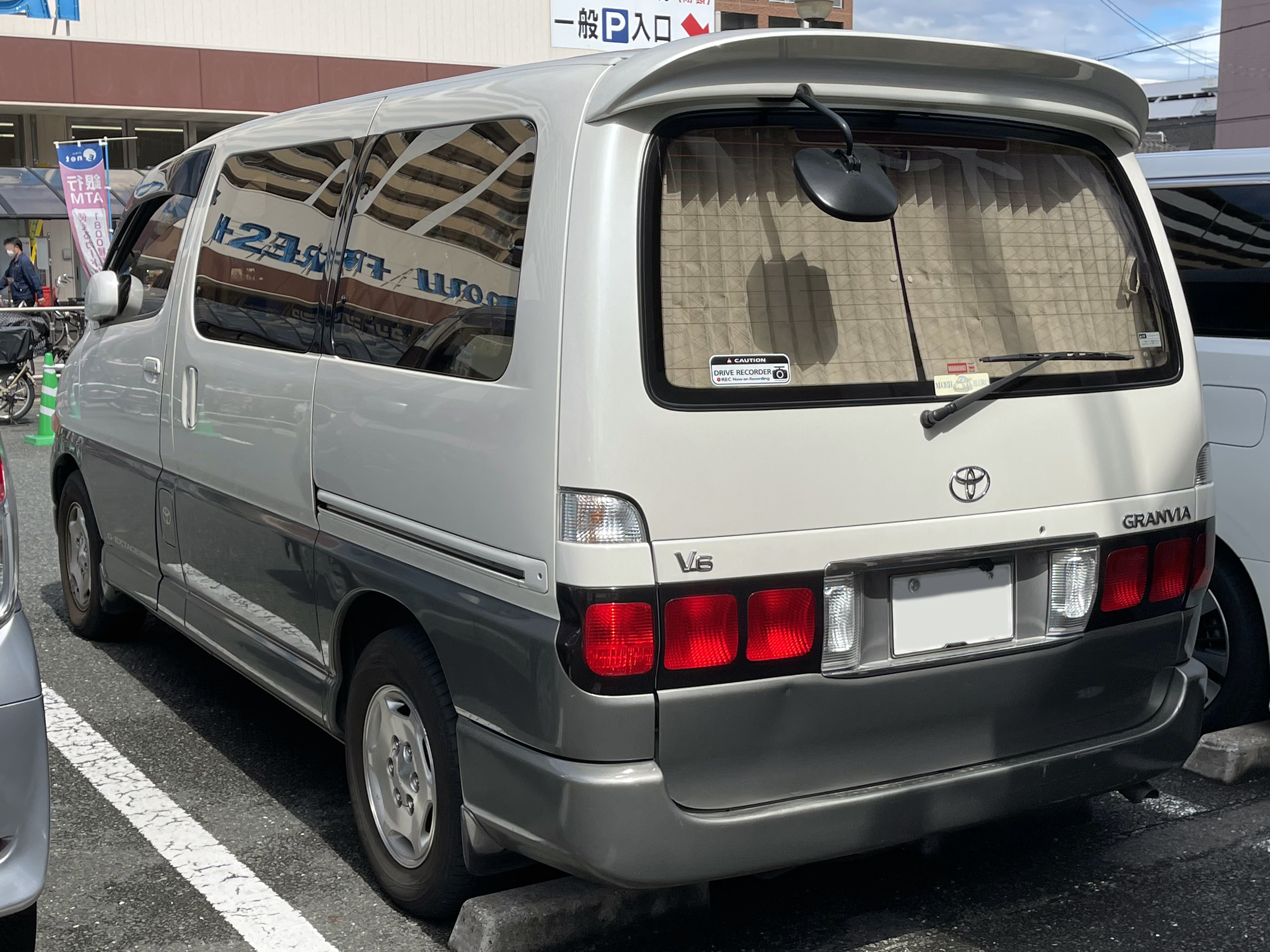
Toyota Granvia (VCH16W; first facelift, Japan)

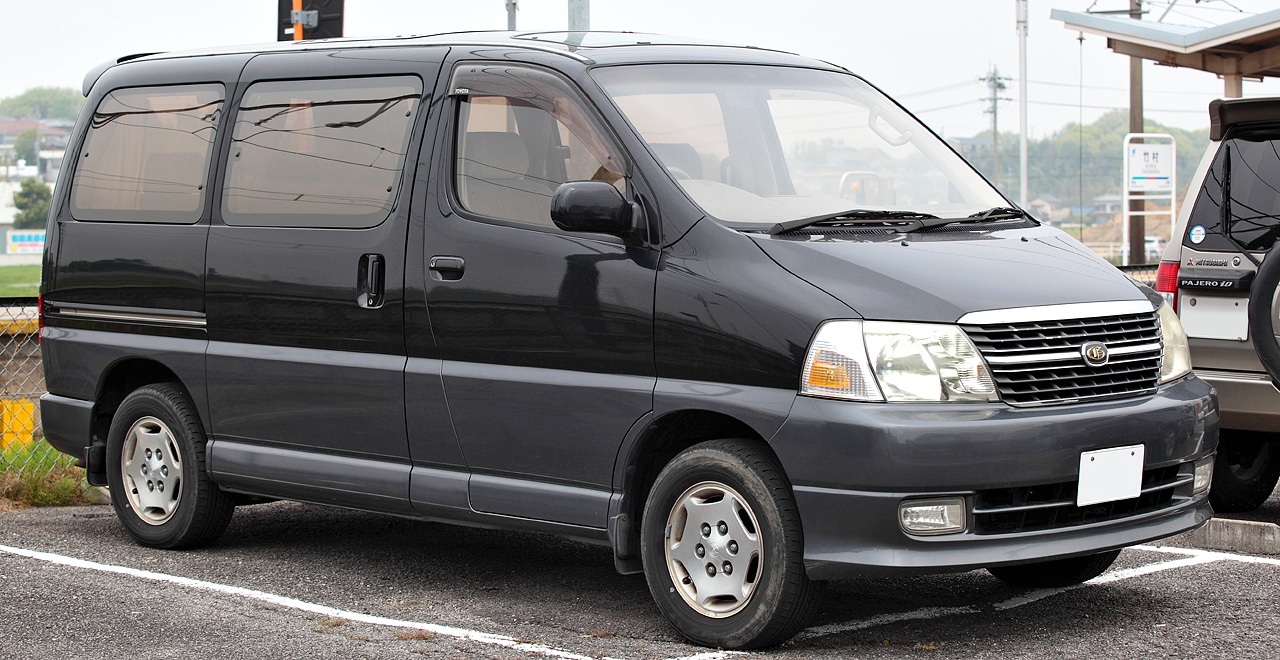
Toyota Granvia (second facelift, Japan)

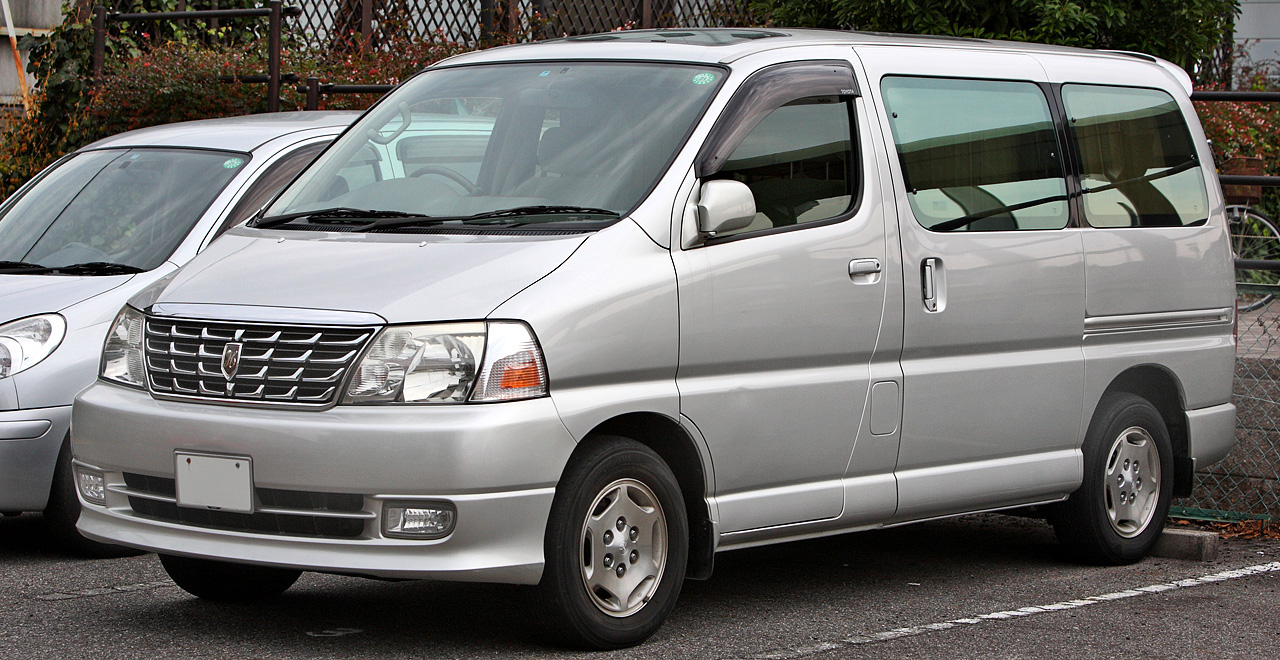
Toyota Grand HiAce (Japan)

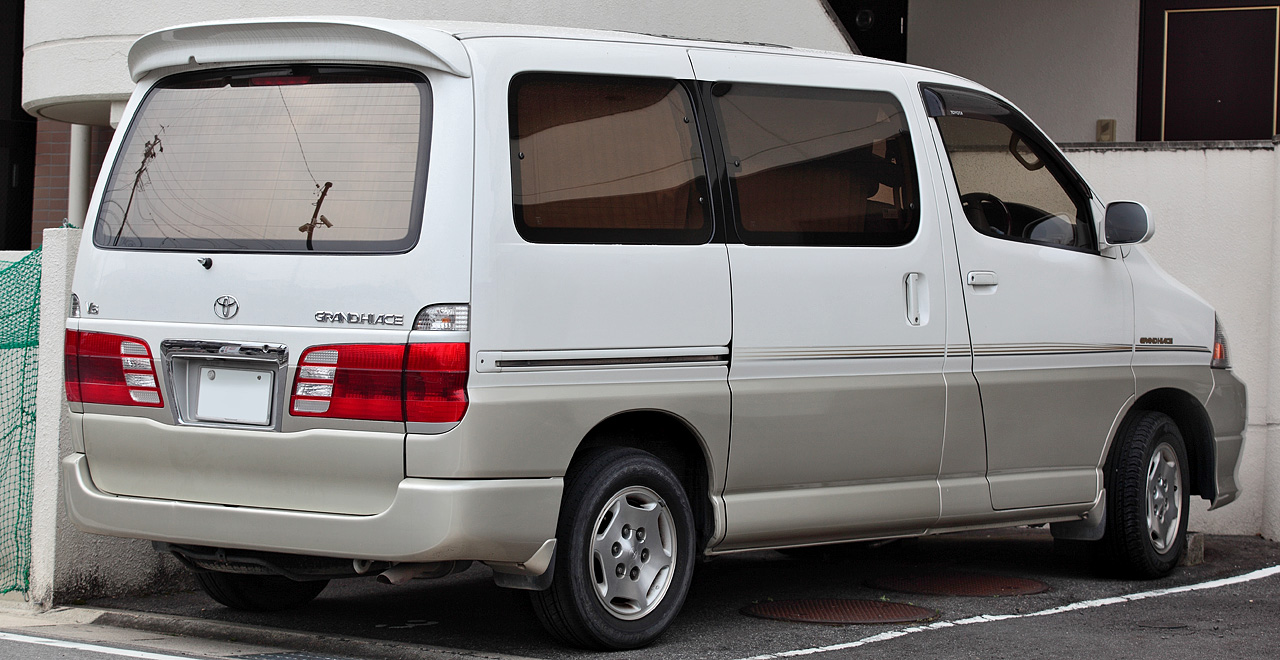
Toyota Grand HiAce (Japan)

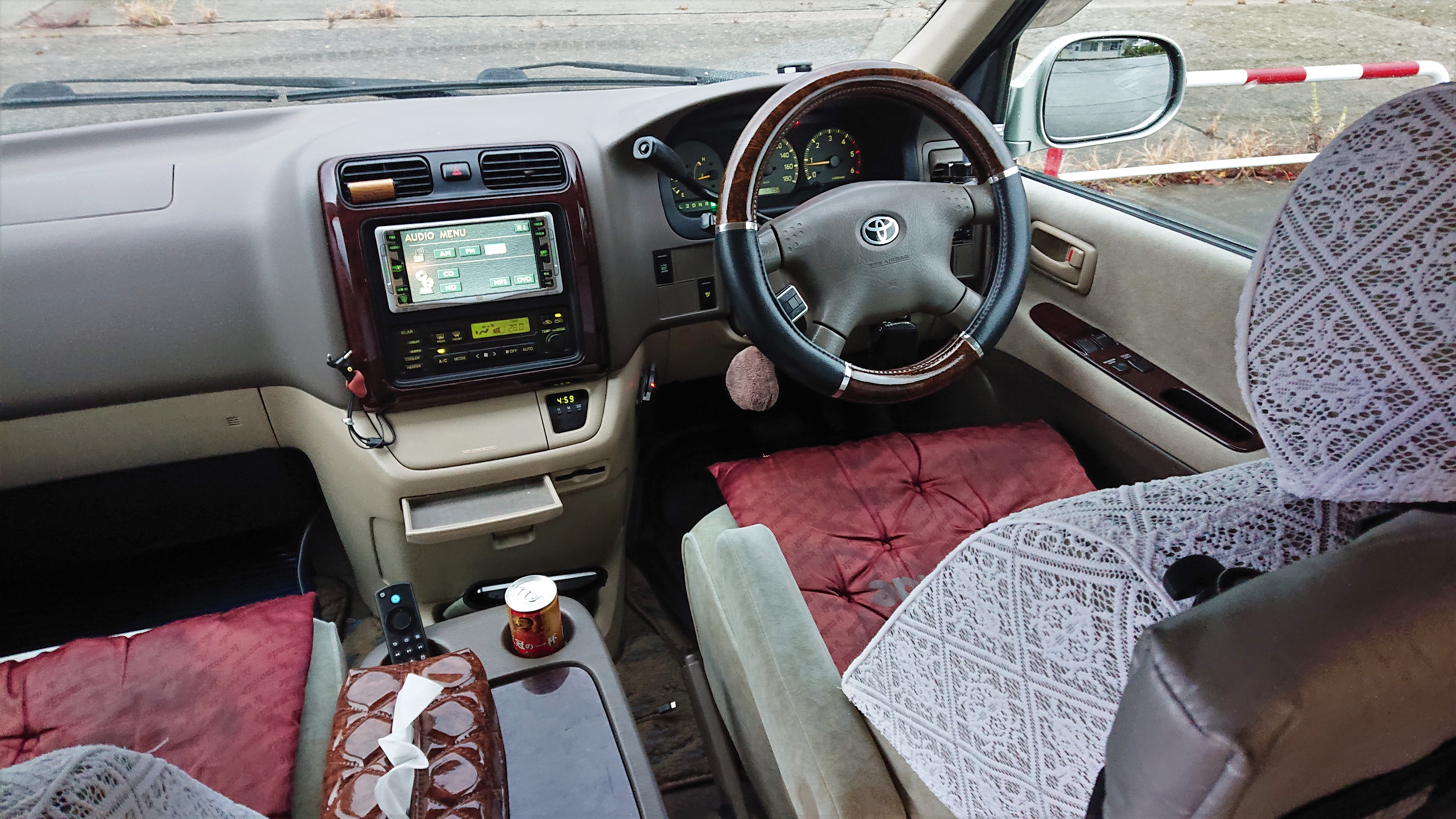
Toyota Grand HiAce interior

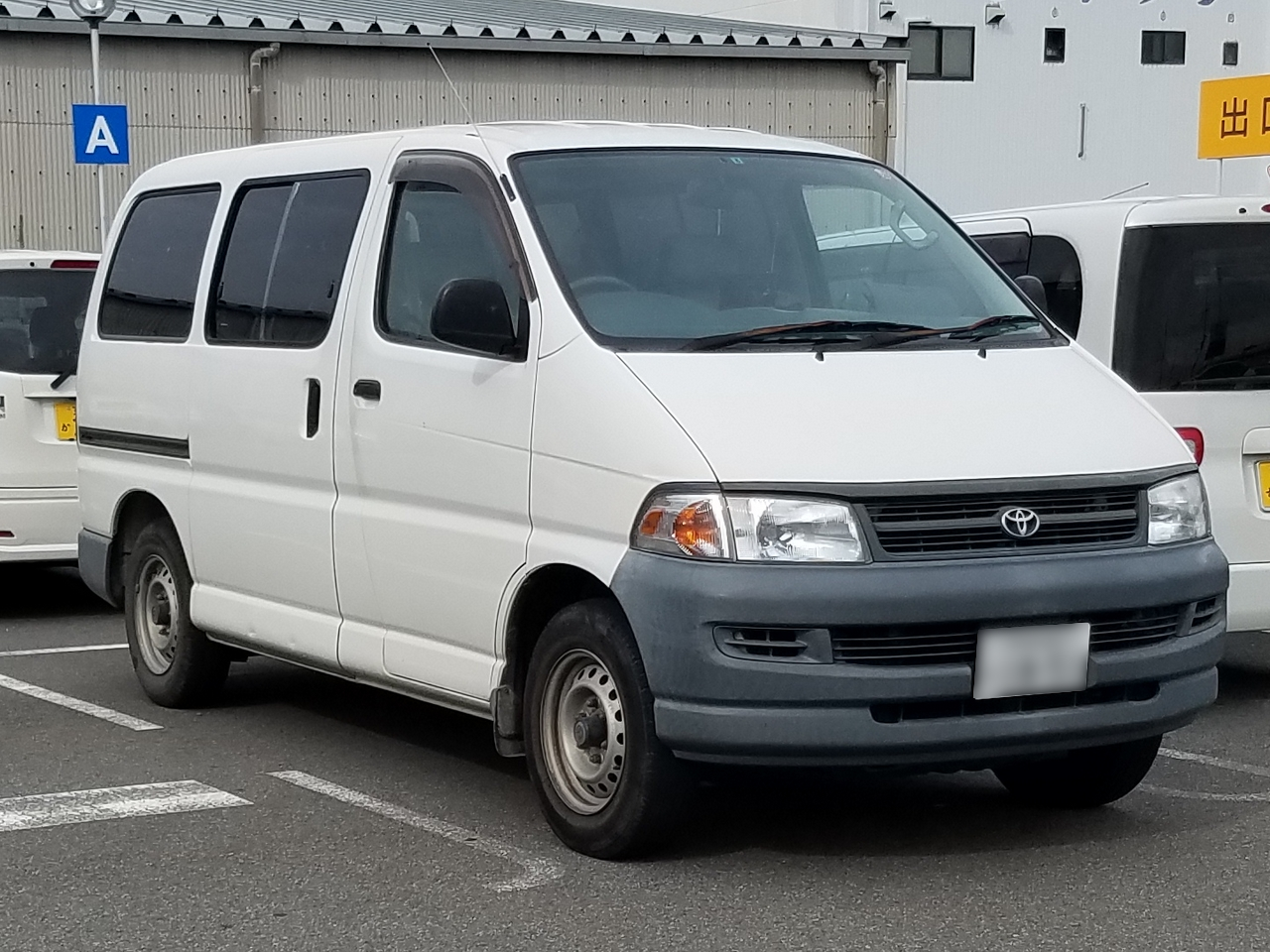
Toyota Regius Van (Japan)

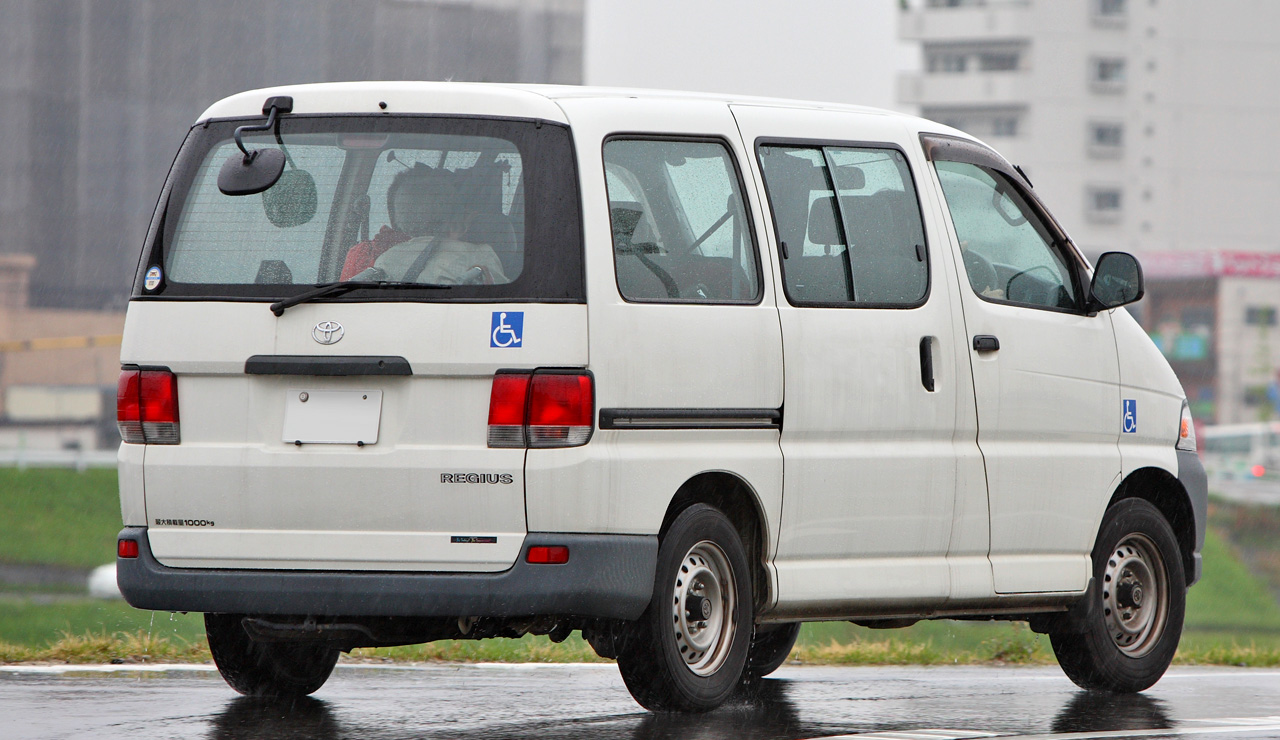
Toyota Regius Van (Japan)

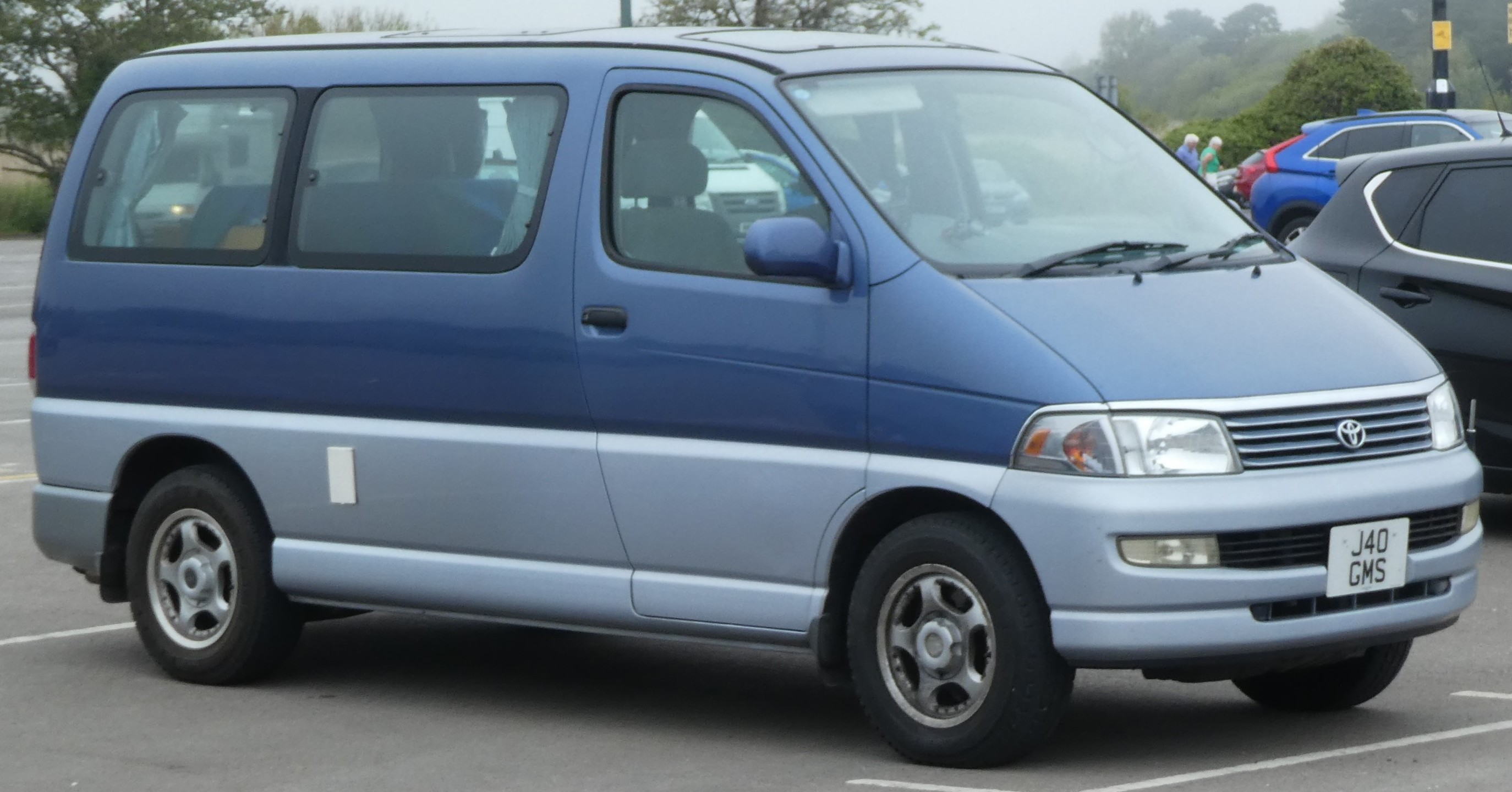
Toyota HiAce Regius (Japan)

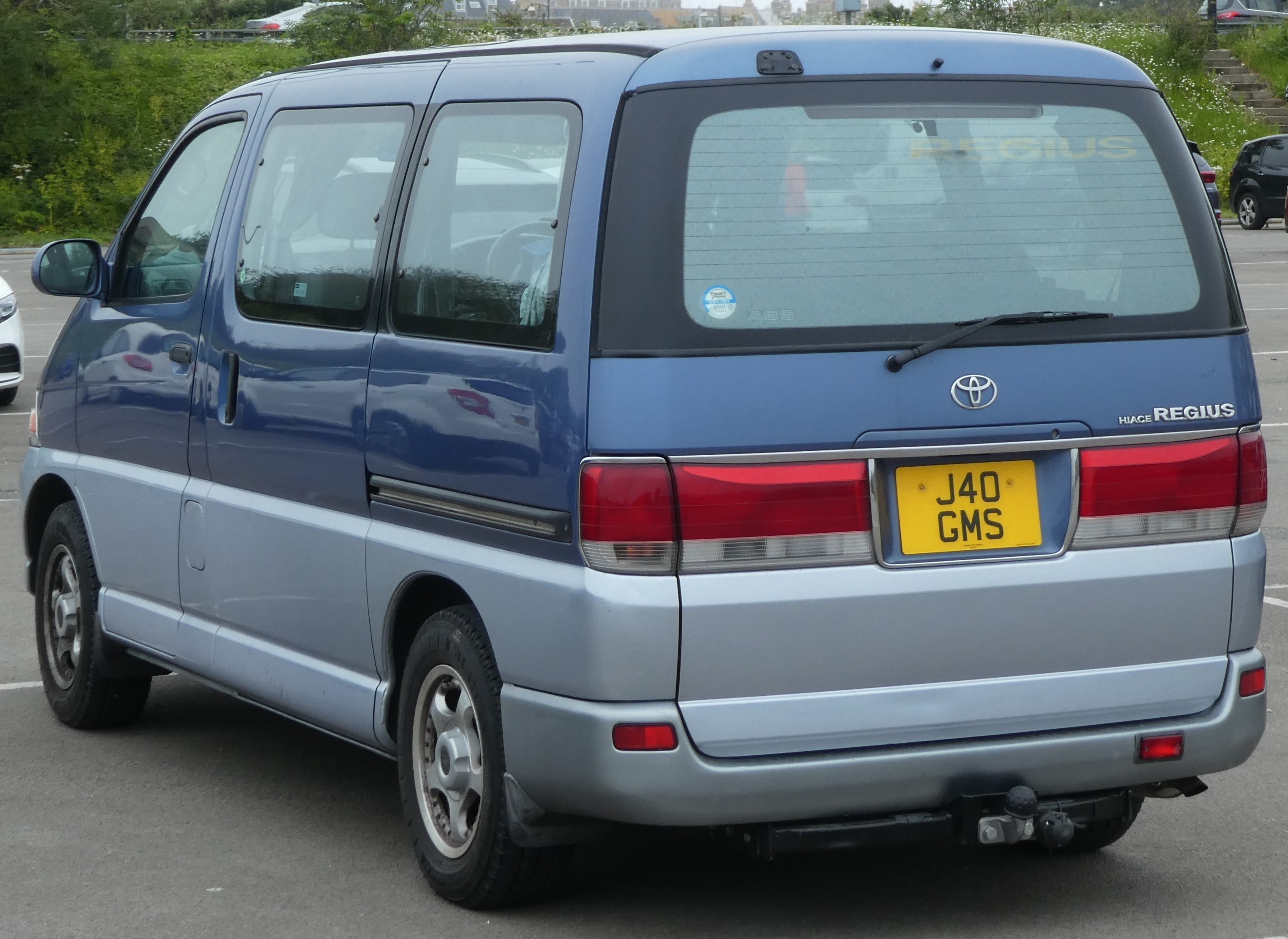
Toyota HiAce Regius (Japan)

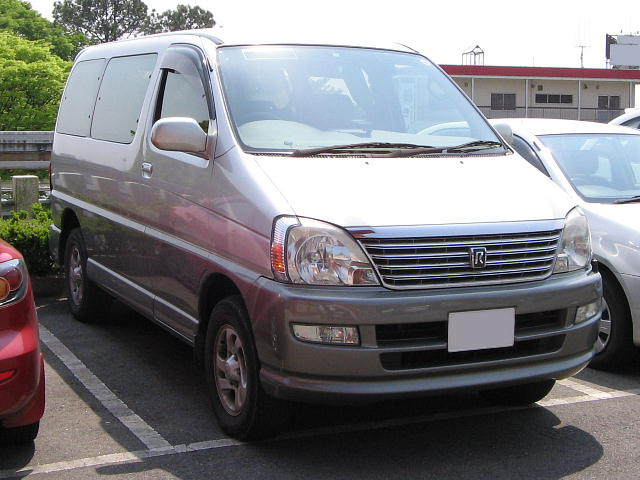
Toyota Regius (Japan)

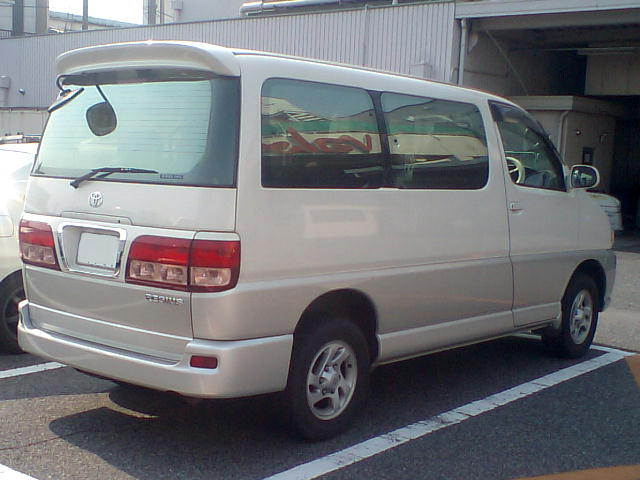
Toyota Regius (Japan)

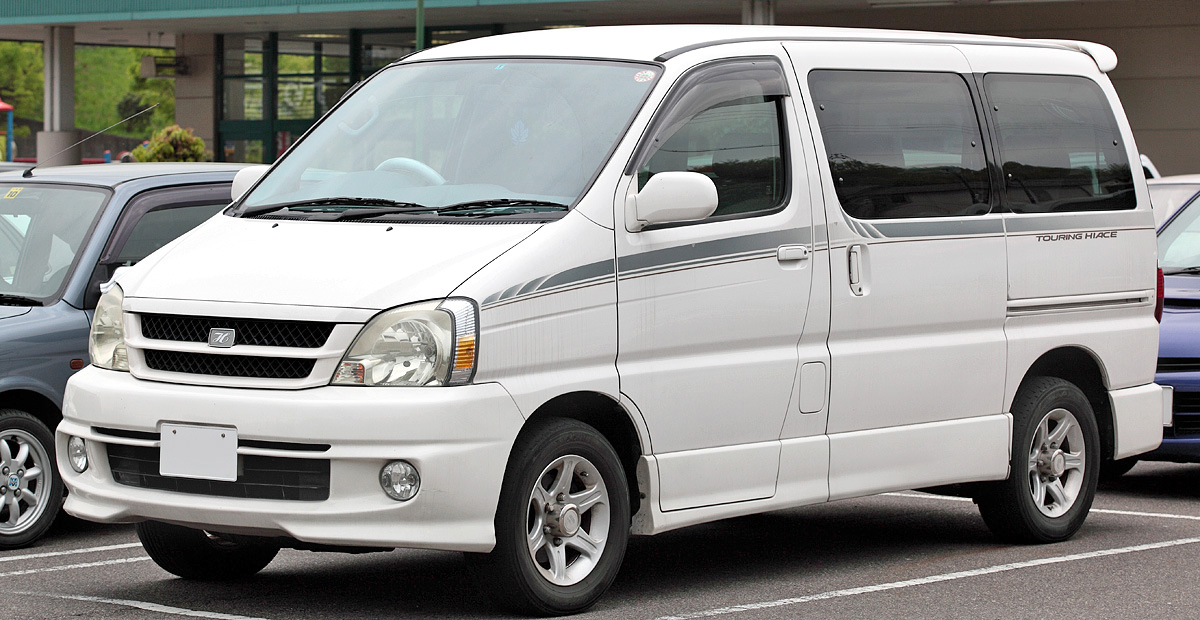
Toyota Touring Hiace (Japan)

== Fifth generation (H200; 2004) ==
Fifth generation
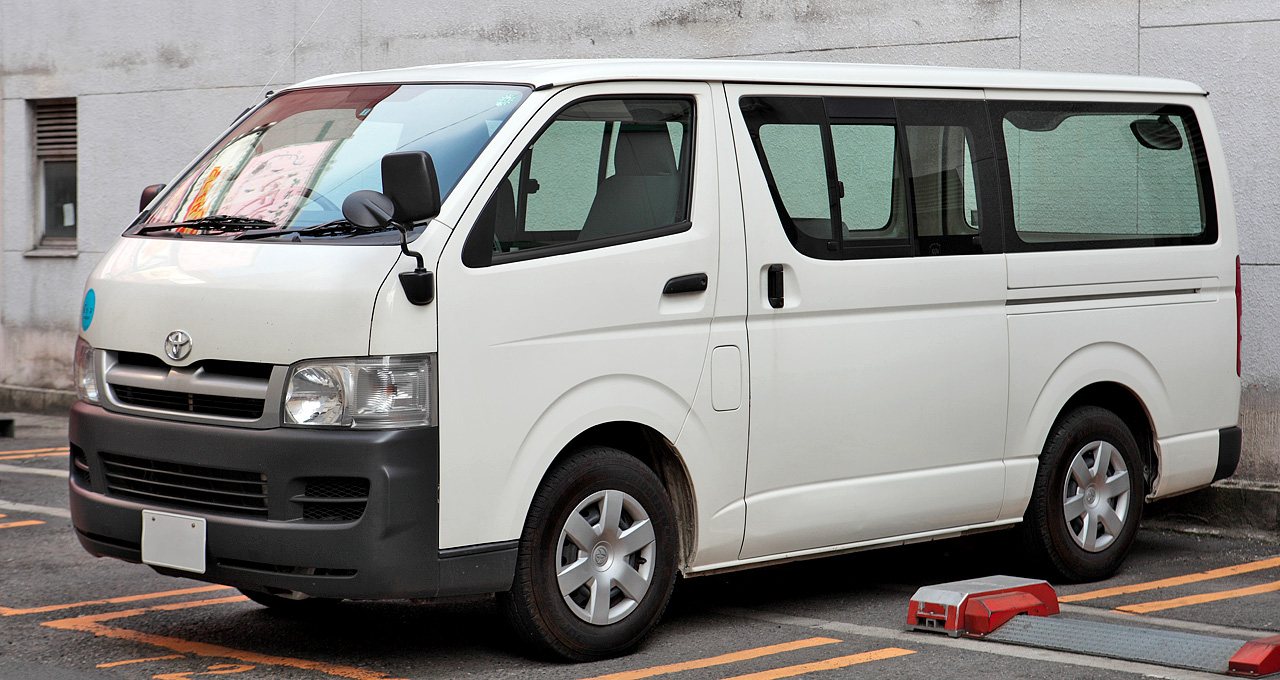
- HiAce Long Van 2.0 DX 5-door (TRH200V; pre-facelift, Japan)

Overview
- Model code: H200
- Also called: Toyota Commuter (Thailand); Toyota RegiusAce (Japan); Toyota Quantum (South Africa); Toyota Ventury (Thailand); Mazda Bongo Brawny (Japan; 2019–present)
- Production: 2004–2019 (global market); August 2004 – present (Japan, Indonesia, Malaysia, Philippines, Singapore, Sri Lanka and South Africa); 2021 (India); 2006–2021 (Vietnam)
- Assembly: Japan: Inabe, Mie (Toyota Auto Body); Kakamigahara, Gifu (Gifu Auto Body); Toyota, Aichi (Honsha plant); South Africa: Durban; Thailand: Samut Prakan (Toyota Auto Works, 2012–2019); Vietnam: Hanoi (TMV); Malaysia: Shah Alam, Selangor (UMWT, ASSB)

Body and chassis
- Body style: 3/4/5-door van/minibus
- Layout: Front-engine, rear-wheel-drive / four-wheel drive
- Related: Toyota HiMedic (2006–present)

Powertrain
- Engine: Petrol: 2.0 L 1TR-FE I4; 2.7 L 2TR-FE I4; Diesel: 2.5 L 2KD-FTV Low Version I4; 2.8 L 1GD-FTV I4 (2018–present); 3.0 L 5L-E I4; 3.0 L 1KZ-TE Turbodiesel I4 (KZH200, 2004–2006); 3.0 L 1KD-FTV Diesel I4
- Transmission: 5-speed manual; 4-speed automatic; 6-speed automatic

Dimensions
- Wheelbase: SWB: 2,570 mm (101.2 in); LWB: 3,110 mm (122.4 in)
- Length: 4,695–5,380 mm (184.8–211.8 in); SWB: 4,840 mm (190.6 in)
- Width: 1,695–1,880 mm (66.7–74.0 in)
- Height: Commuter/SWB: 1,980 mm (78.0 in); GL Grandia/Super Grandia/LWB: 2,105 mm (82.9 in)
- Curb weight: 1,610–2,200 kg (3,549–4,850 lb)

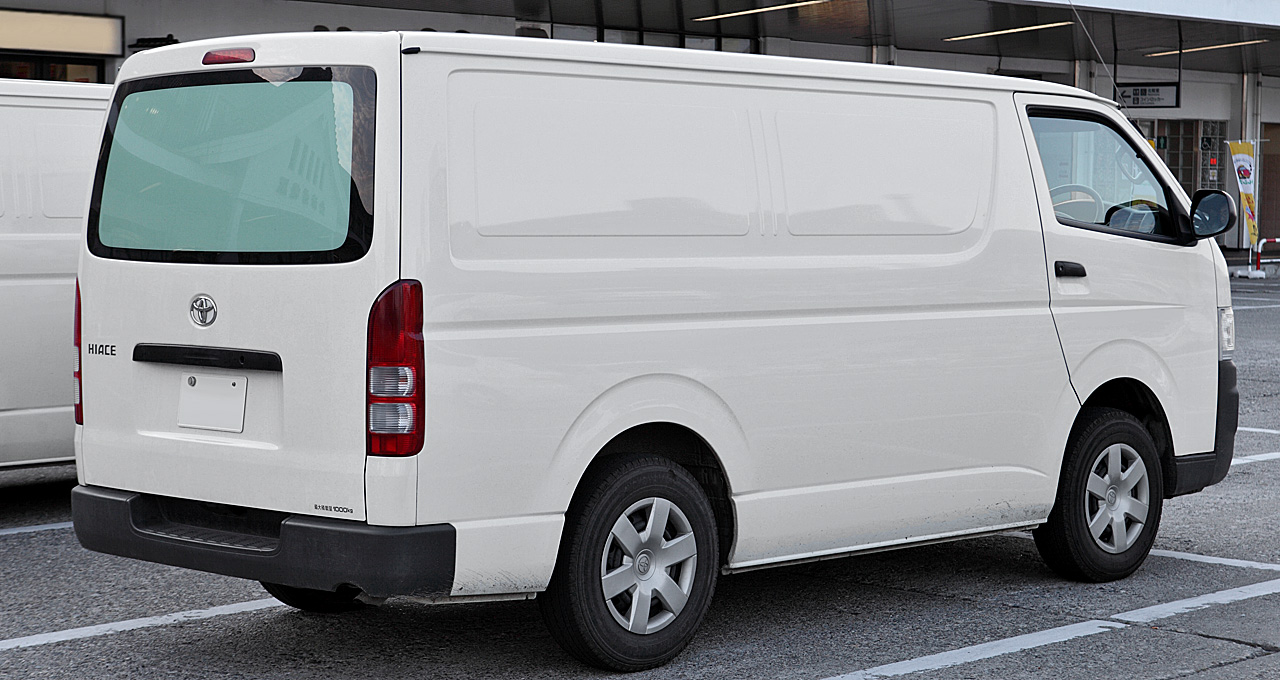
HiAce Long Van 2.0 DX (TRH200V; pre-facelift, Japan)

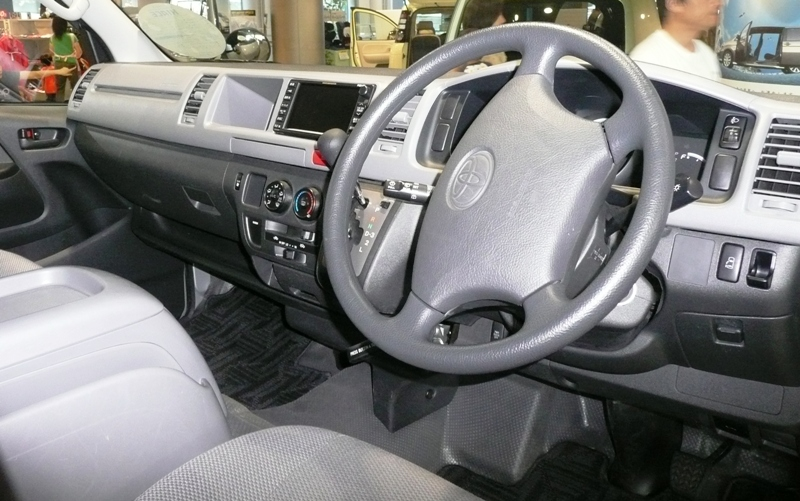
Interior

The fifth-generation HiAce became available for sale in Japan on 23 August 2004 as a wide long-wheelbase wagon, wide super-long-wheelbase high-roof "Grand Cabin", long-wheelbase van, long-wheelbase high-roof van and a wide super-long-wheelbase high-roof van. In this generation of the HiAce, the gear lever has been moved to the dashboard to enable easier movement in the cabin. Transmission choices range from a five-speed manual and four-speed automatic. Its design was previewed by DMT concept at 2001 Tokyo Motor Show.

Most models use a four-cylinder DOHC engine, in a variety of forms, a 1TR-FE 2000 cc or 2TR-FE 2,700 cc petrol engine, or a 2KD-FTV 2,500 cc or 1KD-FTV 3,000 cc D-4D turbo-diesel engine. Two of these engines are available in Malaysia, the 2.5 L turbo-diesel, offered in a choice of panel van or window van; and the 2.7 L petrol, that comes only in the window van option. At least some general export market HiAces are powered by the 5L-E 3,000 cc diesel engine.

The HiAce initially carried over the 3.0 L 1KZ-TE diesel engine from the previous generation at its launch before the engine discontinued in 2006.

In Japan, Toyota's internet-enhanced GPS and vehicle telematics service called G-Book was made available as an option on all trim packages for both private and commercial uses.

The emergency response version, HiMedic was released in April 2006.

The fifth generation HiAce was launched in the Philippines on 13 June 2005, with 2.5-litre 2KD engines; The 15-seater Commuter and the 13-seater GL Grandia, both with manual transmission. In March 2006, the new top-of-the-line 11-Seater HiAce Super Grandia was launched, being the first ever HiAce in the Philippines with a standard automatic transmission. In 2015, the GL Grandia received a 4 speed automatic transmission option and the 10-seater Super Grandia LXV was added in the HiAce lineup, based on the GL Grandia trim, the LXV was only offered with an automatic transmission and receives 15-inch alloy wheels, updated rear seats, higher roof (campervan) and a high end audio system. All HiAce trims in the Philippines were updated in October 2015 with the new 3.0-litre turbo-diesel 1KD engine. The GL Grandia and Super Grandia LXV grades were sold until April 2019 and the Super Grandia grade was sold until August 2019. The 3.0 Commuter model is still being sold alongside the H300 model. In May 2020, the 3.0 Cargo model was introduced.

The 2.5 and subsequent 3.0-litre turbo-diesel KD engines have a maximum power output of 80 kW (109 PS; 107 hp) at 3400 rpm and 106 kW (144 PS; 142 hp) at 3400 rpm and maximum torque of 260 N⋅m (192 lb⋅ft) at 1600–2600 rpm and 300 N⋅m (221 lb⋅ft) at 1200–3200 rpm, respectively. The 2.0 L and 2.7 L TR petrol engines have a maximum output of 100 kW (136 PS; 134 hp) at 5600 rpm and 118 kW (160 PS; 158 hp) at 5200 rpm, respectively and a maximum torque of 182 N⋅m (134 lb⋅ft) and 243 N⋅m (179 lb⋅ft); both being achieved at 4000 rpm. In November 2017, the Japanese market HiAce Van and RegiusAce came fitted with the 2.8 L 1GD-FTV engine mated to a 6-speed automatic transmission generating a power output of 111 kW (151 PS; 149 hp) at 3600 rpm and 300 N⋅m (221 lb⋅ft) of torque from 1000 to 3400 rpm. This supplanted the 1KD-FTV. With the same 2.8-litre engine and 6 speed automatic transmission, Toyota introduced the HiAce to India in February 2021 as a CBU import in the GL trim with the 5L-E engine as fitted in the versions sold in Myanmar. Only 55 units were sold and the Vellfire was launched in India shortly after the initial sale. 68 kW (92 PS; 91 hp) at 4000 rpm and 197 N⋅m (145 lb⋅ft) of torque at 2400 rpm

The fifth-generation HiAce was launched in Indonesia in September 2012, marking the return of the HiAce to Indonesia since the second generation. Powered by the 2.5 L 2KD-FTV, it was available in high-roof models only. In April 2022, Toyota Indonesia replaced the 2.5 L Euro 2 2KD-FTV engine with the 3.0 L 1KD-FTV. Power is rated at 136 PS (100 kW) at 3400 rpm and 30.6 kg⋅m (300 N⋅m) of torque at 1200-2400 rpm.

On Japan's list of the most commonly stolen vehicles, as of November 2008, the HiAce resides in the first place. Because of a lack of a theft immobilizer, it is fairly easy to steal a HiAce, as opposed to much more valuable SUVs and sports cars, which have more sophisticated theft deterrent systems.

The first facelift HiAce was released in April 2012. Then the second facelift model was released in 2013. Featuring a redesigned front fascia.

Following the launch of the H300 series, the H200 series continues to be sold in certain markets as of April 2020, including in Japan, Philippines, Pakistan, Malaysia, Singapore, South Africa, Bangladesh, Sri Lanka, Indonesia, Egypt and Kuwait. In 2020, Toyota Philippines introduced a variant of the H200 Commuter Van called the Hiace Cargo, which removes the rear seats but retains rear air conditioners and rear windows.

In Japan, the third and final facelift of the H200 HiAce was released in January 2026.

=== Gallery ===
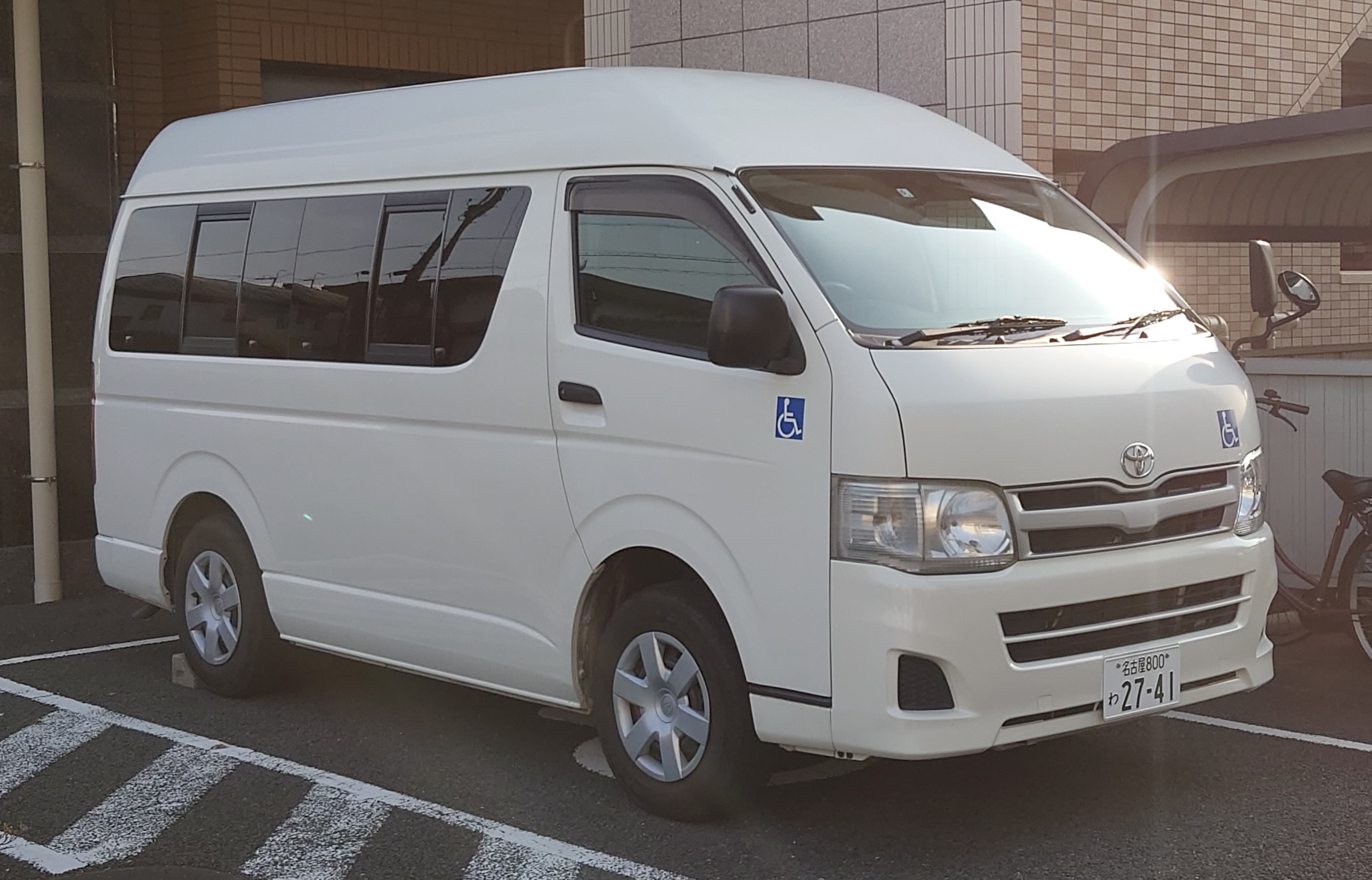
HiAce (high-roof; first facelift, Japan)

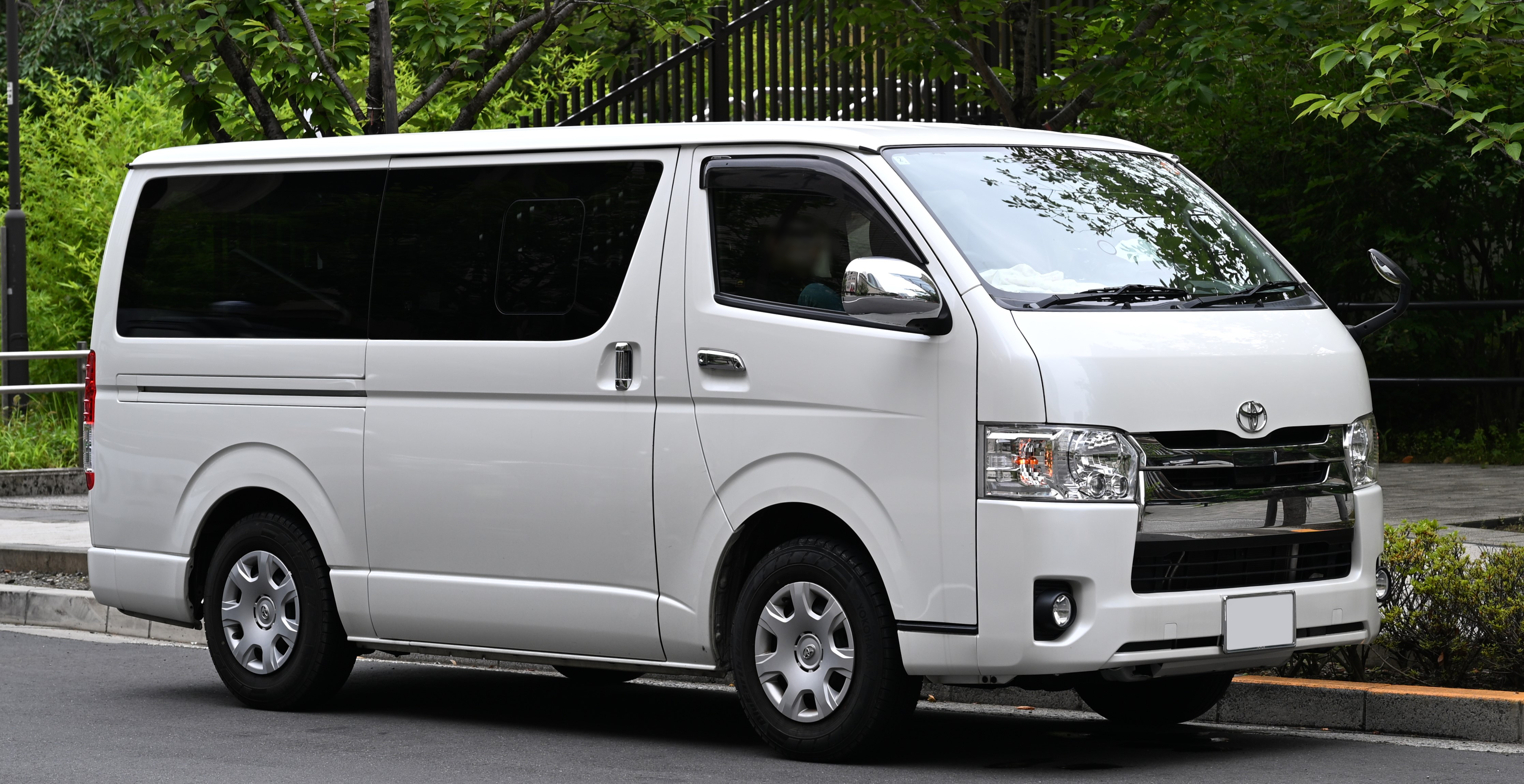
HiAce Super GL (second facelift)

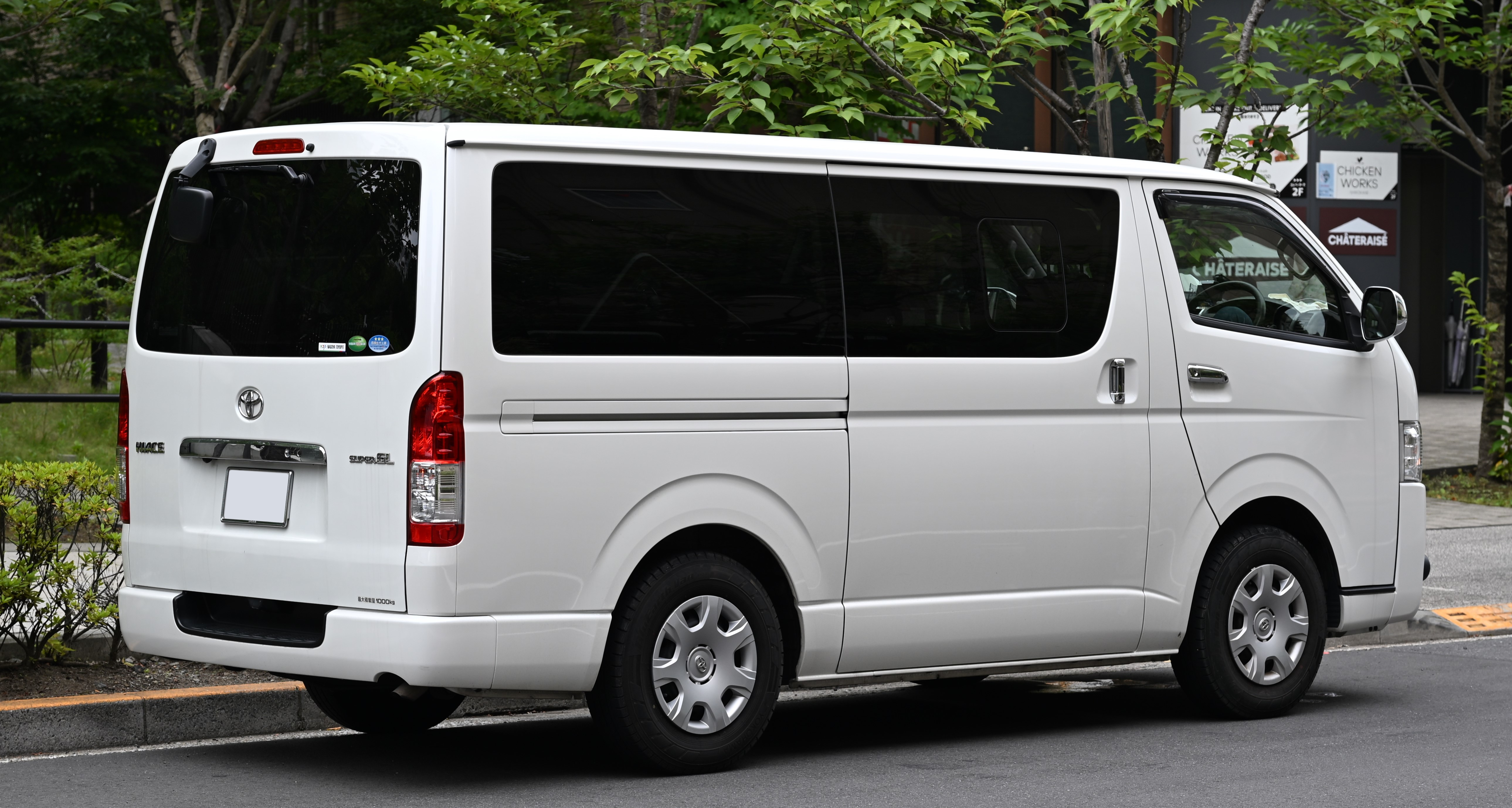
HiAce Super GL (second facelift)

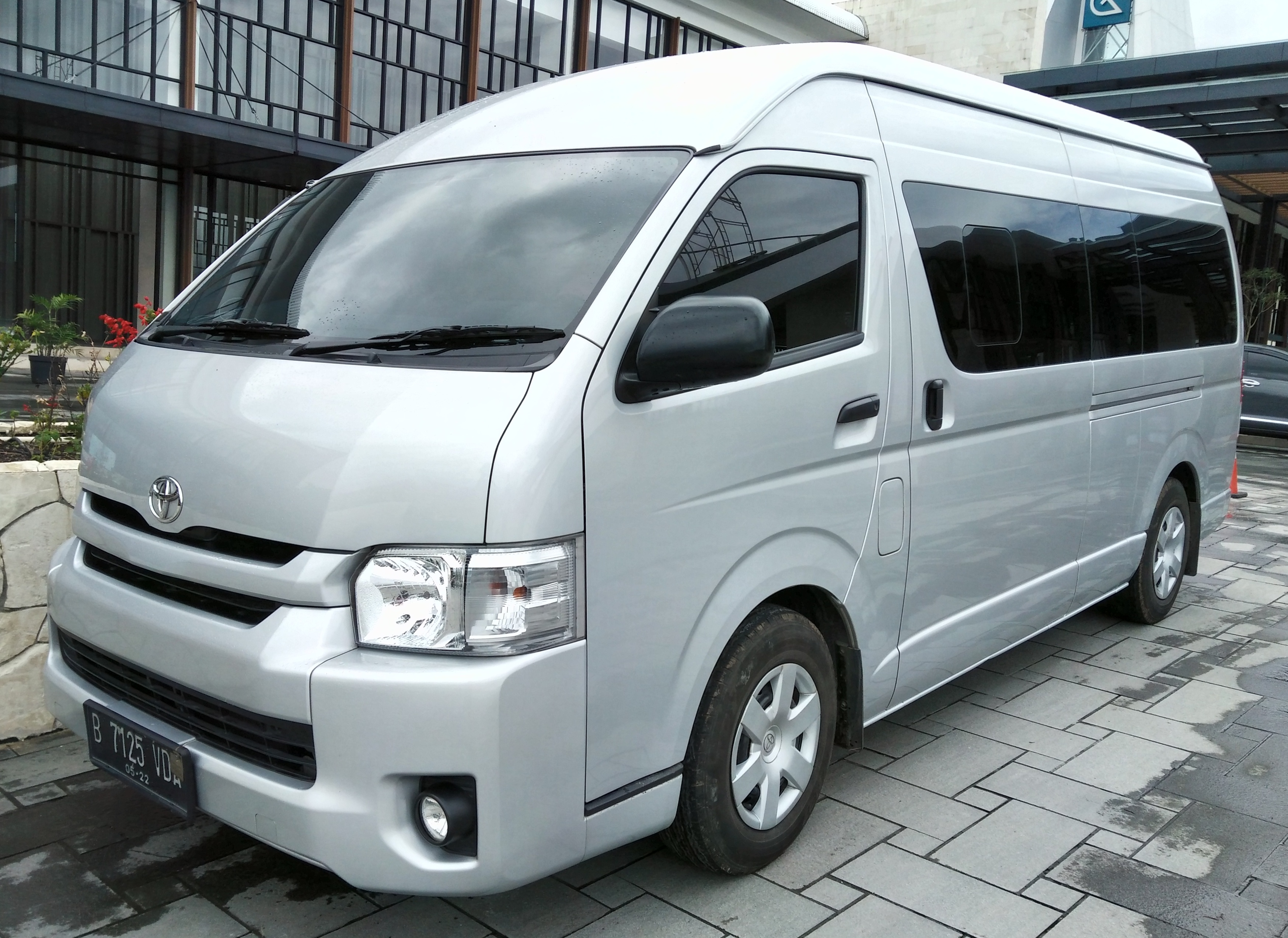
HiAce Commuter (high-roof; second facelift, Indonesia)

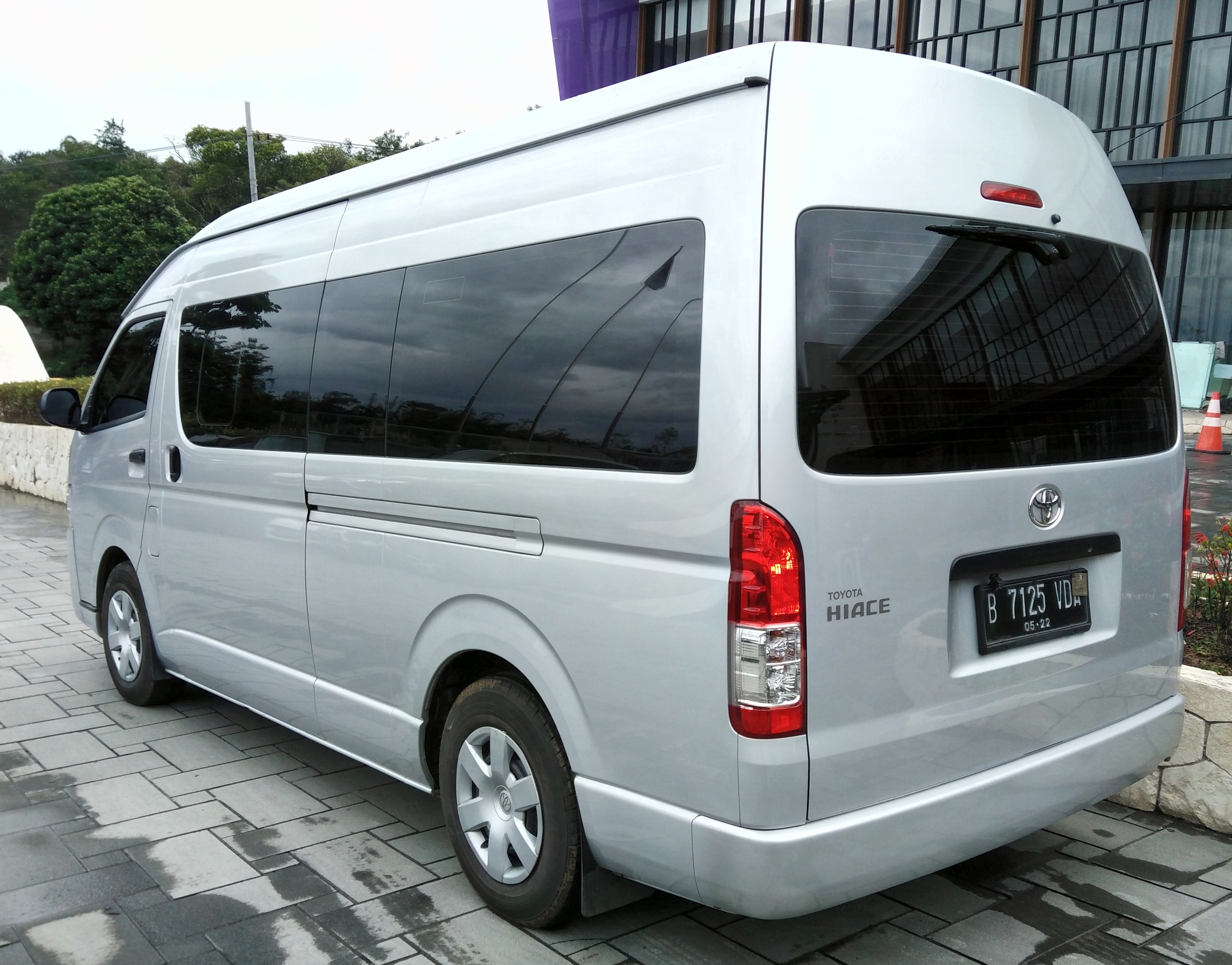
HiAce Commuter (high-roof; second facelift, Indonesia)

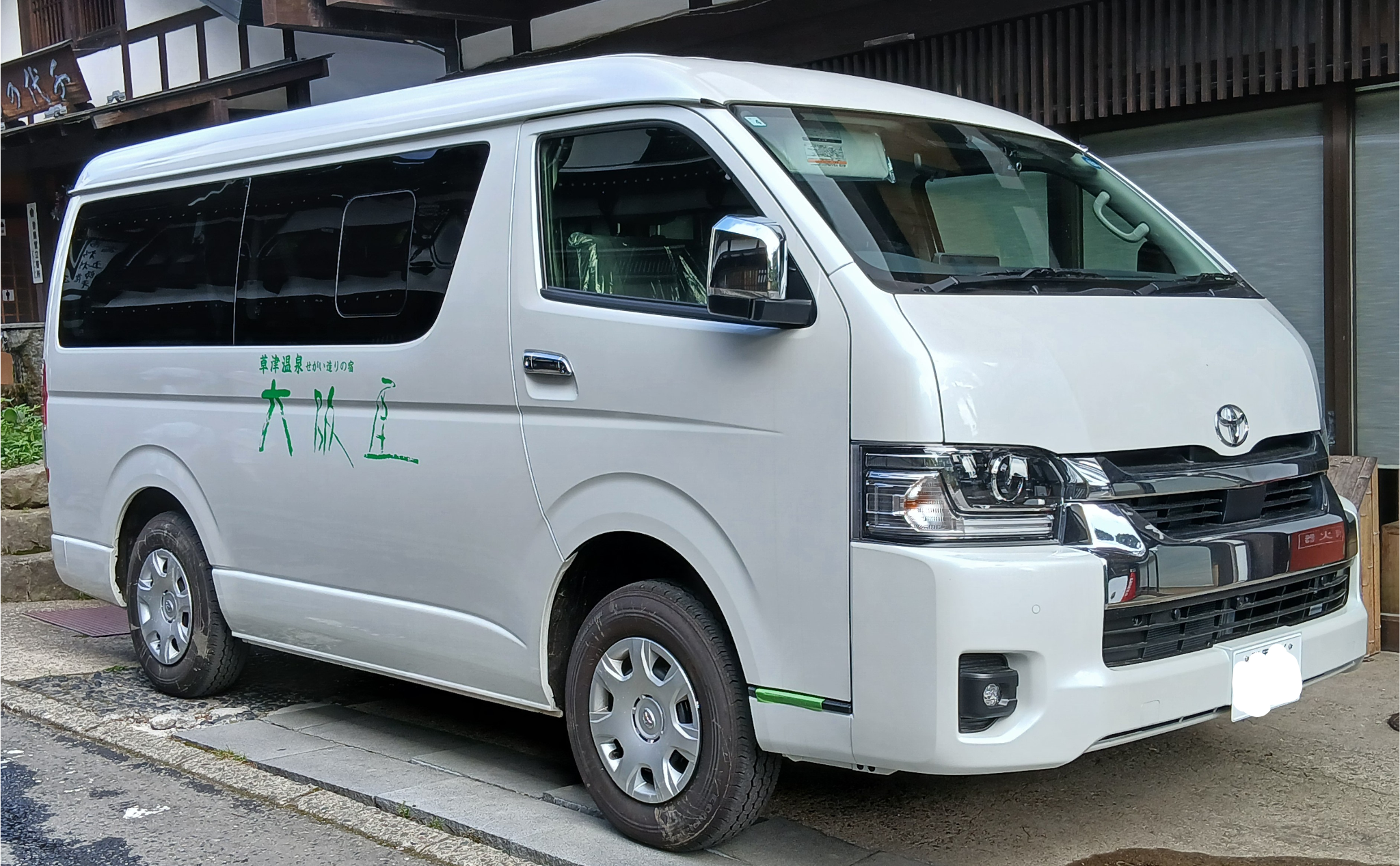
HiAce (third facelift)

=== RegiusAce ===
The second generation of the RegiusAce was completely restyled. Transmission choices are a 5-speed manual transmission or a 4-speed automatic, with the gearshift lever integrated into the instrument panel so as to allow front seat passengers access to the rear of the vehicle from the inside. A moderate restyle was completed in November 2005. It is only available at Netz Toyota dealers. It was discontinued in 2020 due to integration of all Toyota stores across Japan.

=== Mazda Bongo Brawny ===
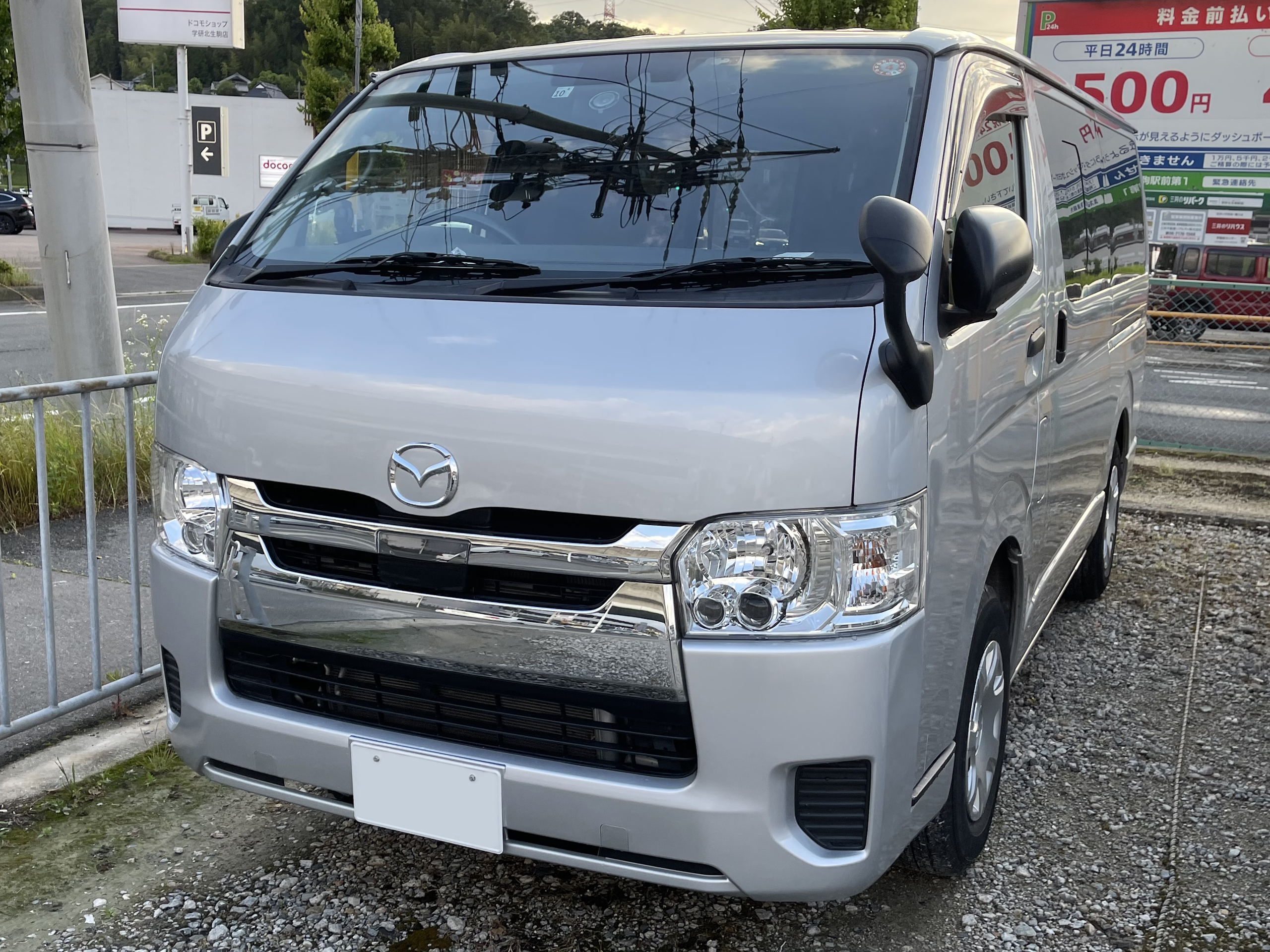
Mazda Bongo Brawny

In 2019, Mazda introduced a badge-engineered version of the H200 as the new Bongo Brawny. Unlike its predecessors, the new Bongo is meant for commercial purposes. It is offered in DX and GL trims.

The Brawny is equipped with collision avoidance package as standard with forward collision warning with automatic braking, automatic high beam, and lane departure warning.

=== Safety ===
ANCAP test results* Toyota Hiace LWB van (2005)
Test	Score
Overall	3 /5 stars
Frontal offset	7.50/16
Side impact	16/16
Pole	Not Assessed
Seat belt reminders	0/3
Whiplash protection	Not Assessed
Pedestrian protection	Poor
Electronic stability control	Not Available

ANCAP test results* Toyota Hiace LWB van sold in New Zealand (2011)
Test	Score
Overall	4 /5 stars
Frontal offset	8.50/16
Side impact	16/16
Pole	Not Assessed
Seat belt reminders	0/3
Whiplash protection	Not Assessed
Pedestrian protection	Poor
Electronic stability control	Not Available

ANCAP test results* Toyota Hiace LWB van (2011)
Test	Score
Overall	4 /5 stars
Frontal offset	8.50/16
Side impact	16/16
Pole	Not Assessed
Seat belt reminders	0/3
Whiplash protection	Not Assessed
Pedestrian protection	Poor
Electronic stability control	Not Available

== Sixth generation (H300; 2019) ==
Sixth generation
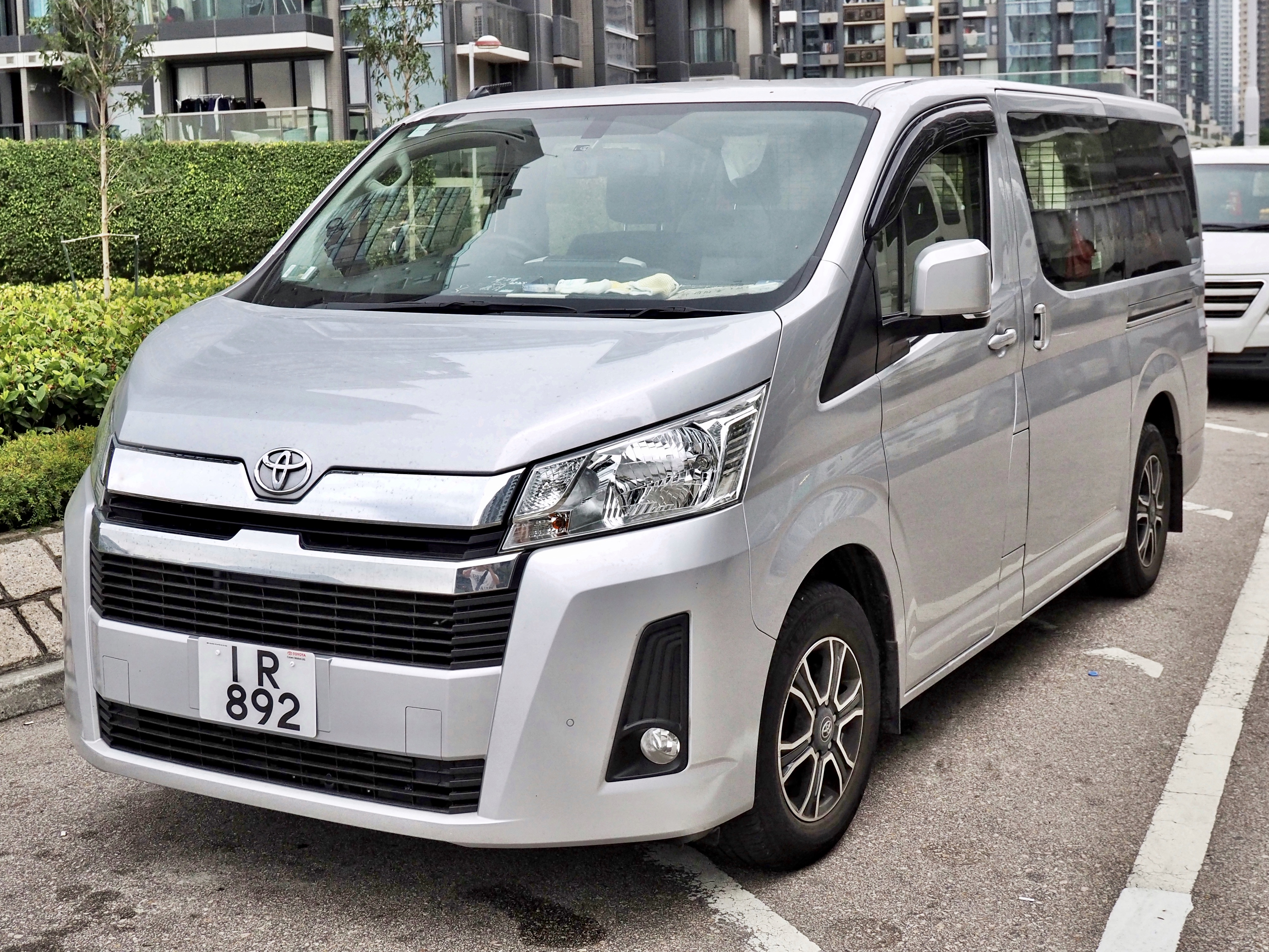

Overview
- Model code: H300
- Also called: Toyota GranAce (Japan, 2019–2024); Toyota Commuter (Thailand); Toyota Majesty (Thailand, Bhutan, Myanmar and Brunei); Toyota Granvia (Taiwan, Australasia, Southeast Asia and Middle East); Toyota Quantum (South Africa)
- Production: 2019–present
- Assembly: Japan: Inabe, Mie (Toyota Auto Body); Kakamigahara, Gifu (Gifu Auto Body); Thailand: Thepharak (Toyota Auto Works); Argentina: Zárate
- Designer: Takuo Ishikawa

Body and chassis
- Body style: 4/5-door van/minibus
- Layout: Front-engine, rear-wheel-drive

Powertrain
- Engine: Petrol: 2.7 L 2TR-FE I4; 3.5 L 7GR-FKS V6; Diesel: 2.8 L 1GD-FTV I4
- Transmission: 5-speed manual; 6-speed RC60J manual; 6-speed AC60 automatic

Dimensions
- Wheelbase: 2,570 mm (101.2 in) (I4 Standard Roof) LWB; 3,110 mm (122.4 in) (I4 High Roof) SLWB; 3,210 mm (126.4 in) (Normal/Standard Roof, GranAce/Granvia/Majesty/Super Grandia) LWB; 3,860 mm (152.0 in) (Long/High Roof) SLWB
- Length: 5,380 mm (211.8 in) (I4 High Roof) SLWB; 5,265 mm (207.3 in) (Normal/Standard Roof) LWB; 5,915 mm (232.9 in) (Long/High Roof) SLWB; 5,300 mm (208.7 in) (GranAce/Granvia/Majesty/Super Grandia) LWB
- Width: 1,880 mm (74.0 in) (I4 High Roof) SLWB; 1,950 mm (76.8 in) (Normal/Standard Roof, Long/High Roof) LWB & SLWB; 1,970 mm (77.6 in) (GranAce/Granvia/Majesty/Super Grandia) LWB
- Height: 2,285 mm (90.0 in) (I4 High Roof) SLWB; 1,990 mm (78.3 in) (Normal/Standard Roof, GranAce/Granvia/Majesty/Super Grandia) LWB; 2,280 mm (89.8 in) (Long/High Roof) SLWB
- Curb weight: 1,715–2,290 kg (3,781–5,049 lb)

Chronology
- Predecessor: Toyota Previa/Estima (Japan, Taiwan and Middle East, for GranAce and Granvia); Toyota Ventury (Thailand, for Majesty); Toyota Tarago (Australia, for Granvia)

The sixth generation HiAce made its global debut on 18 February 2019 in the Philippines. It uses a front hood/bonnet arrangement instead of a cab-over design, hence a departure from the design language of its predecessors. Its development was led by Toyota chief engineer Takuo Ishikawa.

The sixth generation HiAce is available in two engine options: a turbocharged 2.8 L 1GD-FTV inline-four diesel engine or a naturally aspirated 3.5 L 7GR-FKS V6 petrol engine.

=== Markets ===
==== Australia ====
The sixth generation HiAce was released in Australia on 28 May 2019 and is offered in five grades: LWB Van, LWB Crew Van, SLWB Van, SLWB Commuter and SLWB Commuter GL. The 3.5L V6 engine option is only available on LWB & SLWB grades. A 6-speed manual transmission is only available in the LWB Van grade for both petrol and diesel engines.

==== Brazil ====
The sixth generation HiAce is sold in Brazil since September 2025. Initially in one grade (Minibus AT DX), there are plans to bring panel van grade in November 2025, and the ambulance version is depending on local homologation. The only engine option is the 2.8-litre diesel engine matted to a 6-speed automatic transmission.

==== Indonesia ====
The sixth generation HiAce is sold in Indonesia as the HiAce Premio (based on long/high roof body model), which was introduced at the 27th Gaikindo Indonesia International Auto Show in July 2019.

==== Philippines ====
The sixth generation HiAce is offered in 5 grade levels: 15-seater Commuter Deluxe, 12-seater GL Grandia Monotone and 2-Tone, 14-seater GL Grandia Tourer, 10-seater Super Grandia and Super Grandia Elite. The Super Grandia grade are sold as the Granvia/Majesty in other markets. All trim levels are powered by the 2.8-litre turbodiesel engine mated to either a 6-speed manual or automatic transmissions.

In March 2021, Toyota Motor Philippines introduced the HiAce as a premium taxi service in Cebu on H300 series models.

In July 2025, the Commuter Deluxe Cargo variant was added to the lineup. Similar to the H200-based Commuter Cargo, the rear seats are removed but retains the rear air conditioners and rear windows.

==== Mexico ====
The sixth generation HiAce was released in the Mexican market in late August 2019.

==== Thailand ====
The sixth generation HiAce was launched in Thailand on 10 June 2019. There are three models of the HiAce in Thailand: HiAce (Normal Roof), Commuter (High Roof), and Majesty. The standard roof HiAce for Thai market is available in Eco (Panel Van) and GL grades, both with 6-speed manual transmission. The High-roof Commuter is available with both manual and automatic transmissions. The Majesty was launched on 16 August 2019, replacing the Ventury. It is offered in Standard, Premium and Grande grades, Toyota Safety Sense is standard on the Grande grade.

In January 2023, the automatic transmission option was added for the HiAce GL grade.

=== Gallery ===
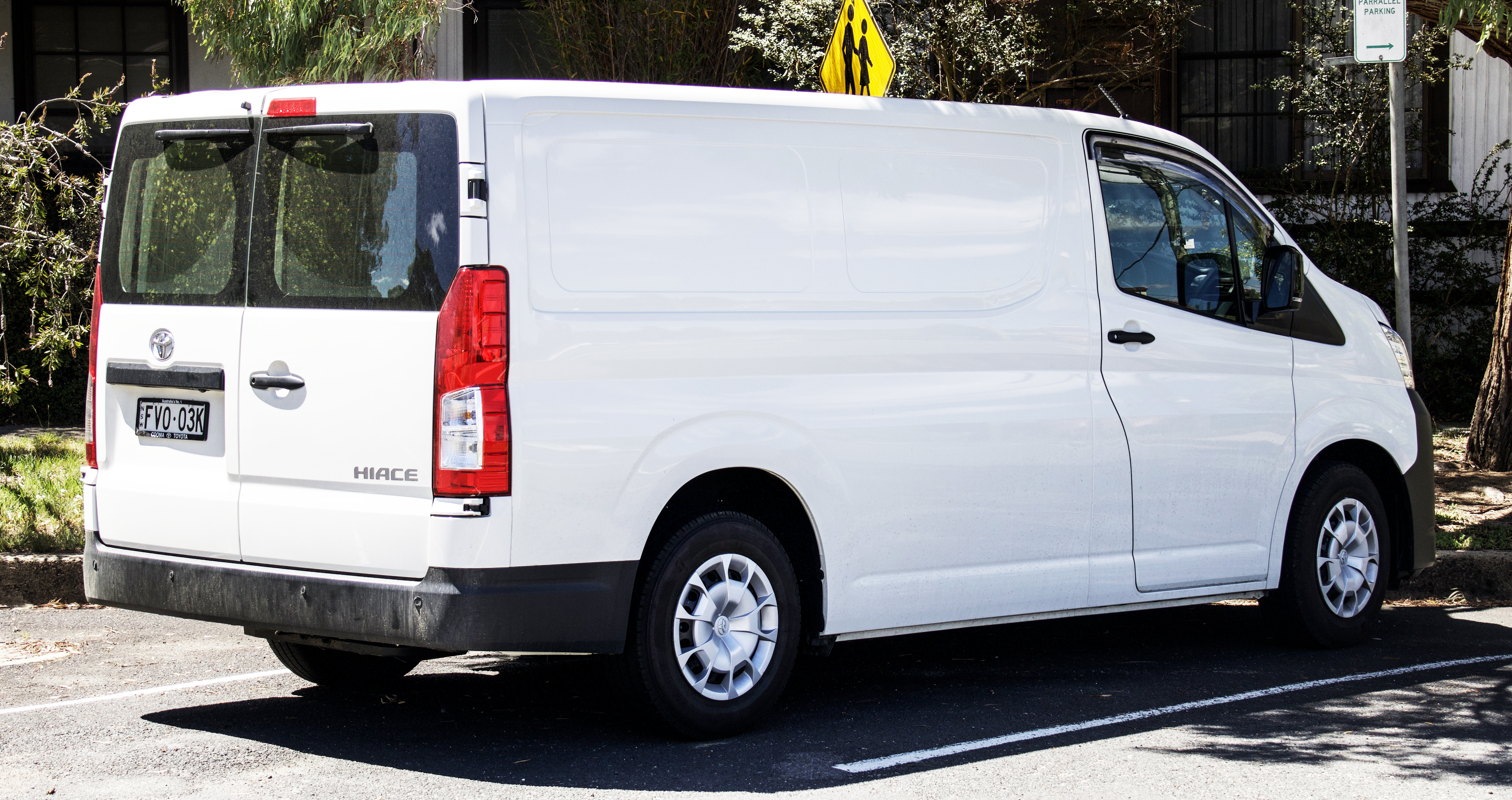
Rear view (with barn doors)

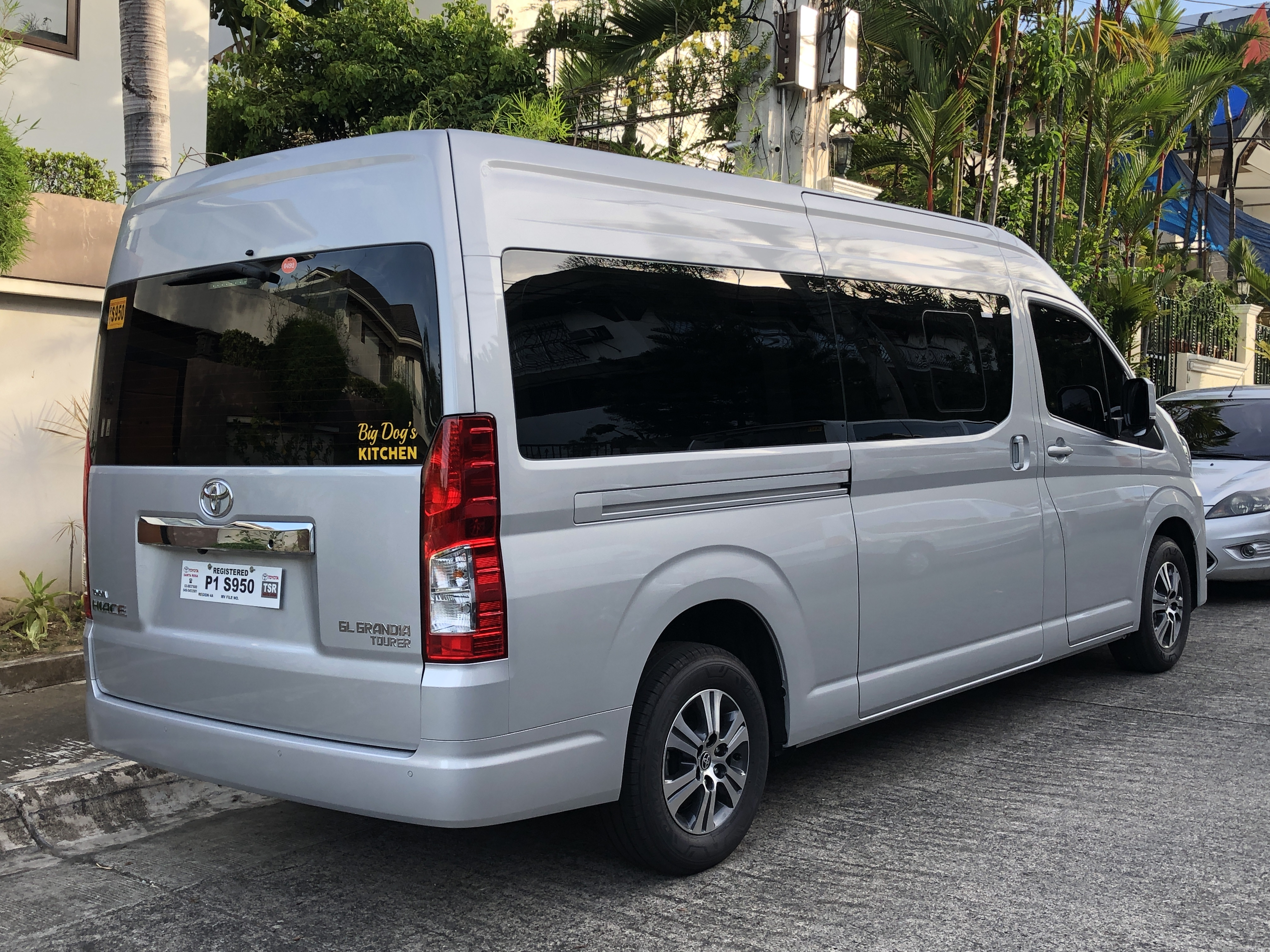
Rear view

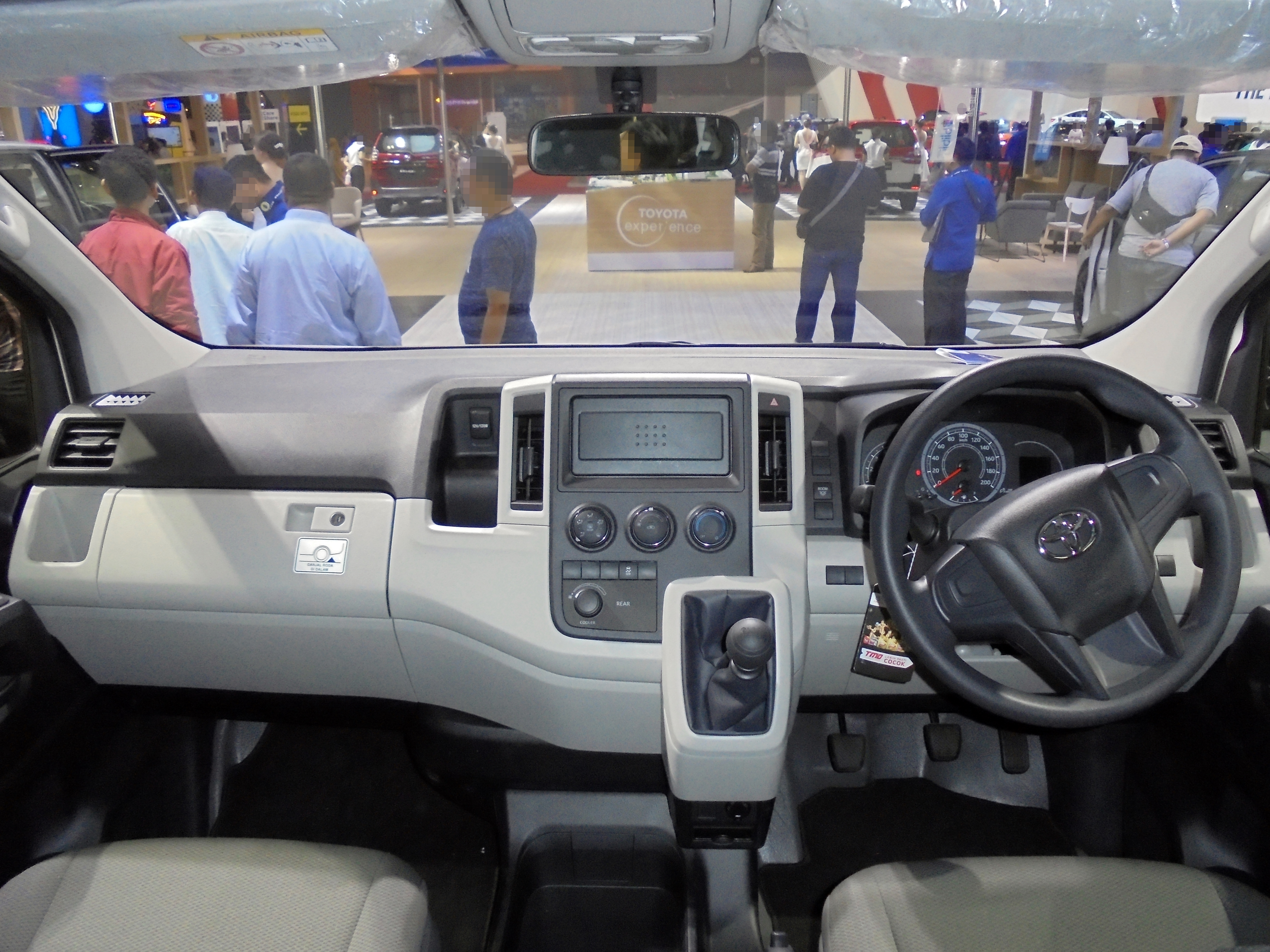
Interior

=== GranAce/Granvia/Majesty/HiAce Super Grandia/HiAce VIP/Quantum VX ===
A more luxurious passenger version of the HiAce, called Granvia, was released on 21 May 2019 and is sold in Taiwan and Australia (replacing the Tarago). The Granvia was also released in Thailand as the Majesty on 16 August 2019, replacing the Ventury, followed by the HiAce Super Grandia in the Philippines on 19 August 2019. It is also sold in Japan as the GranAce (Japanese: トヨタ・グランエース, Hepburn: Toyota Guran'ēsu), which was announced on 8 October 2019 and unveiled at the 46th Tokyo Motor Show through October to November 2019. It went on sale on 16 December 2019, and was discontinued in October 2024 due to poor sales. The Granvia was launched in the United Arab Emirates on 10 October 2019 and is powered by the 3.5-litre V6 engine. It was also introduced in Russia as the HiAce VIP on 25 October 2019.

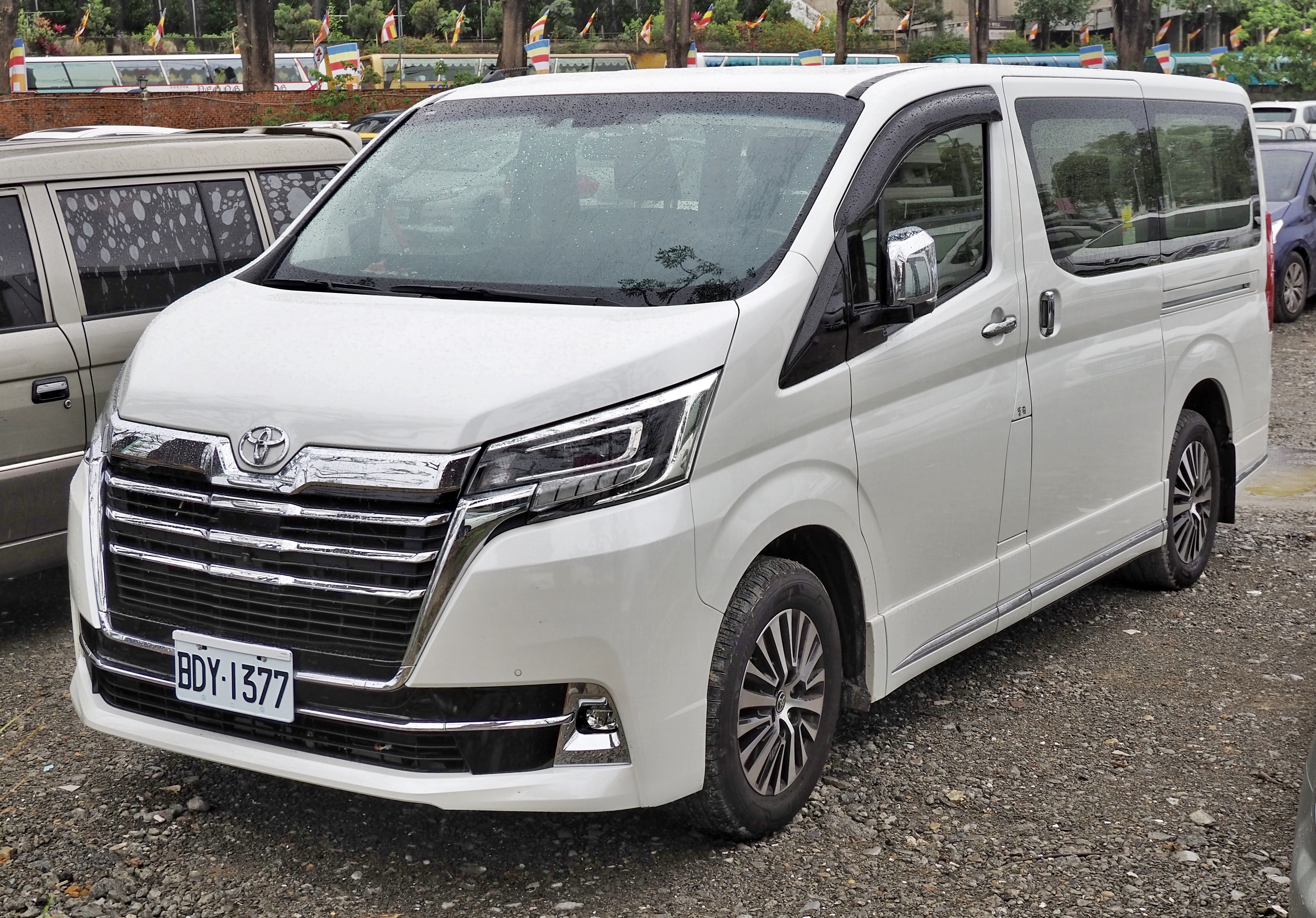
2019 Toyota Granvia Premium

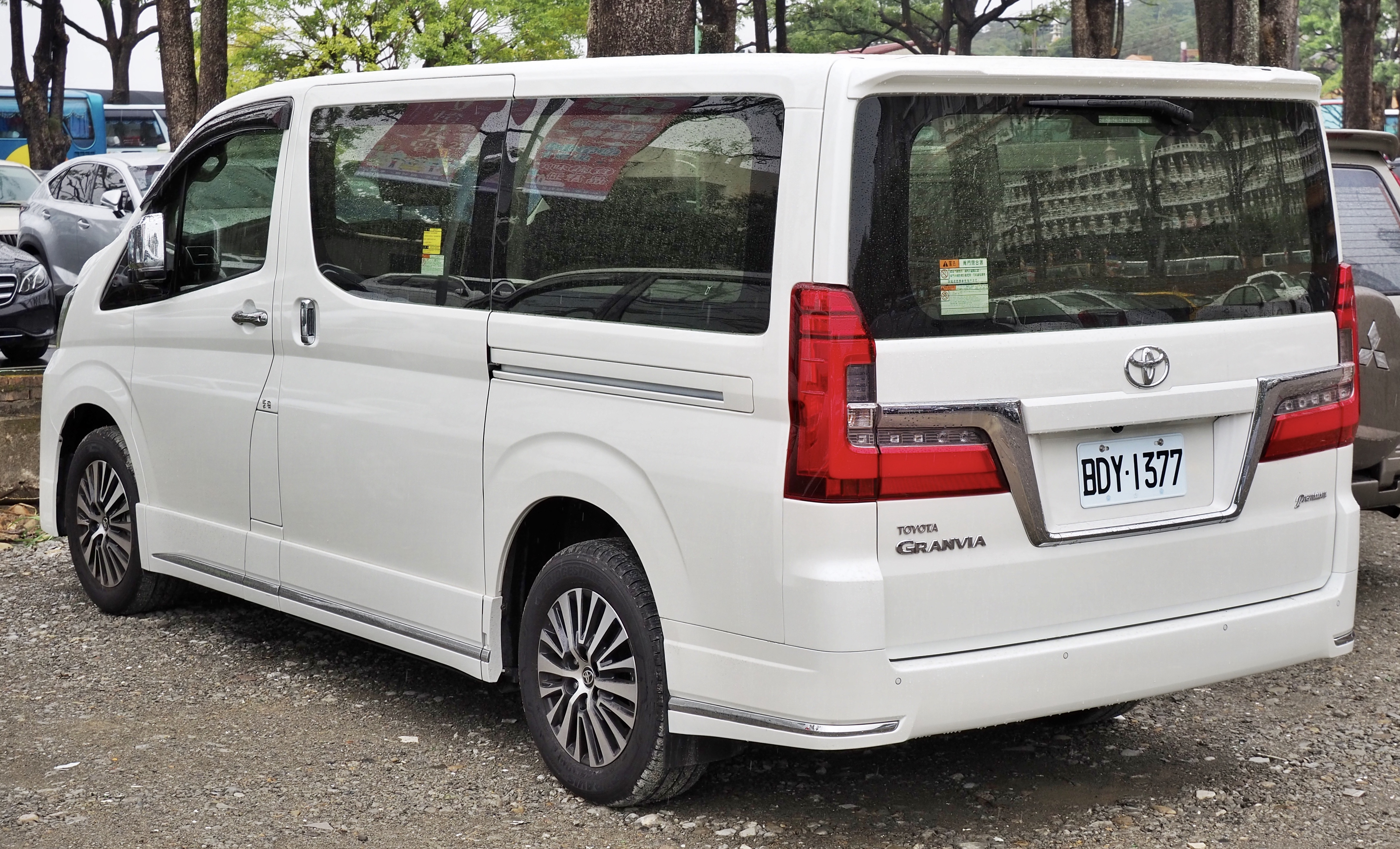
2019 Toyota Granvia Premium

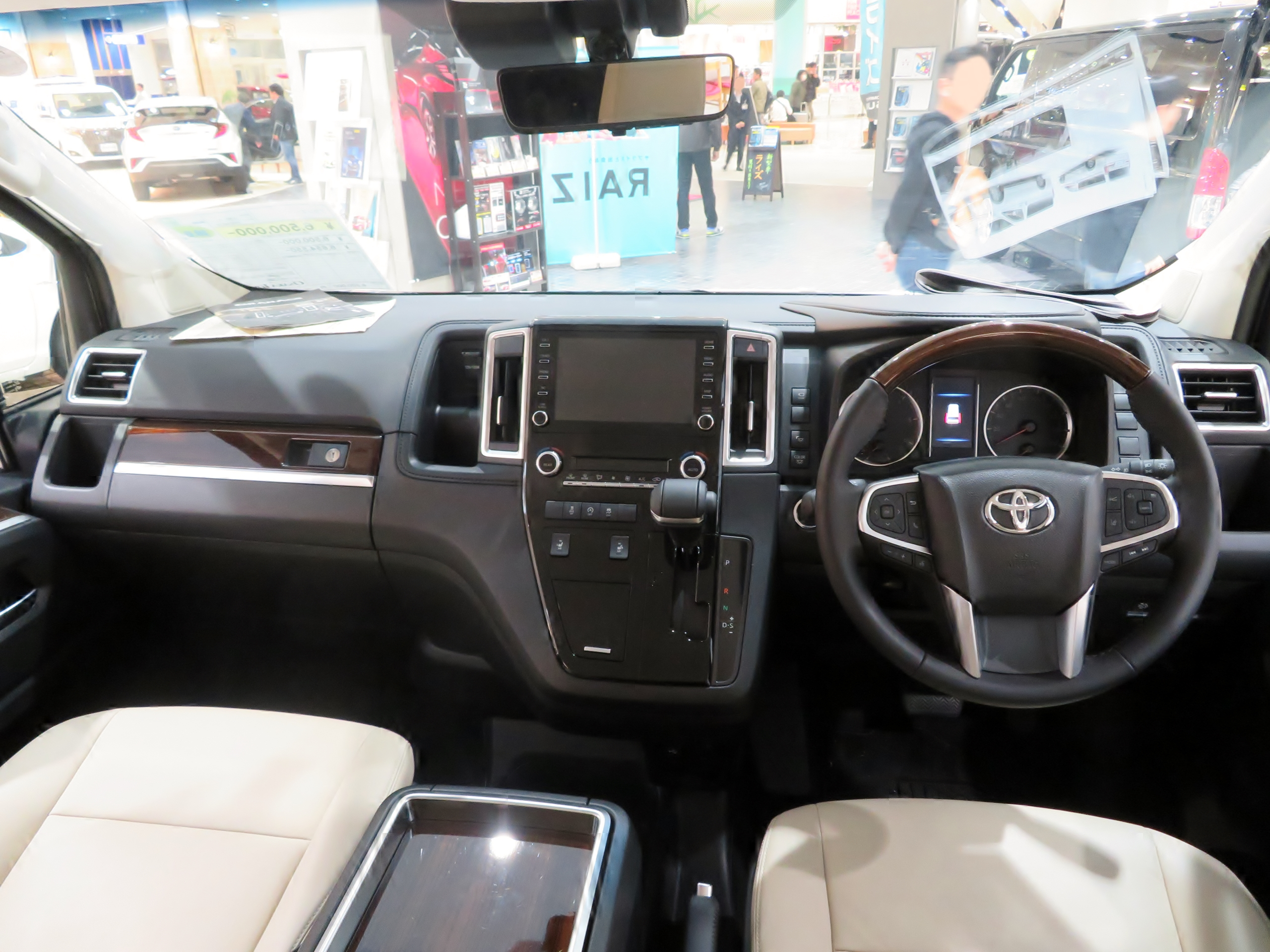
2019 Toyota GranAce Premium interior

=== Engines ===
Petrol engine
Engine	Power	Torque
2.7 L 2TR-FE DOHC 16-valve I4 with Dual VVT-i	120 kW (163 PS; 161 hp) at 5,200 rpm	244 N⋅m (180 lb⋅ft) at 4,000 rpm
3.5 L 7GR-FKS DOHC 24-valve D-4S V6 with Dual VVT-i	207 kW (281 PS; 278 hp) at 6,000 rpm	351 N⋅m (259 lb⋅ft) at 4,600 rpm
Diesel engine
Engine	Power	Torque
2.8 L 1GD-FTV DOHC 16-valve common rail I4 with VGT	115 kW (156 PS; 154 hp) at 3,600 rpm 120 kW (163 PS; 161 hp) at 3,600 rpm 130 kW (177 PS; 174 hp) at 3,400 rpm	420 N⋅m (310 lb⋅ft) at 1,600–2,200 rpm 420 N⋅m (310 lb⋅ft) at 1,600–2,200 rpm 450 N⋅m (332 lb⋅ft) at 1,600–2,400 rpm

=== Safety ===
ASEAN NCAP test results Toyota Majesty (2019)
Test	Points
Overall:	5 /5 stars
Adult occupant:	46.31
Child occupant:	22.93
Safety assist:	20.27

ANCAP test results* Toyota Hiace all van & crew van variants (2019, aligned with Euro NCAP)
Test	Points	%
Overall:	5 /5 stars	
Adult occupant:	35.7	94%
Child occupant:	43.2	88%
Pedestrian:	40.6	84%
Safety assist:	10	77%

ANCAP test results Toyota Hiace ll van & crew van variants (2025, aligned with Euro NCAP)
Test	Points	%
Overall:	5 /5 stars	
Adult occupant:	32.27	80%
Child occupant:	42.59	86%
Pedestrian:	55.23	87%
Safety assist:	14.58	81%

ANCAP test results* Toyota Granvia (2019, aligned with Euro NCAP)
Test	Points	%
Overall:	5 /5 stars	
Adult occupant:	35.7	94%
Child occupant:	43.2	88%
Pedestrian:	40.6	84%
Safety assist:	10.3	79%

ANCAP test results Toyota Hiace all van variants (2020)
Overall
Grading:	77% (Gold)

ANCAP test results All van & crew van variants (2025)
Overall
Grading:	90% (Platinum)
