= Toyota LiteAce =

Car model

Toyota LiteAce/TownAce
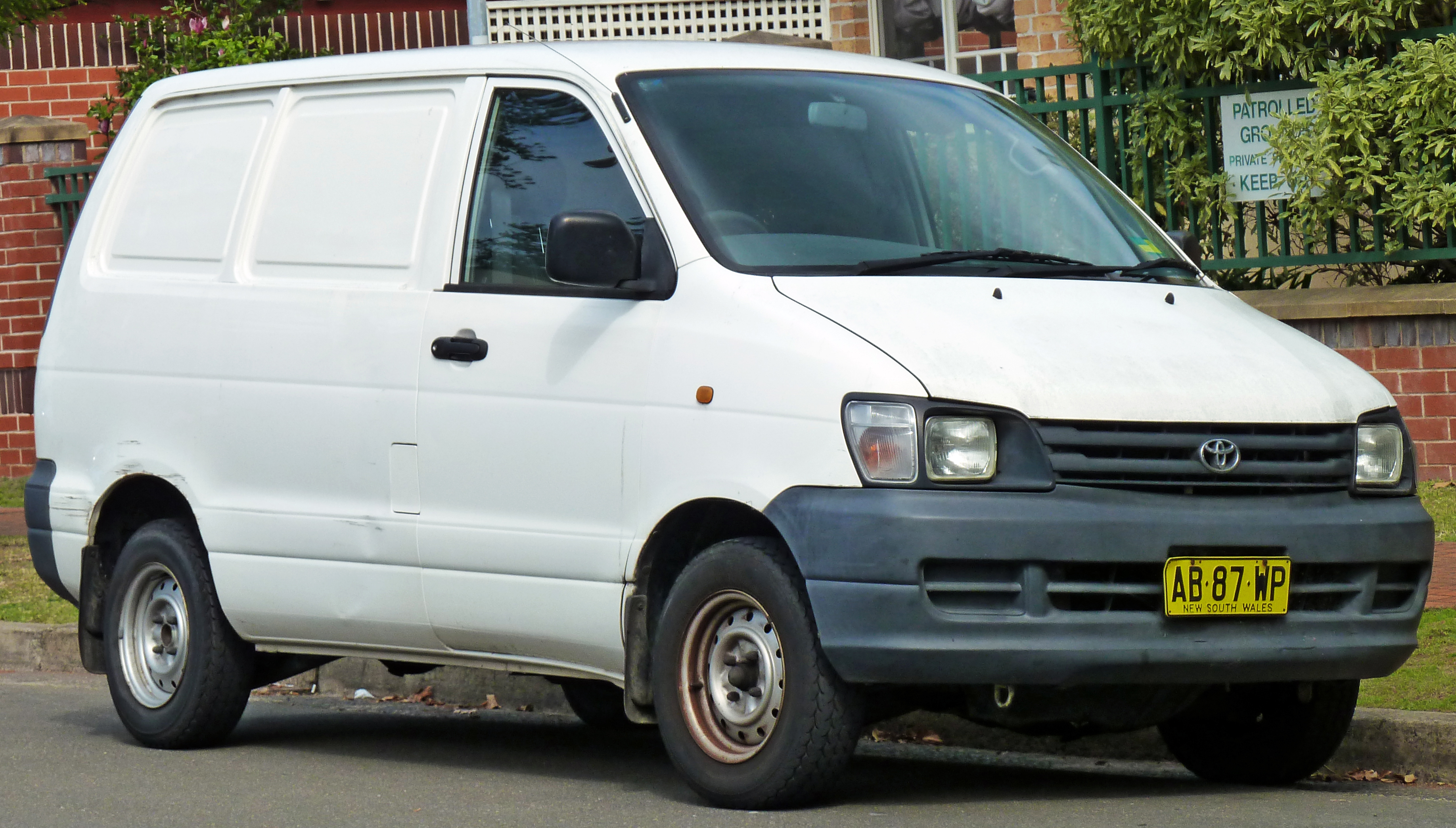
- 1997–1999 Toyota TownAce (KR42)

Overview
- Manufacturer: Toyota (1970–2007); Daihatsu (2008–present)
- Also called: Toyota TownAce (1976–present); Toyota MasterAce Surf (1982–1992); Daihatsu Delta; Daihatsu Gran Max (S400; 2008–present); Mazda Bongo (S400; 2020–present)
- Production: 1970–present

Body and chassis
- Class: Light commercial vehicle; Compact van
- Body style: 2-door pickup; 4-door van/wagon; 5-door van/wagon
- Layout: Front-engine, rear-wheel-drive; Front-engine, four-wheel-drive

The Toyota LiteAce and TownAce are a line of light commercial and derivative passenger vans produced by the Japanese car manufacturer Toyota. These vehicles originally utilized the cab-over-engine configuration, although since 1996 a semi-cab-over arrangement has featured instead. The LiteAce launched in 1970 as light-duty truck, with commercial and van/wagon body variants added in 1971. In 1976, Toyota released the larger TownAce van/wagon that derived from the LiteAce; a TownAce truck arrived later in 1978. Between 1982 and 1992, the series accommodated the MasterAce Surf—an upscale TownAce passenger wagon.

The two model lines existed separately until 1982 when TownAce trucks became rebadged LiteAce trucks—then in 1992 LiteAce vans became rebranded TownAce vans—thus unifying the once separate vehicle lines. In Japan, the LiteAce retailed at Toyota Auto Store dealerships, with the TownAce sold at Toyota Corolla Store dealerships. The LiteAce and TownAce have been commonly exported to Africa, Asia and Australia. Over the years, select LiteAce/TownAce models have also been available with Daihatsu Delta badging in Japan. Originally sold as the Delta 750 based on the LiteAce truck, later versions have been badged Delta Wide and based on the TownAce van. For the final Delta retailed between 1996 and 2001, the "Wide" suffix disappeared.

The LiteAce followed the introduction of the more compact MiniAce and larger HiAce in 1967, acting as an intermediacy between these two models in size and carrying capacity. By the mid-1970s, the MiniAce had been retired and the HiAce had grown, thus creating a void in the market resumed by the TownAce. The "Ace" moniker references the Toyota ToyoAce medium-duty truck sold starting 1956. The "Lite" in LiteAce refers to its light-duty capability, and the "Town" in TownAce alludes to the suitability of the model for urban areas.

== Timeline ==
Toyota LiteAce, TownAce, MasterAce timeline (Japan), 1970–present
Model	Body style	1970s										1980s										1990s										2000s										2010s										2020s
Model	Body style	0	1	2	3	4	5	6	7	8	9	0	1	2	3	4	5	6	7	8	9	0	1	2	3	4	5	6	7	8	9	0	1	2	3	4	5	6	7	8	9	0	1	2	3	4	5	6	7	8	9	0	1	2	3	4	5	6
LiteAce	Van			M10								M20						M30/M40						R20/R30 rebodied					R40/R50												S400
LiteAce	Truck		M10									M20							M50/M60/M70/M80																						S400
TownAce	Van								R10						R20/R30									R20/R30 rebodied					R40/R50												S400
TownAce	Truck										R10				M20				M50/M60/M70/M80																						S400
MasterAce	Van														R20
Series	Body style	1970s										1980s										1990s										2000s										2010s										2020s
Series	Body style	0	1	2	3	4	5	6	7	8	9	0	1	2	3	4	5	6	7	8	9	0	1	2	3	4	5	6	7	8	9	0	1	2	3	4	5	6	7	8	9	0	1	2	3	4	5	6	7	8	9	0	1	2	3	4	5	6
M	Van			LiteAce (M10)								LiteAce (M20)						LiteAce (M30/M40)
M	Truck		LiteAce (M10)									LiteAce, TownAce (M20)							LiteAce, TownAce (M50/M60/M70/M80)
R	Van								TownAce (R10)						TownAce, MasterAce (R20/R30)									LiteAce, TownAce (R20/R30 rebodied)					LiteAce, TownAce (R40/R50)
R	Truck										TownAce (R10)
S	Van																																								LiteAce, TownAce (S400)
S	Truck																																								LiteAce, TownAce (S400)

== M-series ==
=== 1970–1979 (M10) LiteAce van/truck ===
M10
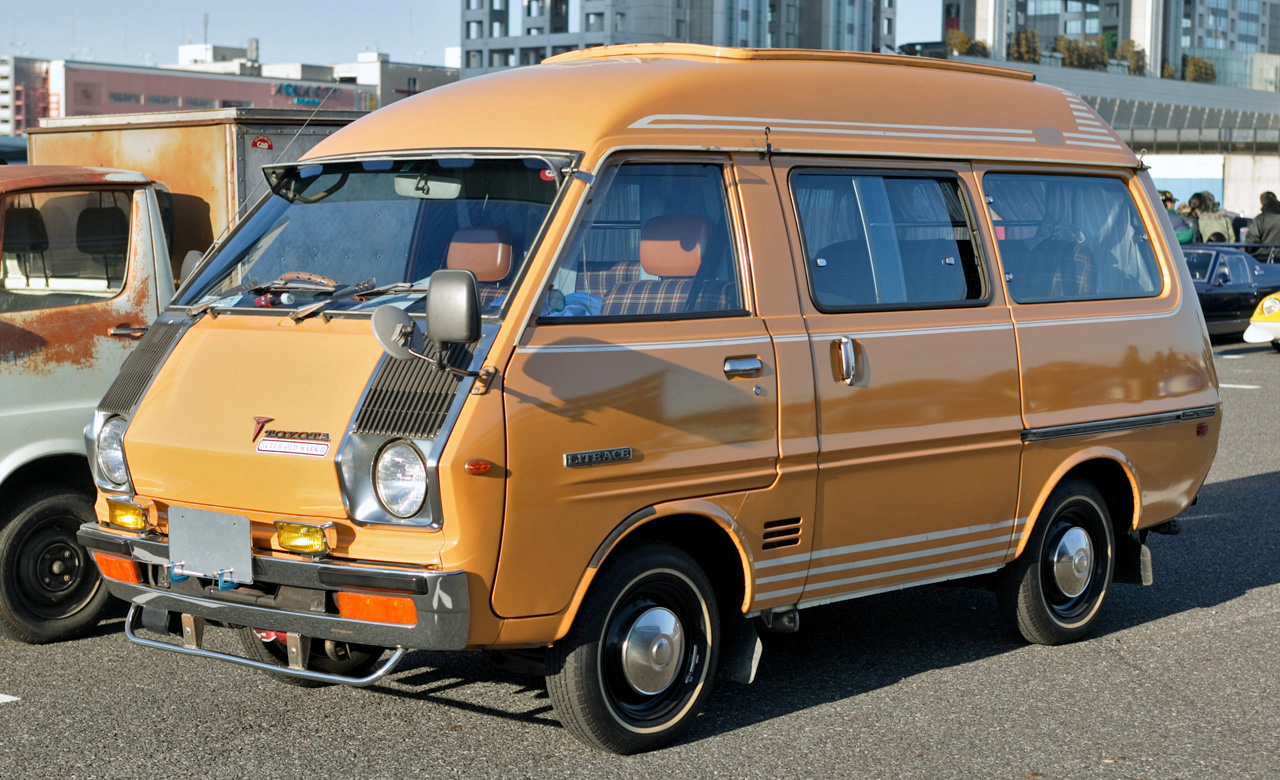
- 1973–1975 LiteAce wagon (KM10G; pre-facelift)

Overview
- Also called: Daihatsu Delta 750 (D10)
- Production: November 1970 – September 1979
- Assembly: Japan: Ikeda, Osaka (Daihatsu); Japan: Kariya, Aichi (Toyota Auto Body); Japan: Toyota, Aichi (Honsha plant)

Body and chassis
- Body style: 2-door truck; 4-door van/wagon; 5-door van/wagon
- Layout: Front-engine, rear-wheel-drive
- Related: Toyota TownAce (R10)

Powertrain
- Engine: 1166 cc 3K I4 (gasoline); 1290 cc 4K-J I4 (gasoline)
- Transmission: 4-speed manual

Dimensions
- Wheelbase: 2,050 mm (80.7 in)
- Length: 3,870 mm (152.4 in) (truck); 3,870 mm (152.4 in) (van/wagon)
- Width: 1,560 mm (61.4 in) (truck); 1,565 mm (61.6 in) (van/wagon)
- Height: 1,780 mm (70.1 in) (truck); 1,740–1,750 mm (68.5–68.9 in) (van/wagon)
- Curb weight: 875–910 kg (1,929–2,006 lb) (truck); 955–990 kg (2,105–2,183 lb) (van/wagon)

Chronology
- Predecessor: Hino Commerce

The LiteAce was developed by Toyota Auto Body, a Toyota's subcontracting subsidiary. Toyota released the first generation LiteAce M10 truck in November 1970 as a larger, upscale model line to sit above the MiniAce that had been introduced in 1967. In effect, LiteAce filled the gap between the smaller MiniAce and larger HiAce whilst keeping within Japanese vehicle size regulations concerning exterior dimensions and engine displacement. This meant that buyers would not be liable for additional taxes for a larger vehicle as they were with the HiAce. LiteAce had also been developed following the growing popularity of affordable cab-over-engine trucks that could carry up to 1,000 kilograms (2,200 lb). Whereas the MiniAce truck had just a 500-kilogram (1,100 lb) payload capacity, the LiteAce truck offered 750 kilograms (1,650 lb) with a three-seat front bench. The cargo bed was available in high- or low-deck.

Toyota later released a one-box van/wagon version of the LiteAce in February 1971. Initially featuring just a single sliding door on the passenger side (curbside), the van/wagon was offered in three seating configurations, of one, two, and three rows—providing for three (van), six (van), and nine (wagon) passengers, respectively. A five-door, dual sliding door version arrived in September 1973 as an option, along with a new high-roof wagon model. The nine-seater wagon was retired in 1975 as it did not satisfy new Japanese emission standards. Later in October 1976, the TownAce (R10) was released—a larger model heavily based on the M10 series LiteAce.

Design-wise, the front-end was distinguished by vertical, black resin grilles above each headlamp. A single chrome recess held both the lamp and the black panel in place; this extended from the windshield to just above the bumper. The van/wagon featured a top-hinged back door, and ornate resin panels were placed above the tail lamps in accordance to the similar design upfront.

The LiteAce was designated KM10 when fitted with the 1166 cc 3K inline-four engine producing 68 PS (50 kW). In February 1978, this was replaced by the larger 1290 cc 4K-J engine (KM11). At the same time, there was a small facelift including a design change to panels above the headlamps and new badging.

Daihatsu Delta 750

This model (truck only) was also marketed in a slightly different badge engineered form as the Daihatsu Delta 750 (D10 series) from March 1971. Still with the 3K engine (and the chassis code KD10), this received a small front grille and other detail differences and was available with most of the same bodywork as the LiteAce. As per the donor Toyota, this was later updated in 1978 to the 4K-J engine (and now receiving the KD11 chassis code). A double cab pickup truck was also available of the KD11.

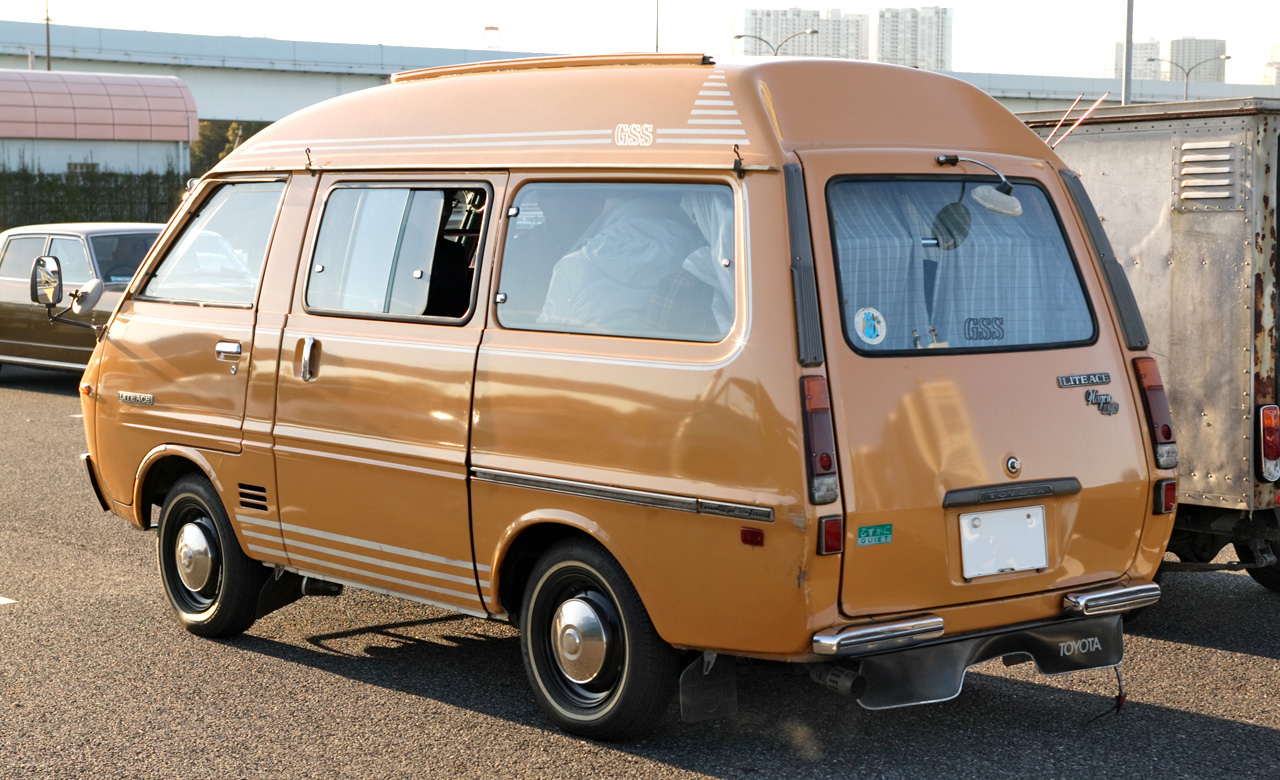
1973–1975 LiteAce wagon (KM10G)

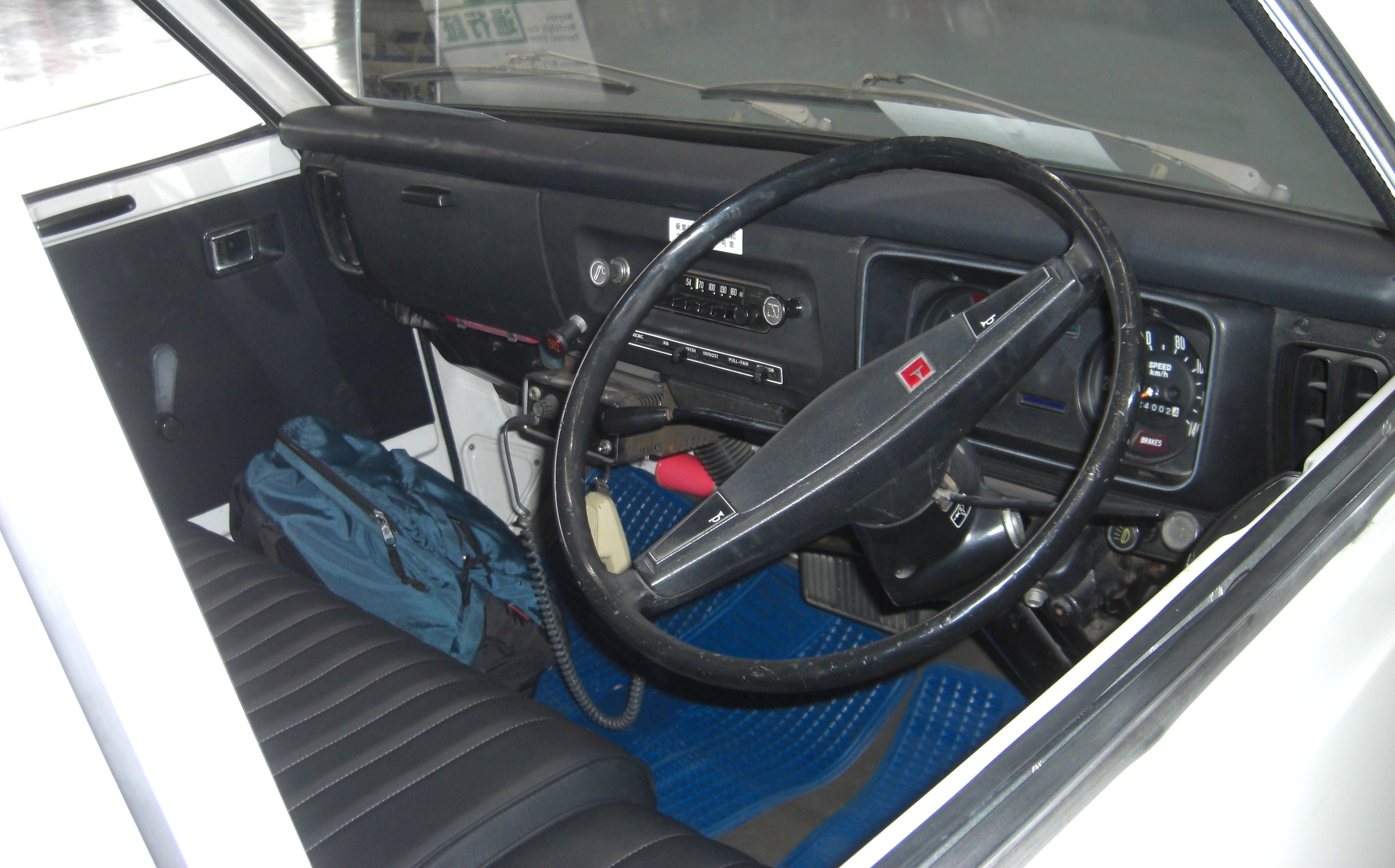
Interior

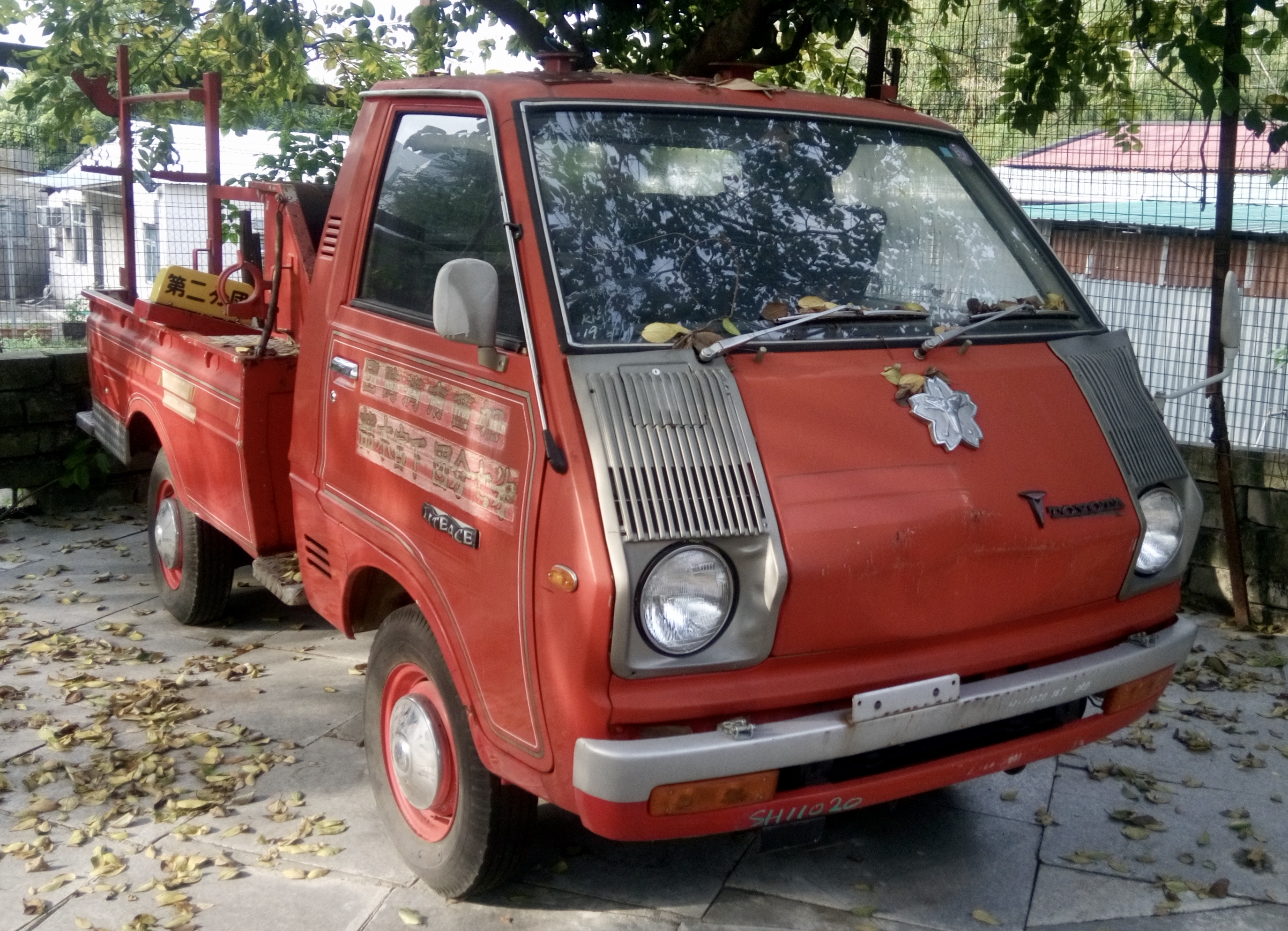
LiteAce M10 pickup

=== 1979–1985 (M20) LiteAce van/truck, TownAce truck ===
M20
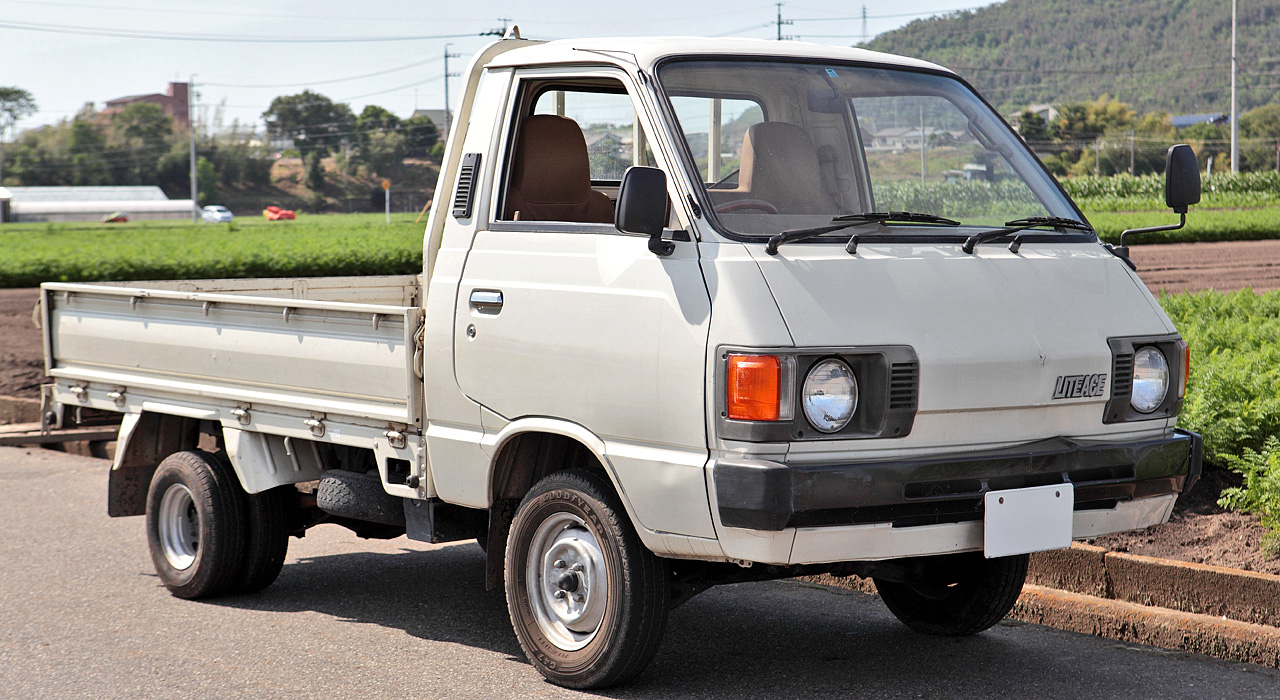
- 1982–1986 LiteAce truck "just low" (KM20; facelift)

Overview
- Also called: Daihatsu Delta 750 (D20)
- Production: October 1979 – August 1985 (van/wagon); October 1979 – September 1986 (truck)
- Assembly: Japan: Toyota, Aichi (Honsha plant; October 1979 – September 1982); Malaysia: Shah Alam (ASSB; 1982–1985)

Body and chassis
- Body style: 2-door truck; 4-door van/wagon
- Layout: Front-engine, rear-wheel-drive

Powertrain
- Engine: Gasoline: 1290 cc 4K-J I4; 1626 cc 1Y I4; 1770 cc 13T-U I4; 1812 cc 2Y I4; Diesel: 1839 cc 1C I4
- Transmission: 4-speed manual; 5-speed manual; 3-speed automatic

Dimensions
- Wheelbase: 2,080 mm (81.9 in)
- Length: 3,920–4,170 mm (154.3–164.2 in) (truck); 3,900–3,940 mm (153.5–155.1 in) (van/wagon)
- Width: 1,625–1,635 mm (64.0–64.4 in) (truck); 1,625 mm (64.0 in) (van/wagon)
- Height: 1,780–1,795 mm (70.1–70.7 in) (truck); 1,735–1,965 mm (68.3–77.4 in) (van/wagon)
- Curb weight: 1,075–1,085 kg (2,370–2,392 lb) (truck); 990–1,120 kg (2,180–2,470 lb) (van/wagon)

Second generation LiteAce van/wagons and trucks were released to the Japanese market in October 1979. Widely exported for the first time, the M20 included seating for up to eight in the wagon with a 2/3/3 arrangement, including fully reclining seatbacks for the second and third rows. Options included dual-zone air conditioners, a four-speaker audio system, and aluminum wheels. The high-roof GXL wagon grade also offered a moonroof option. Truck versions now included a "just low" model—created by fitting 10-inch double tires to the rear wheels (as opposed to 13-inch for the front wheels) to lower the bed floor further.

Toyota fitted the 1290 cc 4K-J inline-four engine (designated KM20 with this engine) with 69 PS (51 kW) to the van and truck initially, with the wagon receiving the 1770 cc 13T-U inline-four (TM20) good for 92 PS (68 kW). Both engines were teamed with a four-speed manual transmission. Updates to the wagon in December 1980 brought an optional three-speed automatic or five-speed manual as well. Further to these revisions, a flagship FXV grade joined the range and new second row seats with a swivel function to face either the forward or backwards position became optional in the wagon. In 1981, a "handy-cab" version that could accommodate a passenger in a wheelchair was introduced. A Montana package arrived in January 1982, complete with removable loft beds and electric curtains. Simultaneously, an eight-seat version with rear-facing second-row seats was introduced (being a 2/3/3 configuration). Then in April 1982, a medium roof height body variant with a twin moonroof was introduced.

Minor changes to the M20 series LiteAce arrived for November 1982, including a front-end facelift and the adoption of power steering. The van gained the option of a 1626 cc 1Y (YM20) engine with 84 PS (62 kW). Toyota also upgraded the wagon's 13T-U engine to the 1812 cc 2Y (YM21; 95 PS or 70 kW) while proving a new 1839 cc 1C diesel option (63 PS or 46 kW) across the various body variants range (CM20).

When the second generation R20/R30 series TownAce van/wagon arrived in November 1982, the M20 LiteAce truck became the donor model for the next TownAce truck, with minor trim changes distinguishing the two. The subsequent generation of LiteAce van/wagon arrived in September 1985, but M20 manufacture continued until October 1986 when the truck variant came to the market.

Daihatsu Delta 750

Like the previous M10 series, the M20 TownAce again provided the base for the rebadged Daihatsu Delta 750 (D20 series) truck sold between October 1979 and October 1982. The 4K-J engine was fitted and designated KD20.

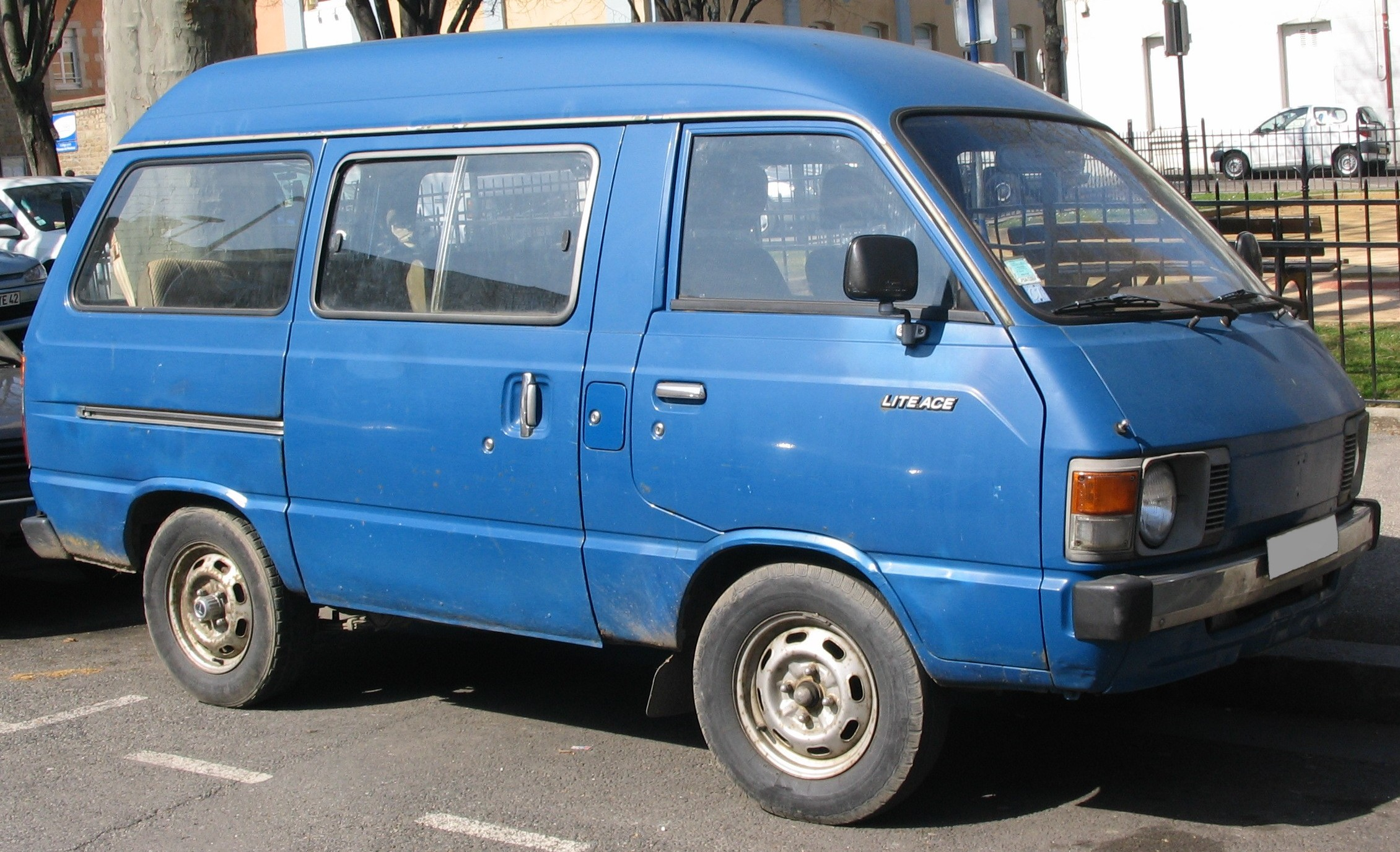
1979–1982 LiteAce van (KM20; pre-facelift)

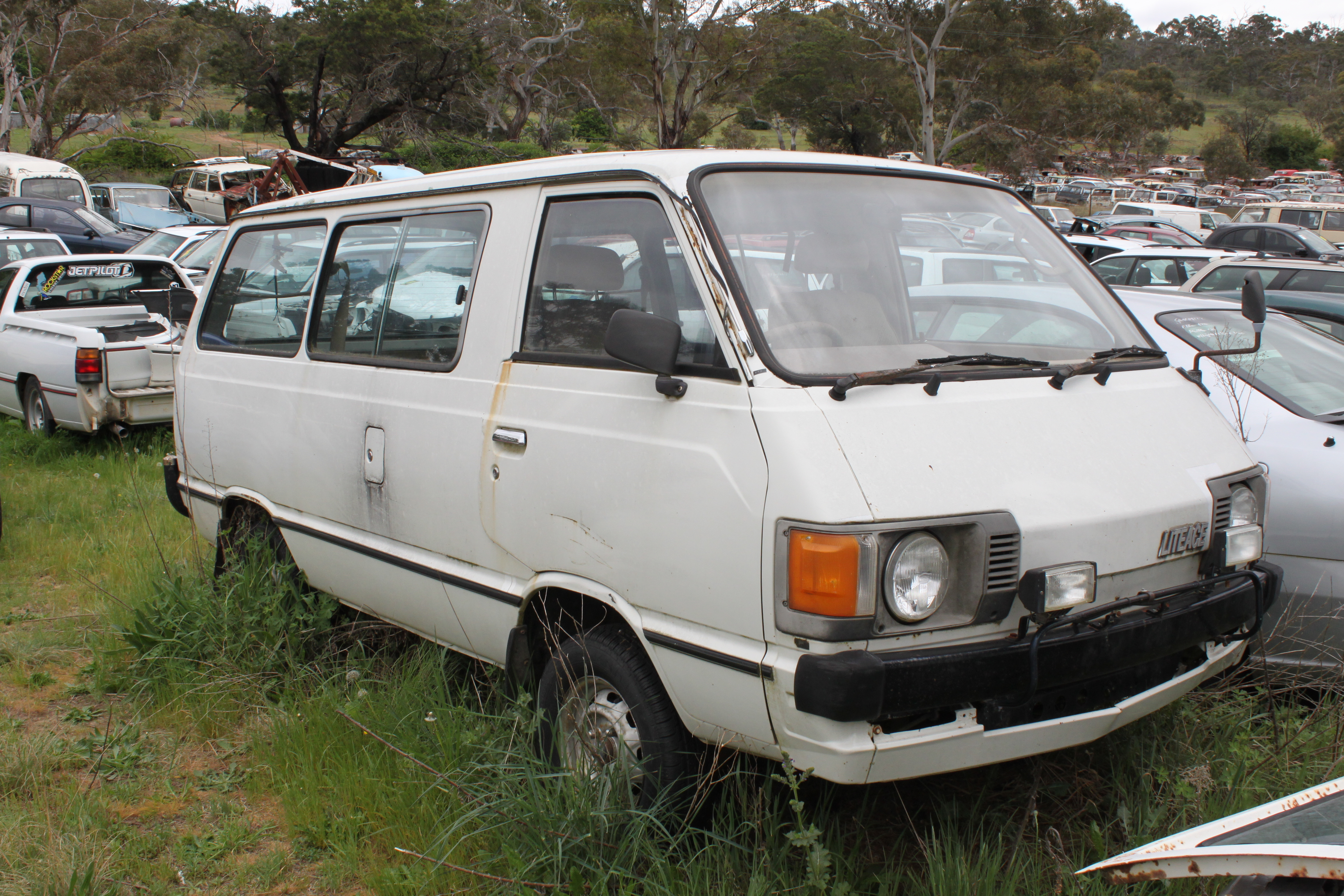
LiteAce van (YM21; facelift)

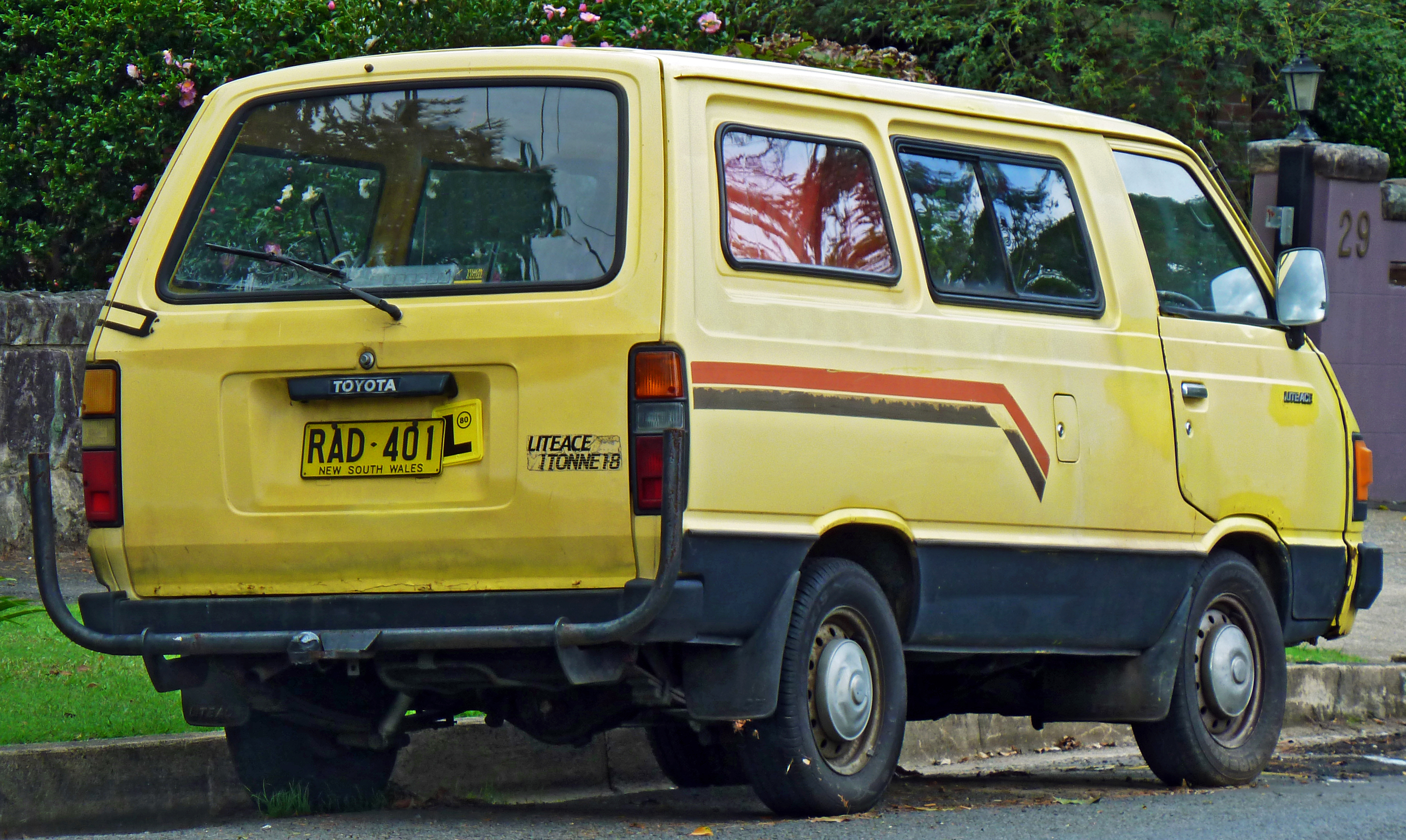
1982–1985 LiteAce van (YM21; facelift)

=== 1985–2007 (M30, M40, M50, M60, M70, M80) LiteAce van/truck, TownAce truck ===
M30, M40, M50, M60, M70, M80
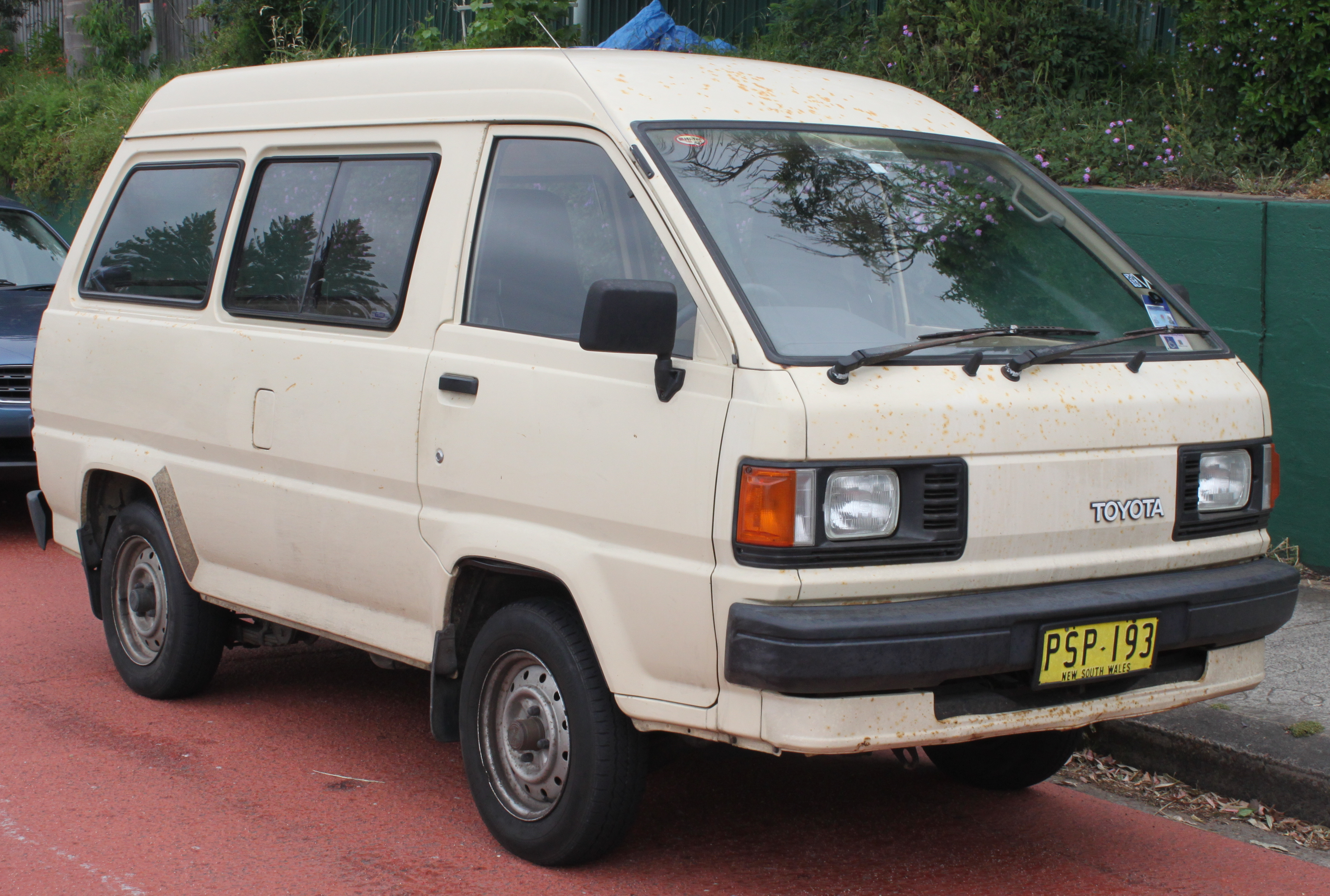
- LiteAce van (YM30)

Overview
- Production: September 1985 – December 1991 (van/wagon); October 1986 – July 2007 (truck)
- Assembly: Japan: Toyota, Aichi (Honsha plant, 1985–2004); Hamura, Tokyo (Hino, 2004–2007); Philippines: Parañaque (TMP, 1989–1999); Malaysia: Shah Alam (ASSB, 1985–1999)

Body and chassis
- Body style: 2-door truck; 4-door van/wagon; 5-door van/wagon
- Layout: Front-engine, rear-wheel-drive; Front-engine, four-wheel-drive
- Related: Toyota Deliboy

Powertrain
- Engine: Gasoline: 1290 cc 4K I4; 1486 cc 5K-U I4; 1812 cc 2Y-U I4; 1781 cc 7K-E I4; 1998 cc 3Y-U I4; Diesel: 1839 cc 1C-II I4; 1974 cc 2C I4; 1974 cc 2C-T turbo I4; 2184 cc 3C-E I4
- Transmission: 4-speed manual; 5-speed manual; 3-speed automatic; 4-speed automatic

Dimensions
- Wheelbase: 2,085 mm (82.1 in) (truck); 2,100 mm (82.7 in) (van/wagon)
- Length: 4,180 mm (164.6 in) (truck); 4,240–4,380 mm (166.9–172.4 in) (truck; 1999); 3,995 mm (157.3 in) (van/wagon)
- Width: 1,650 mm (65.0 in); 1,665–1,690 mm (65.6–66.5 in) (truck; 1999)
- Height: 1,795–1,805 mm (70.7–71.1 in) (truck); 1,789–1,820 mm (70.4–71.7 in) (truck; 1999); 1,755–1,965 mm (69.1–77.4 in) (van/wagon)
- Curb weight: 1,020–1,110 kg (2,250–2,450 lb) (truck); 1,050–1,280 kg (2,314.9–2,821.9 lb) (van/wagon)

The third generation LiteAce van/wagon (M30/M40 series) were placed on the market in September 1985 with four roof variations—a standard roof, a high roof, a high roof with panoramic moonroof (Skylite roof), and a high roof for the SW grade. Dimensionally, body width increased at the expense of length. Improvements to stability and ride comfort were courtesy of an overhauled rear suspension type from a semi-elliptical leaf spring design to a four-link type with a Panhard rod. Further improvements were made by switching to rack and pinion steering.

The interior was designed so that the driver's seating position was virtually the same as in a sedan. Seating options included standard first rows on the cargo van, plus second-row positions on the wagon (five- or six-seater) and optional third-row seats that could be stowed sideways to for additional luggage space. Select trims levels heralded a fully reclining driver's seat and with some, the second-row seats could be turned three-ways (forward, sideways, and backward).

The engine is reached through a small hatch beneath the front seat; this does not open very wide and the limited access came in for some complaint. Engines fitted to the van/wagon included the 1486 cc 5K-U (70 PS or 51 kW) and 1812 cc 2Y-U (79 PS or 58 kW) gasoline engines and two 1974 cc diesels—the 2C (70 PS or 51 kW) and the turbocharged 2C-T (82 PS or 60 kW). In October 1985, a part-time four-wheel drive model was added to the model lineup.

Truck variants of the third generation LiteAce and TownAce launched in October 1986, designated M50/M60/M70/M80. These came installed with the 1998 cc 3Y-U gasoline engine or the 2C diesel. TownAce trucks were sold in two levels of trim, the unbadged DX and the more expensive Super X.

In a minor model change in August 1988, the front and rear of the van/wagon were redesigned, increasing the body length by 75 mm (3.0 in). This facelift was for Japan only. At the same time, Toyota Electronic Modulated Suspension (TEMS) was employed for the first time in a one-box wagon, and the output of the turbocharged diesel engine was boosted to 85 PS (63 kW). In September 1989, the new Super SW specification was added, and a five-door version with dual sliding doors could be specified in conjunction with the SW grade. The manual transmission increased from four- to five-gears in August 1990 along with the fitment of a center high mount stop lamp. Then in October 1991, the four-wheel drive system became available with the truck body.

Although the van/wagon lines were fully redesigned in January 1992 with the rebodied R20 series, the truck line was not renewed until the S400 series in 2008, leaving the M50/M60/M70/M80 model in production until July 2007. Toyota issued a minor front-end facelift in November 1996 with a redesign of the single-piece plastic panel surrounding both headlamps—this now included the attachment of the modern-day Toyota logo. More substantially updated LiteAce and TownAce trucks were released in June 1999, with the front section of the body and dashboard thoroughly redesigned—however, the design of the doors and all parts rearward carried over verbatim. The optional four-wheel drive switched from part-time to full-time configuration, anti-lock brakes were made standard, and airbags an option. The gasoline engine was upgraded to the 1781 cc 7K-E, and the 2C diesel engine made way for the 2184 cc 3C-E which remained in the market until discontinued in August 2004. From December 2004, production switched from the Honsha plant at Toyota, Aichi to the Hamura, Tokyo plant operated by the Toyota-owned Hino Motors.

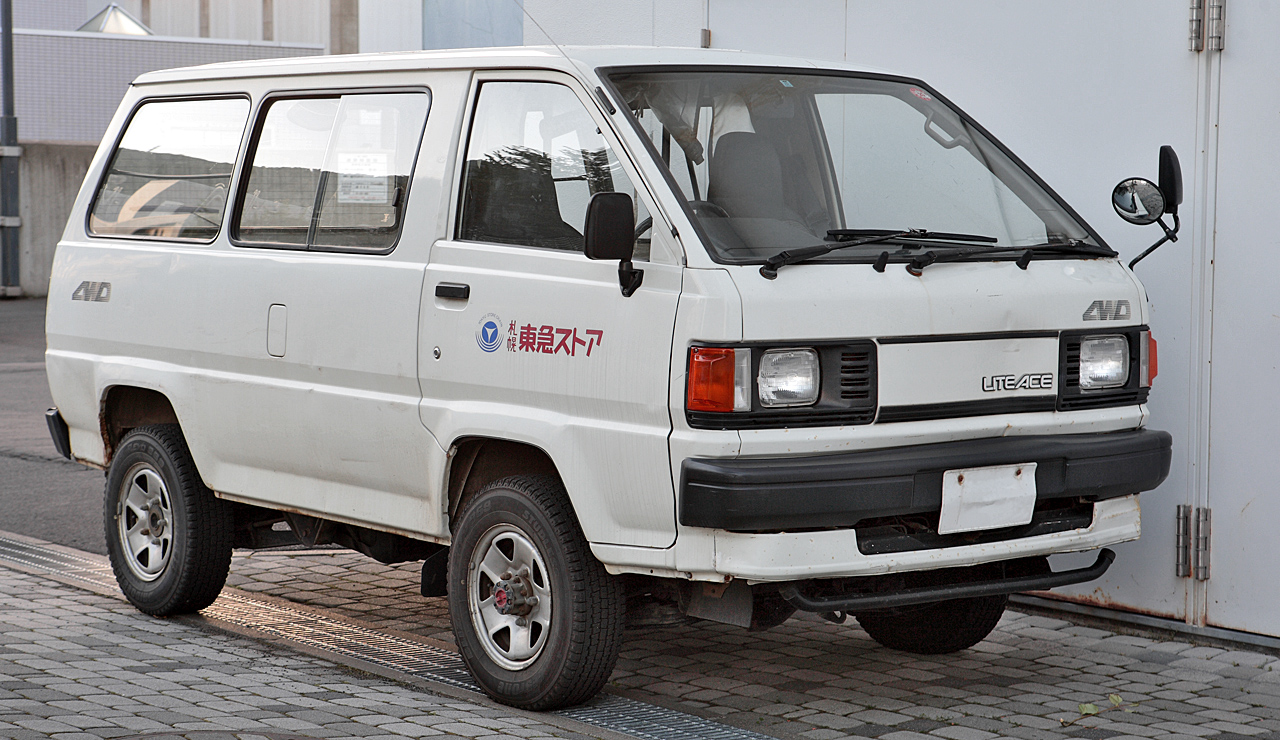
1985–1988 LiteAce van DX 4WD (YM41RV)

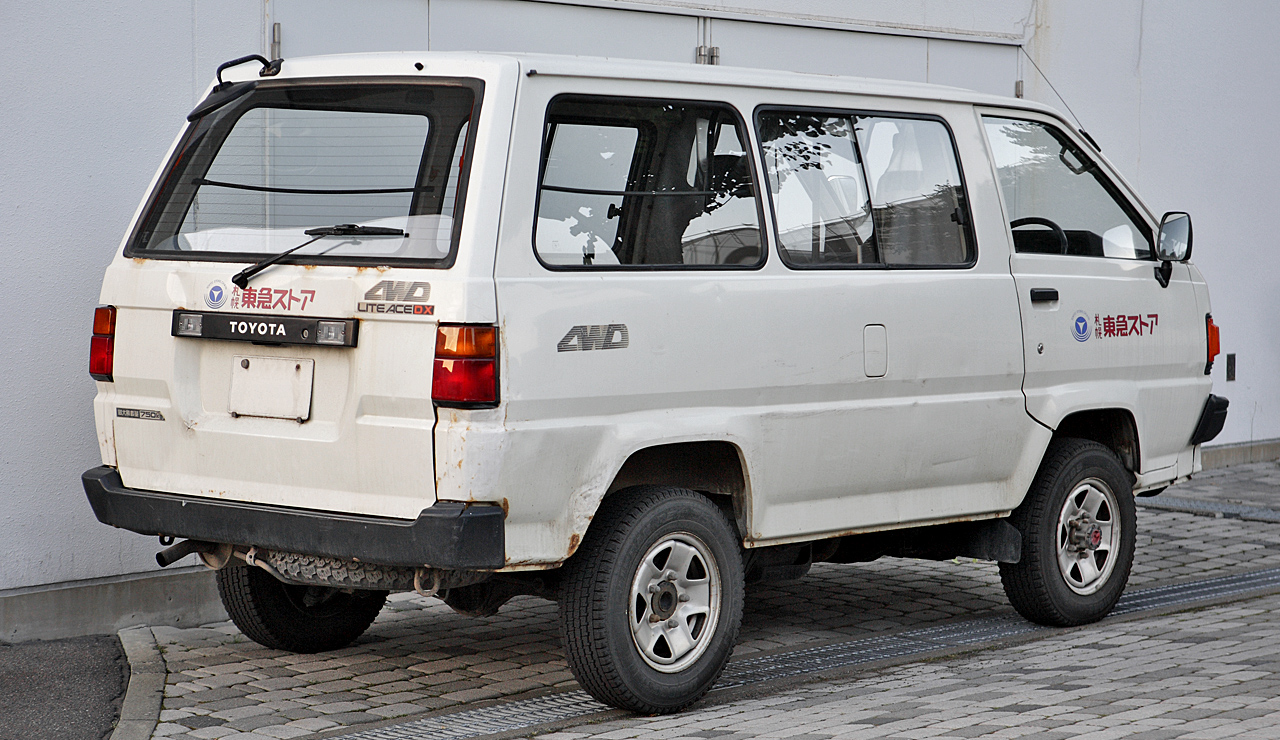
1985–1988 LiteAce van DX 4WD (YM41RV)

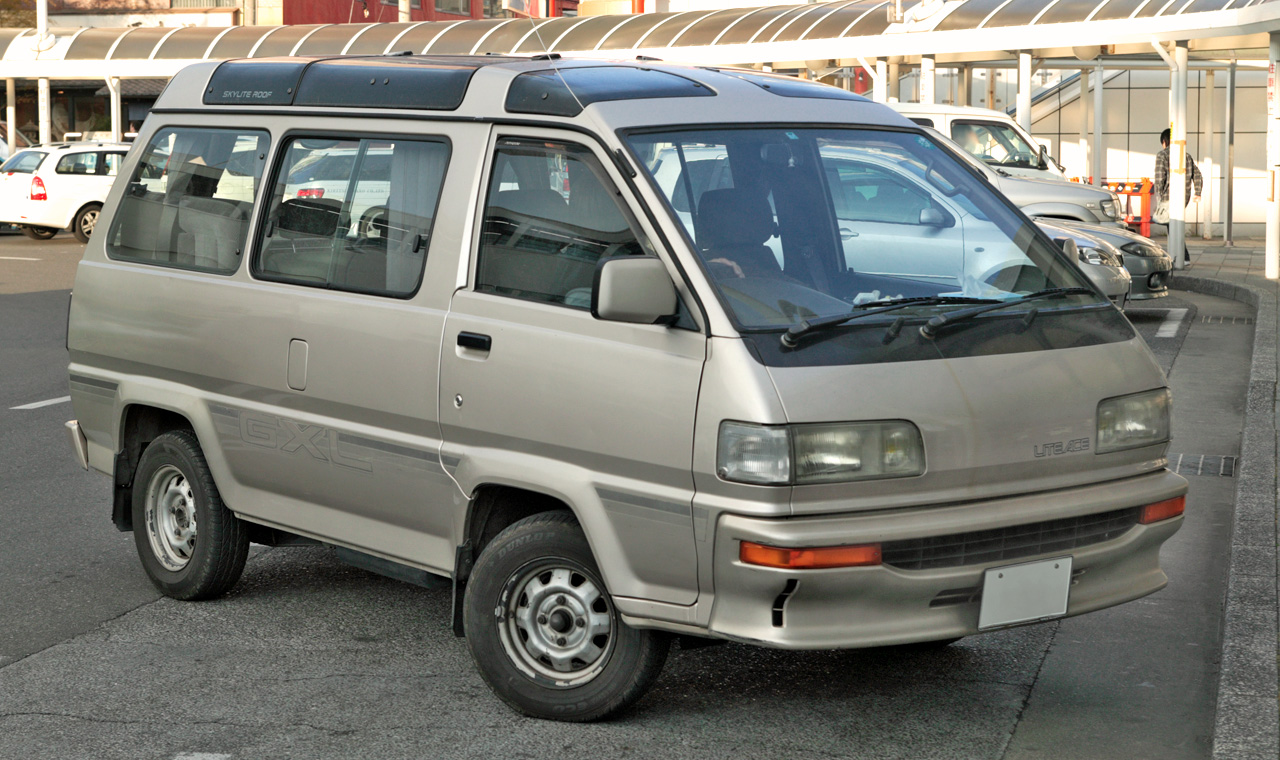
1988–1991 LiteAce wagon GXL (CM30G)

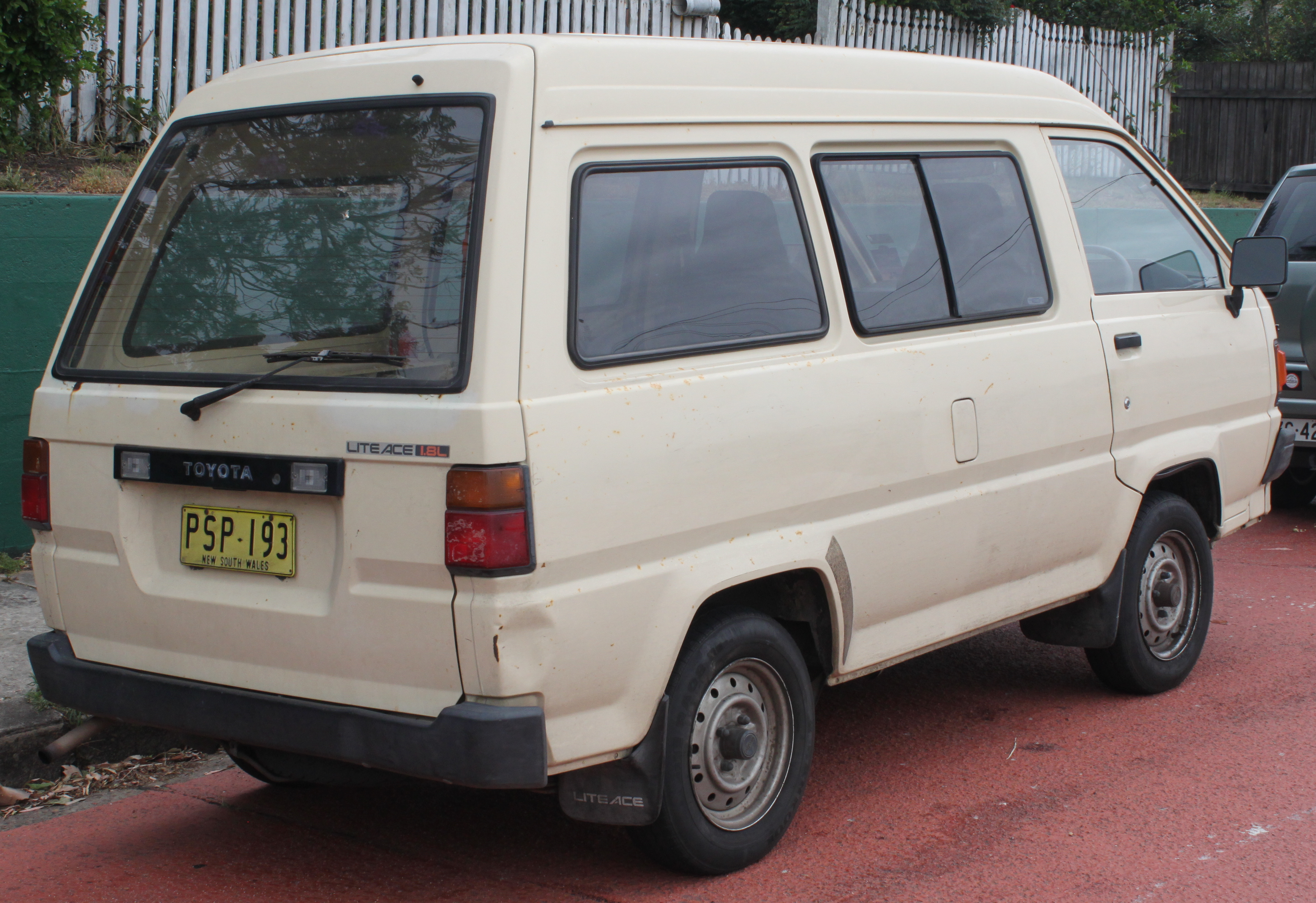
1989 LiteAce van

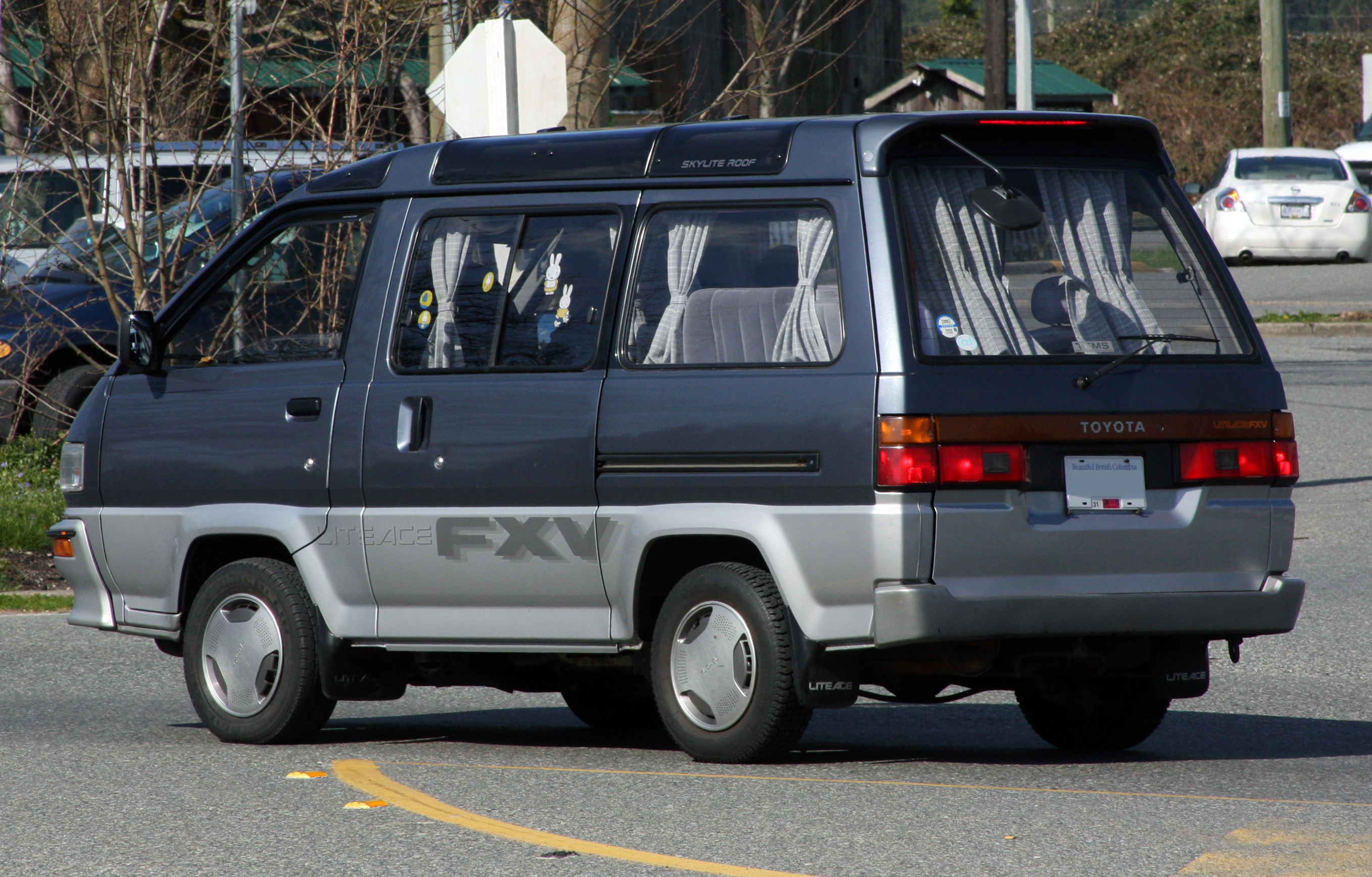
1988–1991 LiteAce wagon FXV

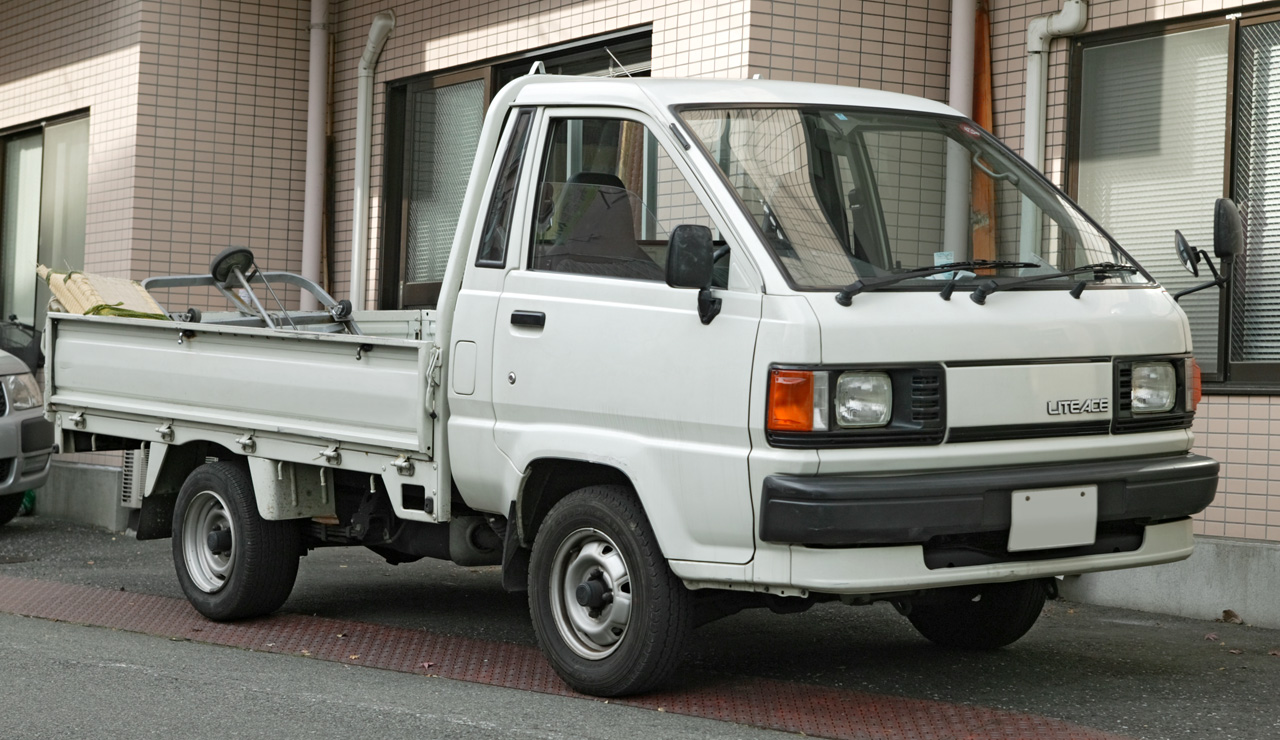
1986–1996 LiteAce truck "just low"

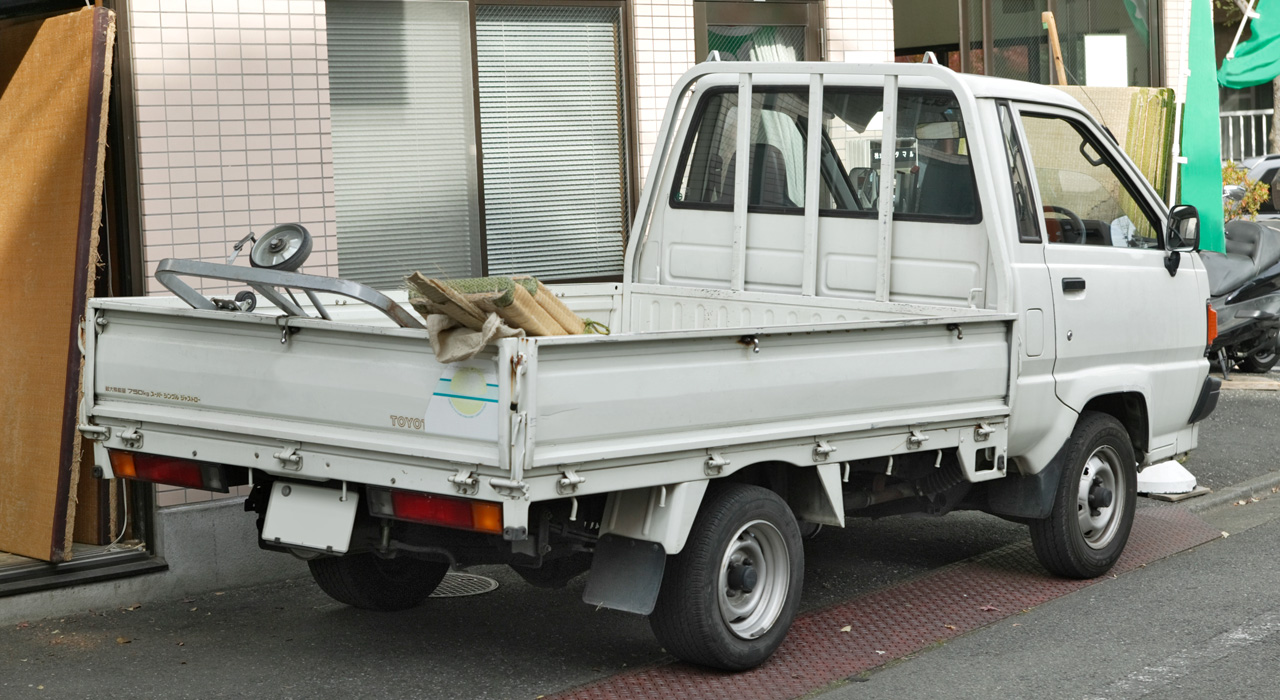
1986–1996 LiteAce truck "just low"

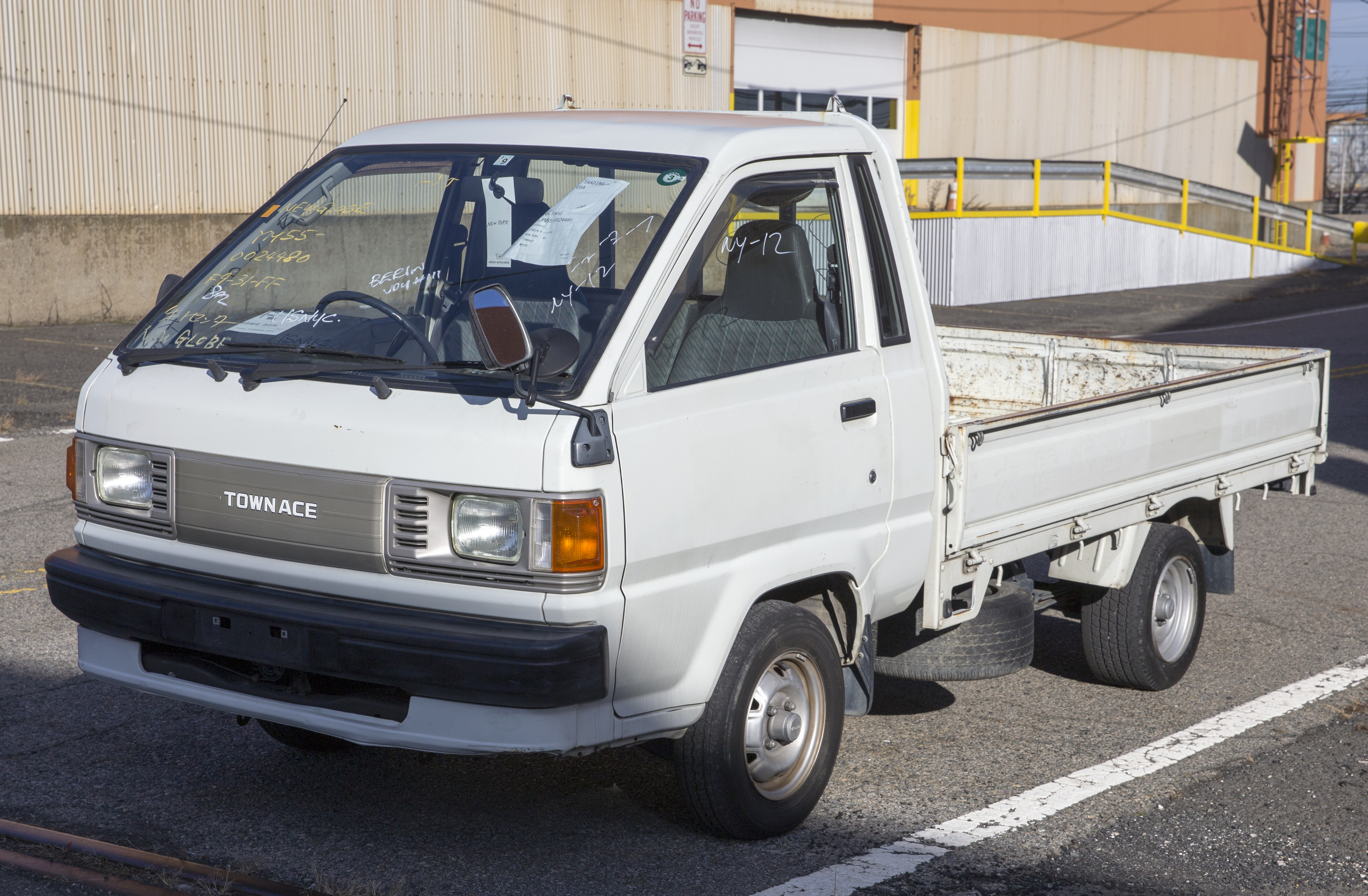
1986–1996 TownAce truck DX

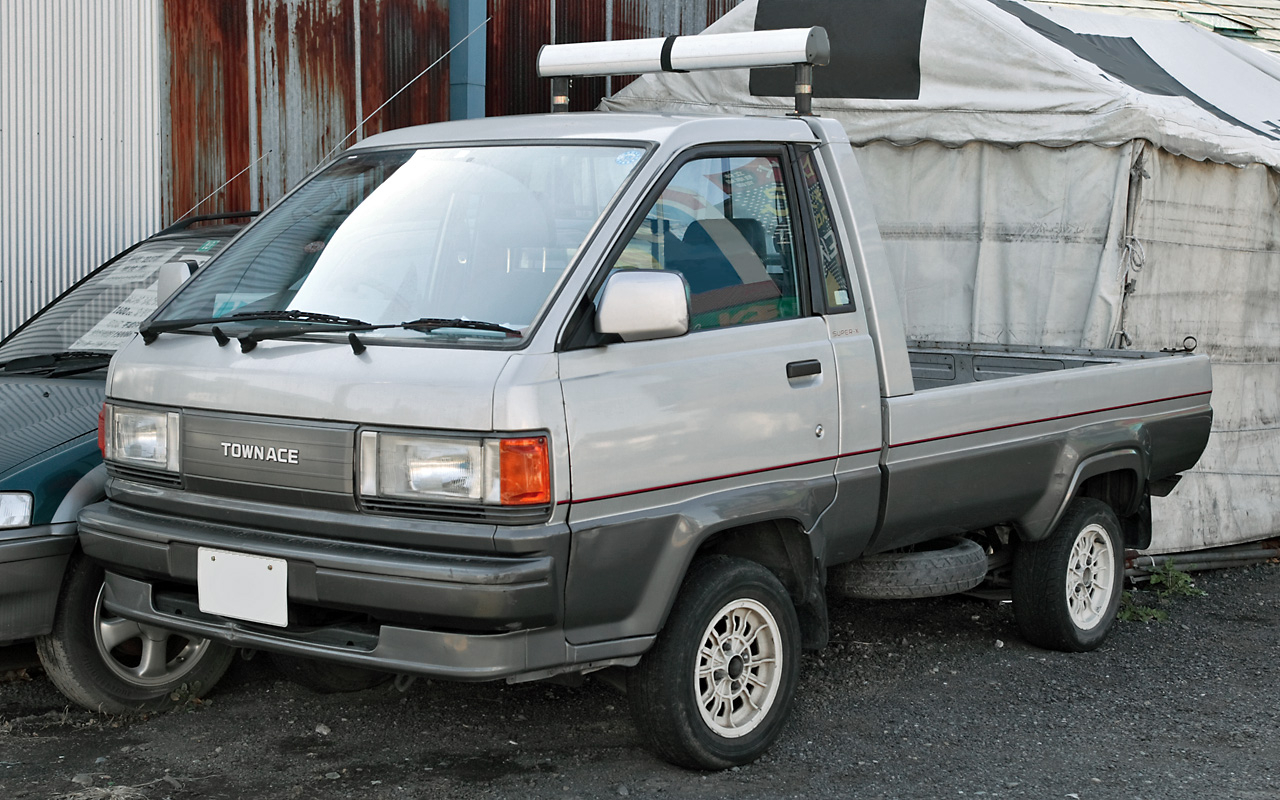
1986–1996 TownAce truck Super X

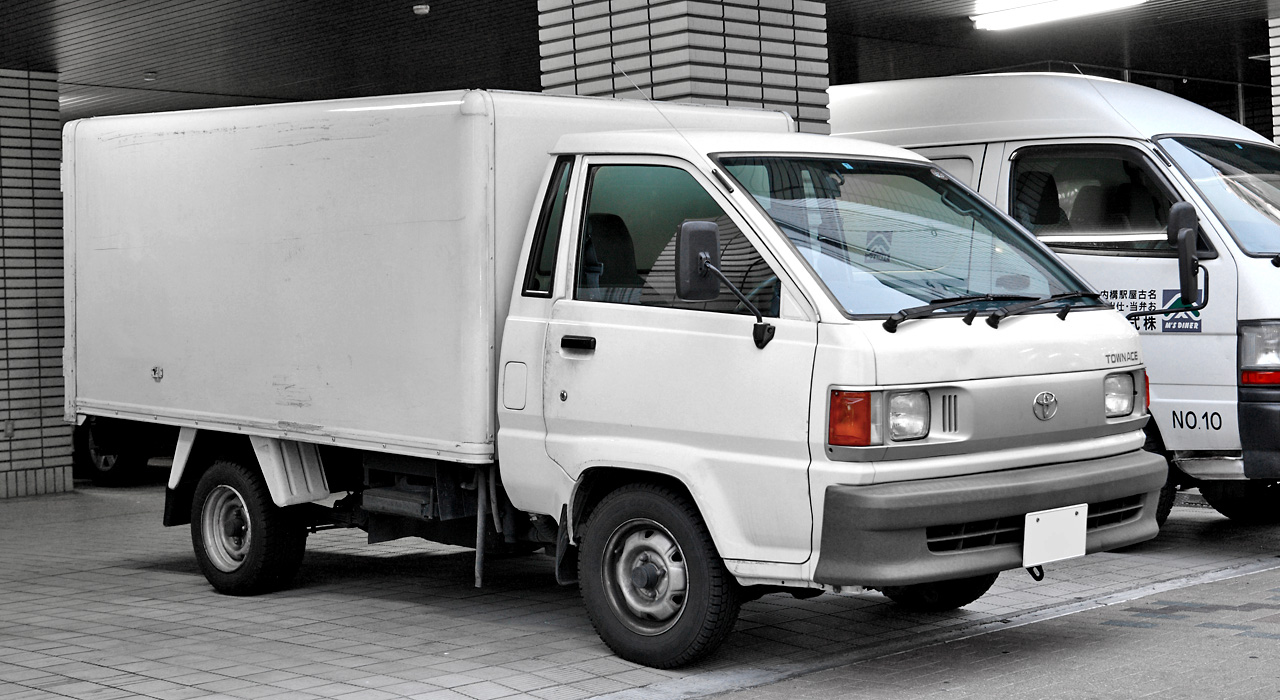
1996–1999 TownAce truck DX

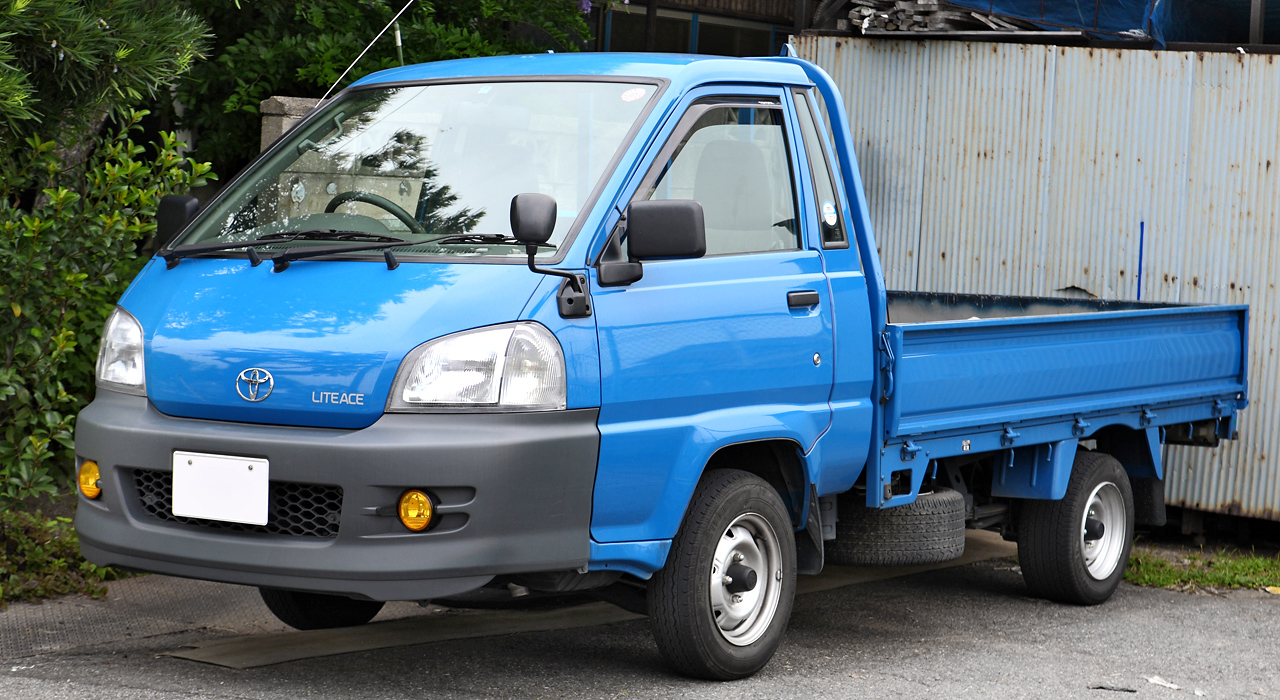
1999–2007 LiteAce truck

==== Toyota Deliboy ====
Toyota Deliboy
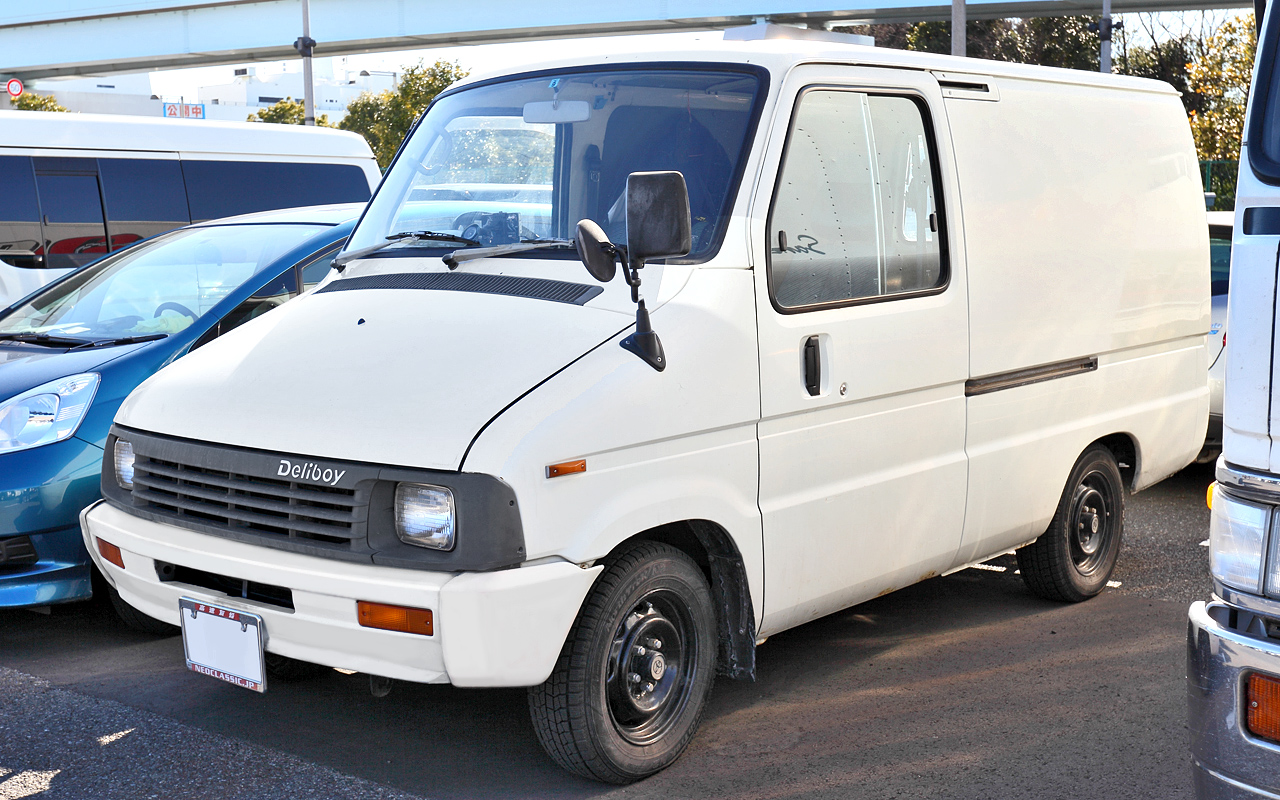

Overview
- Model code: XC10
- Production: 1989–1995

Body and chassis
- Body style: 3-door van

Powertrain
- Engine: 1486 cc 5K I4

Dimensions
- Wheelbase: 2,500 mm (98.4 in)
- Length: 4,385 mm (172.6 in)
- Width: 1,650 mm (65.0 in)
- Height: 1,985 mm (78.1 in)
- Curb weight: 1,200–1,250 kg (2,646–2,756 lb)

Toyota manufactured a rebodied version of the M30 LiteAce truck called the Toyota Deliboy (トヨタデリボーイ, Toyota Deriboi) as a 3-door semi-bonneted walk-through van manufactured from 1989 until 1995. It shared parts with the M30 LiteAce Truck.

The Deliboy was sold through Toyota Auto dealerships. It was a shorter version of the taller QuickDelivery walk-through van and featured a hinged door on the right side, a sliding door on the left side, and double rear doors.

Four trim levels were available: 201 and 205, both models only available in 2-seats, while the 501 and 502 available in 5-seat. Initially, it was only available with a 5-speed manual transmission, but in 1991, the 2.0-litre diesel engine, 3-speed automatic transmission, and 4-speed automatic transmission were added. All grades were powered by the same, 1486 cc 5K petrol engine.

Although the Deliboy was initially used for small-scale deliveries as intended, the Deliboy did not sell well due to its overly simple interior and equipment, as well as the desire for a larger cargo space for delivery purposes. Production ended in 1995.

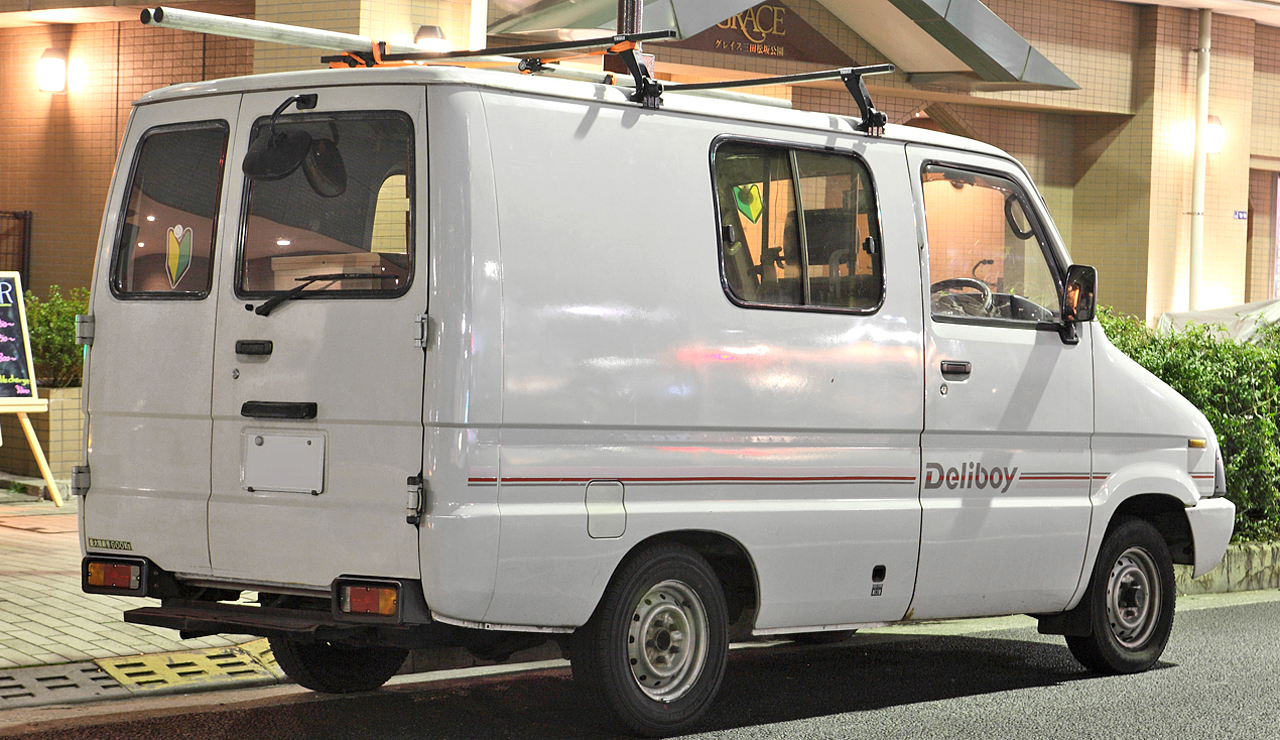
Rear view

== R-series ==
=== 1976–1982 (R10) TownAce van/truck ===
R10
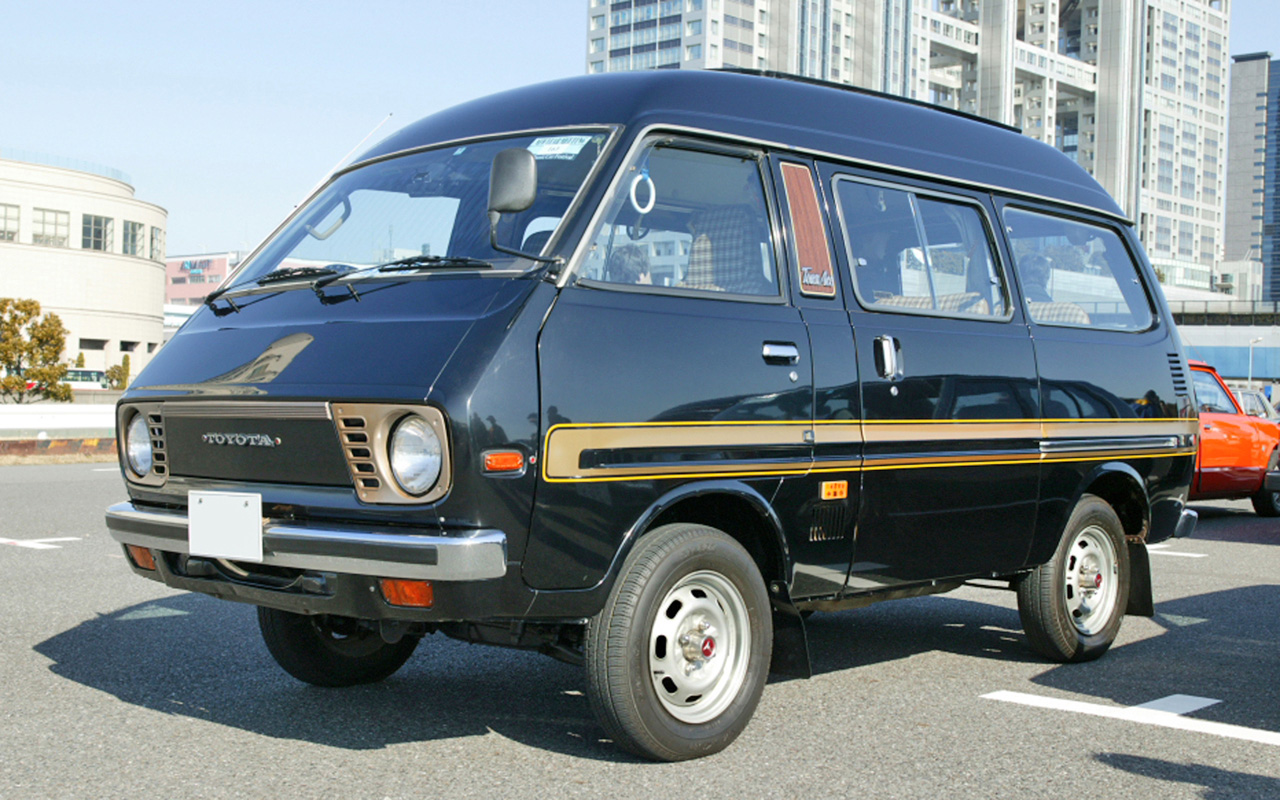
- 1978 TownAce wagon Custom Extra (TR15; pre-facelift)

Overview
- Also called: Daihatsu Delta Wide (B10)
- Production: October 1976 – October 1982 (van/wagon); September 1978 – October 1982 (truck)
- Assembly: Japan: Toyota, Aichi (Honsha plant)

Body and chassis
- Body style: 2-door truck; 4-door van/wagon
- Layout: Front-engine, rear-wheel-drive
- Related: Toyota LiteAce (M10)

Powertrain
- Engine: Gasoline: 1166 cc 3K-J I4; 1290 cc 4K-J I4; 1587 cc 12R-J I4; 1588 cc 2T-J I4; 1588 cc 12T I4; 1770 cc 13T-U I4
- Transmission: 4-speed manual; 5-speed manual; 3-speed automatic

Dimensions
- Wheelbase: 2,170–2,295 mm (85.4–90.4 in) (truck); 2,195 mm (86.4 in) (van/wagon)
- Length: 4,110–4,315 mm (161.8–169.9 in) (truck); 3,990 mm (157.1 in) (van/wagon)
- Width: 1,650–1,695 mm (65.0–66.7 in) (truck); 1,650 mm (65.0 in) (van/wagon)
- Height: 1,840–1,860 mm (72.4–73.2 in) (truck); 1,745–1,760 mm (68.7–69.3 in) (van/wagon)
- Curb weight: 1,080–1,135 kg (2,381–2,502 lb) (truck); 965–1,075 kg (2,127–2,370 lb) (van/wagon)

The first TownAce (R10 series) made its sales debut in October 1976 as a widened and lengthened version of the LiteAce (M10), still using the same doors and some other panels. In the Toyota model hierarchy, TownAce occupied the position in between the LiteAce and HiAce. At first three- or six-seater vans were offered, the more popular TR10 receiving the 1588 cc 2T-J engine (93 PS or 68 kW), although the smallest KR10 has the 1166 cc 3K-J (64 PS or 47 kW). Eight-seater wagons have the desmogged 12T engine rather than the 2T-J (TR11G chassis code rather than TR10V), and therefore lower power at 85 PS (63 kW). The second and third rows of seating could be laid fully flat, and the third-row seats could be folded to expand the luggage compartment. The 4K-J motor with 69 PS (51 kW) replaced the 3K-J in February 1978. That October, the wagon engine was uprated to the 92 PS (68 kW) 1770 cc 13T-U (TR15), and high-roof models with heights of 1,975 and 1,990 mm (77.8 and 78.3 in) were introduced. Further changes in October 1978 included suspension revisions, the release of the flagship "Custom Extra" grade with manual sunroof. October 1979 changes adjusted the trim surrounding the headlamps, introduced a revised dashboard, and resulted in the "Custom Extra" being renamed "Super Extra".

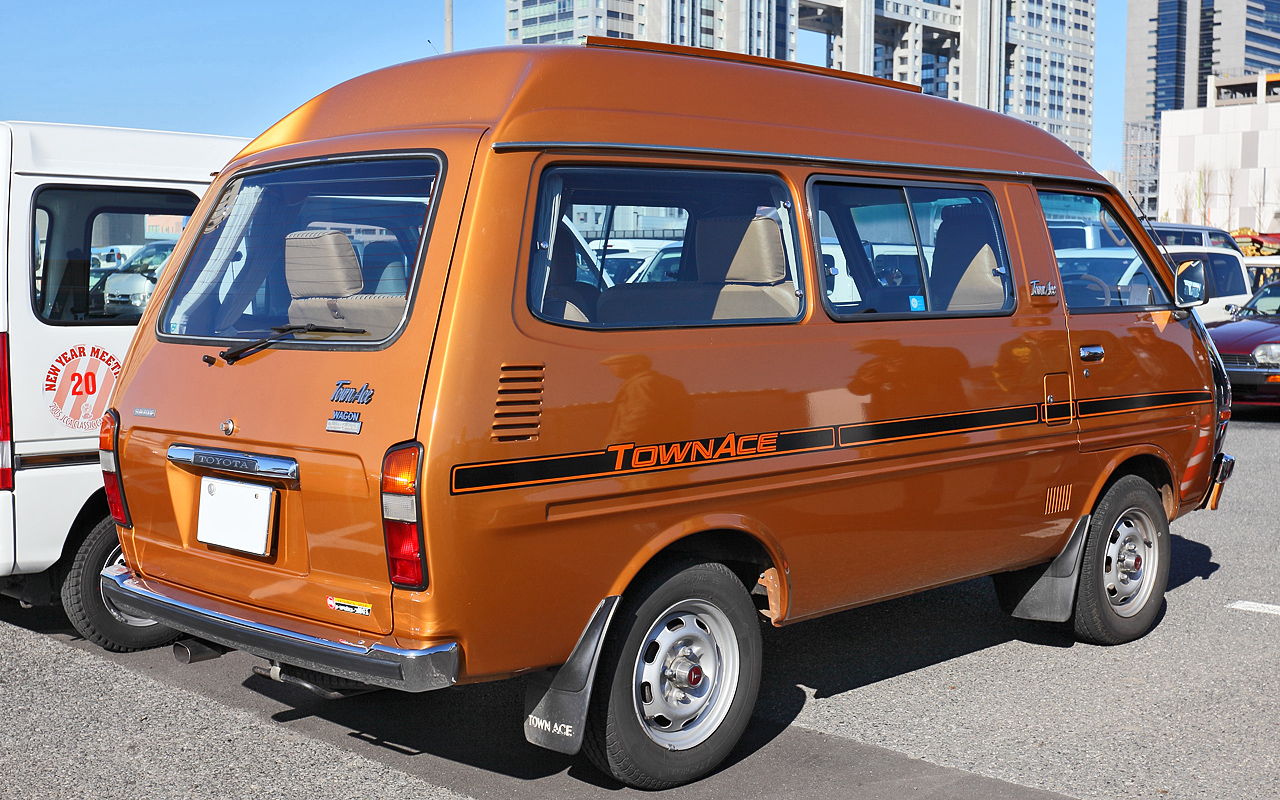
1979–1980 TownAce wagon Super Extra (TR15; first facelift)

Truck body styles were added to the lineup in October 1978 (having entered production the previous month), including low-deck, high-deck, and "just low" models—these further lowered the bed floor by employing radial tires which had smaller diameters despite the identical 13-inch wheel size. Each of the three models offered standard- and long-wheelbase versions, the latter with as much space as the larger HiAce truck (albeit with a lower payload) and carrying the RR20/RR21 chassis codes—confusing, since the R20-series was generally reserved for the second generation TownAce. At first, trucks received the 1587 cc 12R-J engine (80 PS or 59 kW), until October 1979 when emission standards compliance necessitated the fitment of the 1770 cc 13T-U motor shared with the wagon. At the same time, the "just low" model adopted 10-inch double tires for the rear wheels, lowering the bed floor to the same level as that of light trucks.

December 1980 introduced a small facelift with rectangular headlamps, plastic bumpers, and other adjusted trimmings—along with further suspension refinements, an optional cool box, and a new electrically-retractible moonroof (the manual version continued in some grades). In conjunction with this facelift, the scope of the wagon was expanded, reflecting the rising demand for this one-box vehicle type in the market. For example, by adding three-speed automatic and five-speed manual transmission models, sliding second-row seats that could be made to face either forward or backward, and the release of Grand Extra model with its lavish cabin. Furthering this, a campervan package titled "Canyon" came to the market in February 1982, featuring a moonroof, loft beds, powered curtains, and bronze-tinted glass.

When this generation was replaced in November 1982, the TownAce van/wagon and truck range parted—the former based on the new R20/R30 series and the truck becoming a rebadged model of the LiteAce M20.

Daihatsu Delta Wide

The TownAce was also sold as the Daihatsu Delta Wide (B10 series) between October 1976 and October 1982. Originally, this series came as a van/wagon supplied with the 3K-J (KB10) and 2T-J engines (TB10). The 4K-J (KB11) replaced 3K-J in February 1978—updated as the KB12 alongside a revised 2T-J (TB11) in October 1979. A model with the 13T-U unit entered production in September 1978 (TB15).

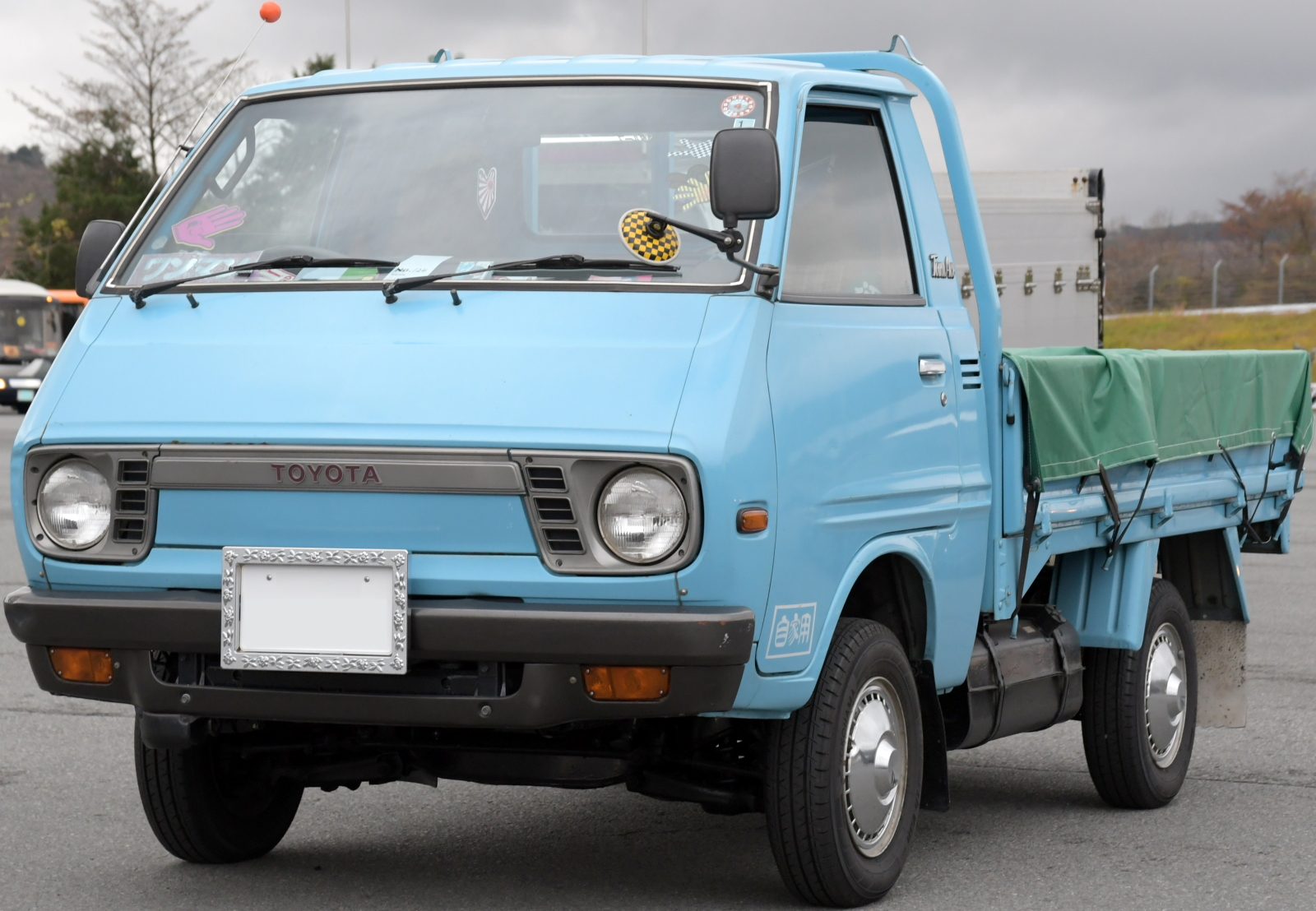
Town Ace truck (RR11; first facelift)

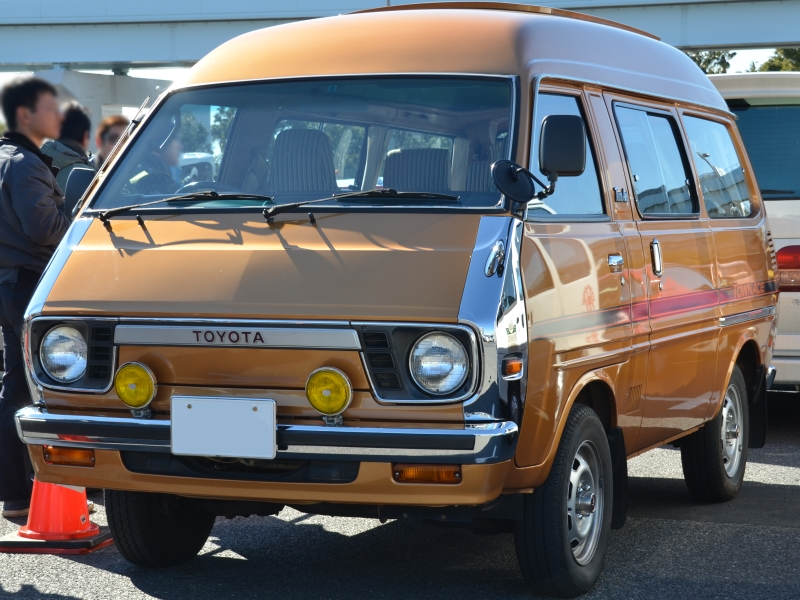
1979–1980 TownAce wagon Super Extra (TR15; first facelift)

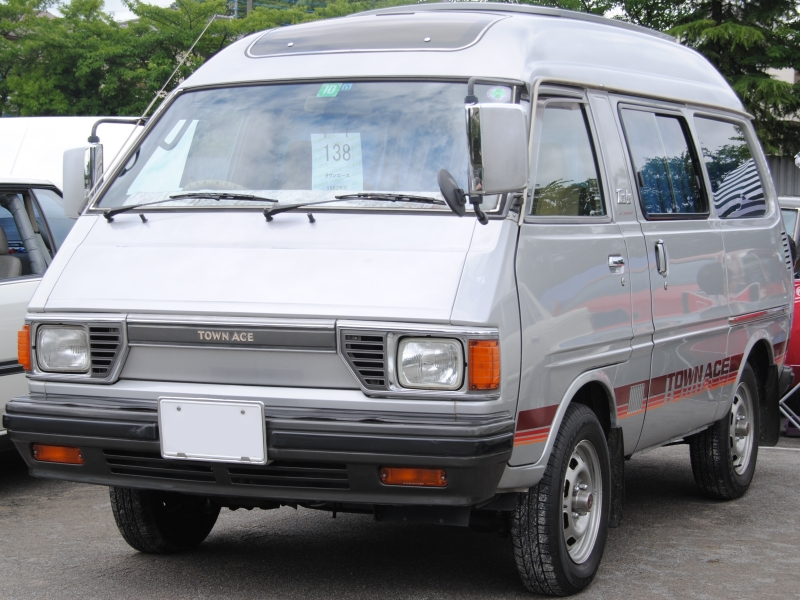
1980–1982 TownAce wagon Grand Extra (TR15; second facelift)

=== 1982–1991 (R20, R30) TownAce van, MasterAce Surf van ===
R20, R30
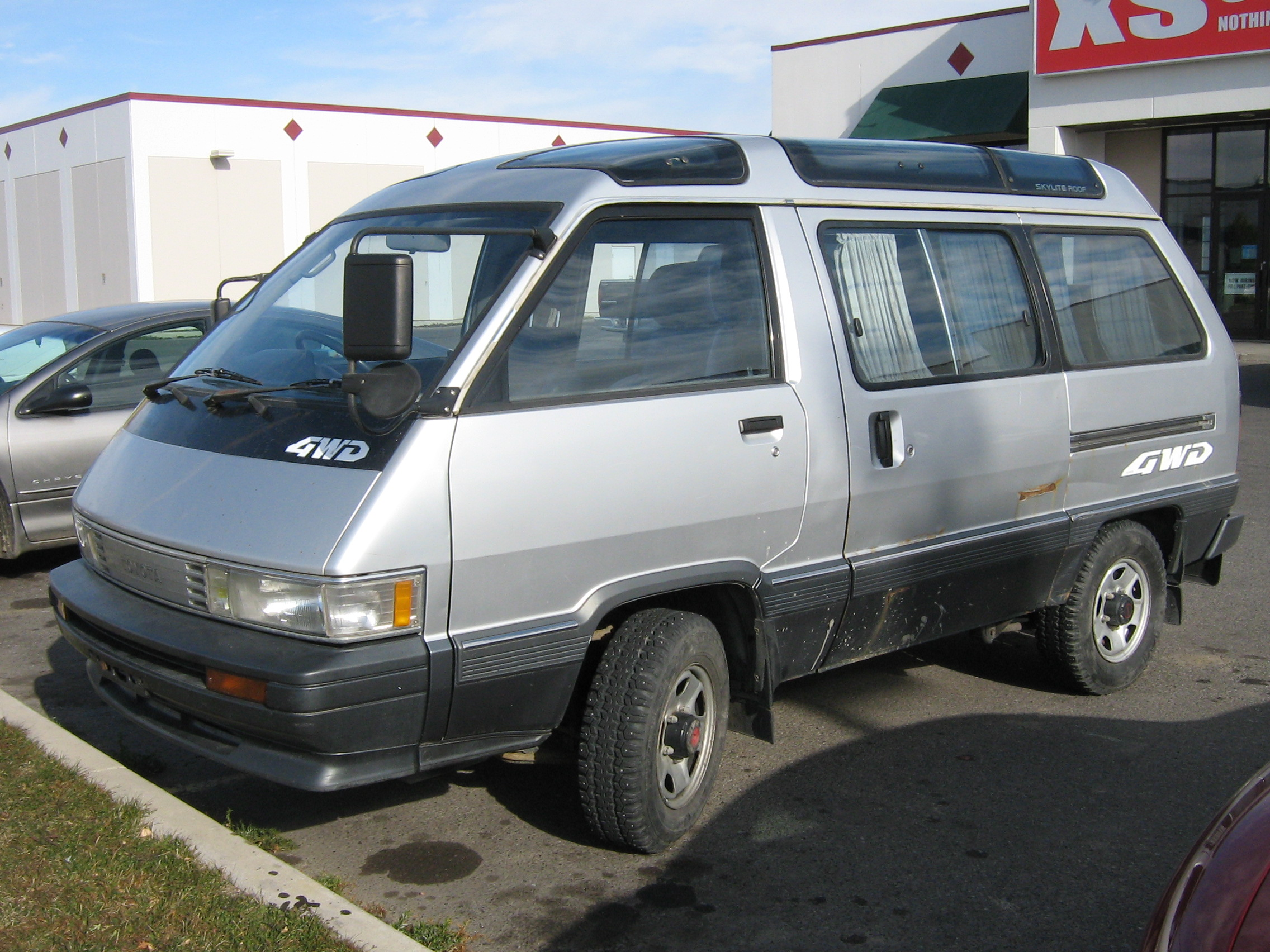
- 1985–1988 TownAce (first facelift)

Overview
- Also called: Toyota MasterAce Surf; Toyota Model F (Europe); Toyota Space Cruiser (UK); Toyota Tarago (Australia); Toyota Van (North America); Daihatsu Delta Wide (B20)
- Production: November 1982 – December 1991
- Assembly: Japan: Kariya, Aichi (Toyota Industries HQ Kariya Plant)

Body and chassis
- Body style: 4-door van/wagon
- Layout: Front-engine, rear-wheel-drive; Front-engine, four-wheel-drive

Powertrain
- Engine: Gasoline: 1.3 L 4K-J I4; 1.6 L 1Y-J I4; 1.8 L 2Y-U/2Y-C I4; 2.0 L 3Y-C/3Y-U/3Y-EU I4; 2.2 L 4Y-E I4; Diesel: 1.8 L 1C I4; 2.0 L 2C I4; 2.0 L 2C-T turbo I4
- Transmission: 5-speed manual; 3-speed automatic; 4-speed A44DL automatic

Dimensions
- Wheelbase: 2,235 mm (88.0 in)
- Length: 4,315–4,455 mm (169.9–175.4 in)
- Width: 1,670–1,685 mm (65.7–66.3 in)
- Height: 1,940–1,955 mm (76.4–77.0 in) (high roof)

Chronology
- Successor: Toyota Previa/Estima (for MasterAce)

The second generation TownAce van/wagon arrived in November 1982. As a response to the growing popularity of one-box vehicles, Toyota released the higher-end MasterAce Surf at the same time sold only at Toyota Store locations—although it was mechanically identical to the lesser TownAce with minimal cosmetic changes. The TownAce used a front mid-engine layout where the driver and front passenger sat directly above the front axle; optional four-wheel drive was introduced in December 1985. Much of the vehicle's mechanicals were based on the Toyota Hilux, including suspension components. The leaf spring rear suspension of the R10 was replaced with a four-link coil rigid suspension with a Panhard rod for the first time among Japanese cab-over-engine type van/wagons. The front suspension was of a double wishbone and torsion bar spring design.

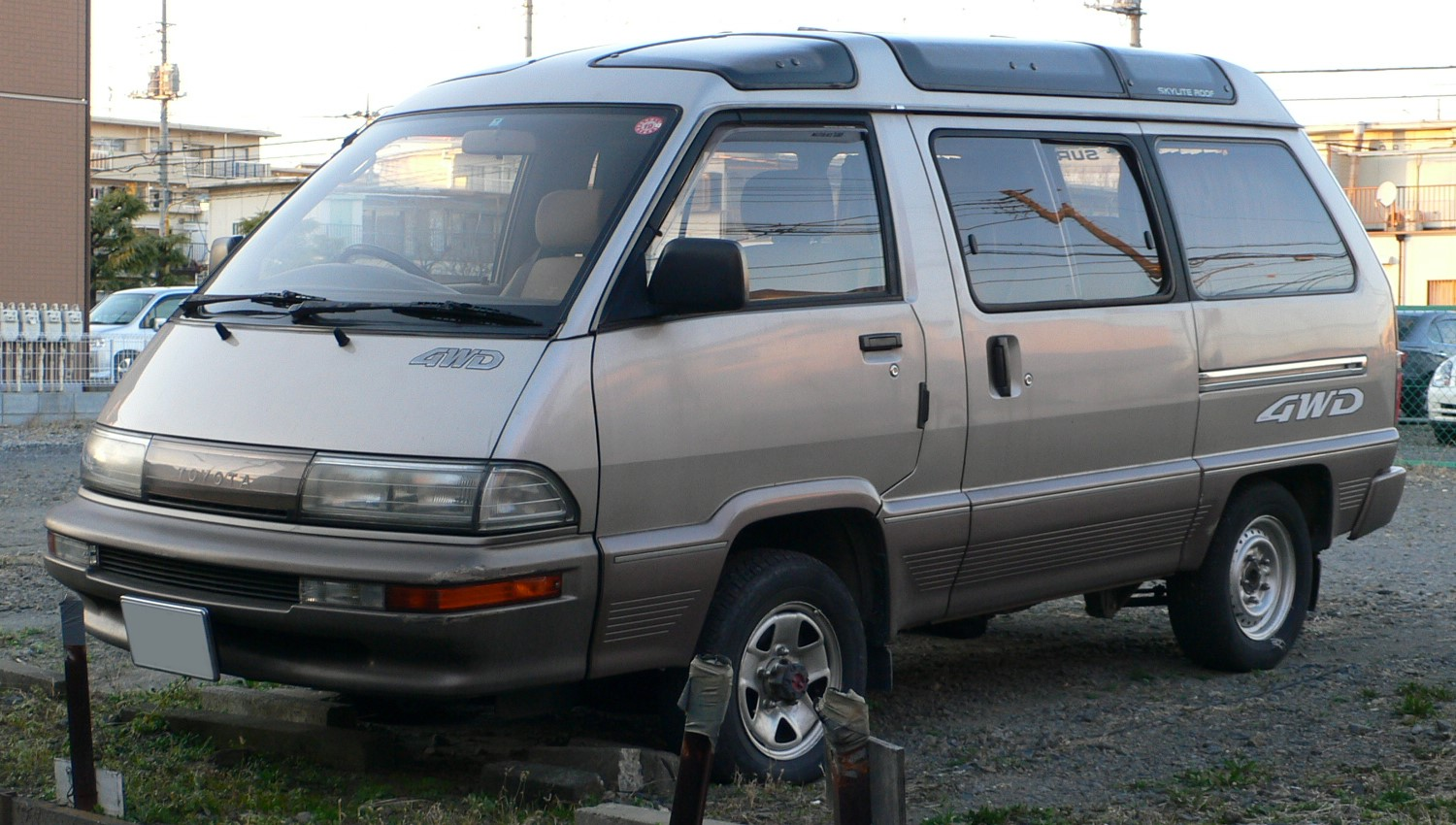
1988–1991 MasterAce Surf 4WD (second facelift)

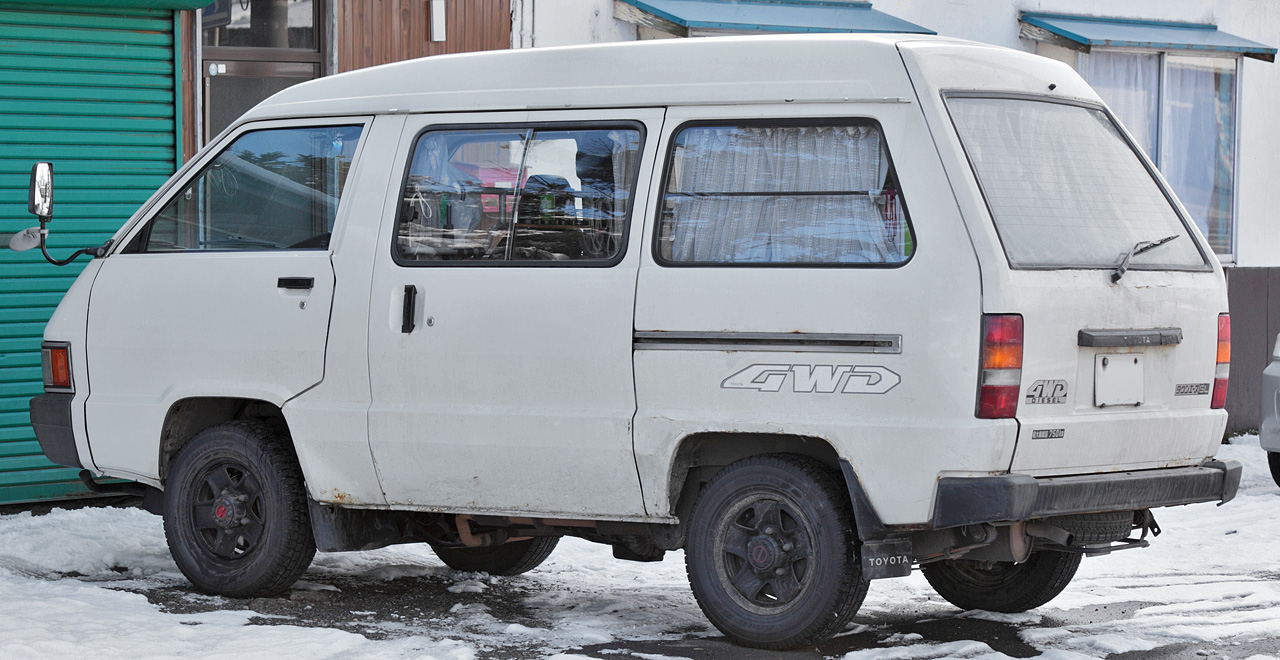
1985 TownAce 4WD GL (CR36V; pre-facelift)

Stylistically, the R20/R30 featured a sharply sloped front, in contrast to the upright flat found in the larger Toyota HiAce. Three roof heights were available (low, medium, high) and for the latter two, a dual moonroof was optional (the front tilted and rear opened fully). As with the TownAce wagon, the MasterAce Surf came equipped with either the medium- or high-roofed body with dual moonroof options for both. Exterior design differences of the MasterAce Surf when compared to the TownAce included larger US-style bumpers and rectangular quad headlamps. In the Japanese market, a wide range of accessories were available, including a refrigerator with ice maker, a seven-speaker audio system, and a color television. The Catalina package for MasterAce Surf included a removable loft bed that became bunk beds with the second- and third-row seats laid flat.

Toyota facelifted the TownAce and MasterAce Surf in August 1985, restyling the headlamps and garnish between them. In addition, the tail-lamps were reshaped and the strip above the license plate was extended to the edges of the back door. A "Skylite" roof model arrived with this update, further increasing model variations. A second, more extensive facelift and full interior update arrived in August 1988 for Japan only which was shared with the MasterAce (although both continued to uphold slight cosmetic differences). This time the option of Toyota Electronic Modulated Suspension (TEMS) was made available.

Initially, the only available engine was the 1812 cc 2Y-U engine outputting 95 PS (70 kW) in a rear-wheel drive configuration. Transmission choices comprised a five-speed manual and a four-speed automatic with overdrive (the first for this type of vehicle). By 1983, additional gasoline engines: the 1290 cc 4K-J inline-four engine with 69 PS (51 kW), the 1626 cc 1Y-J inline-four giving 84 PS (62 kW), and the 1998 cc 3Y-U with 88 PS (65 kW) had been made available. Some markets gained the option of the 1974 cc 2C diesel engine with 72 PS (53 kW) in May 1983. In May 1983, the 1998 cc 3Y-EU engine with electronic fuel injection (EFI) rated at 97 PS (71 kW) was made available. The following year in May, a high performance specification same engine was released with 115 PS (85 kW) was made available. A new turbocharged 2C-T diesel model displacing 1974 cc and proving 82 PS (60 kW) or 88 PS (65 kW) was introduced in August 1984, followed by part-time four-wheel drive models with a sub transmission in November 1985 (with the 1998 cc 3Y-EU gasoline or 82 PS 2C-T turbo diesel engine). For exports, the 2237 cc 4Y-E engine arrived with the August 1985 facelift and provided 75 kW (101 hp) and 180 N⋅m (130 lb⋅ft).

Toyota released the Estima in May 1990—a larger vehicle than the TownAce and MasterAce Surf. While the R20/R30 models were typically discontinued in export markets in 1990 with the release of this new model (usually badged Previa overseas), for Japan, production continued until January 1992. The reason being that unlike the R20/R30, the Estima did not fall under the "number five" tax bracket regarding Japanese vehicle size tax legislation. To comply, dimensions had to remain under 1,700 mm (66.9 in) for width and 4,700 mm (185.0 in) in length, plus 2000 cc for engine displacement. It was not until January 1992 that Toyota released smaller, complying versions of the Estima in Japan under the names Estima Emina and Estima Lucida. These cars replaced the high-end MasterAce Surf, with a rebodied version of the R20/R30 TownAce continuing on until 1996.

Daihatsu Delta Wide

As with the previous generation, the TownAce was sold by Daihatsu as the B20 series Daihatsu Delta Wide van/wagon between November 1982 and January 1992. At launch, the van models were retailed in 1300 and 1600 forms—in-line with their engine displacements. The 1300 model had three-seater bench with 600 kg (1,300 lb) cargo payload. The 1600 increased this to 750 kg (1,650 lb), unless a second row of three seats was fitted which reduced this to 500 kg (1,100 lb). Passenger wagon models offered four levels of specification, the entry-level SD, followed by the SG, SE, and flagship SQ. Both gasoline and diesel engines could be specified, with automatic transmission available with the gasoline version. Updates including facelifts were as per the TownAce.

Export

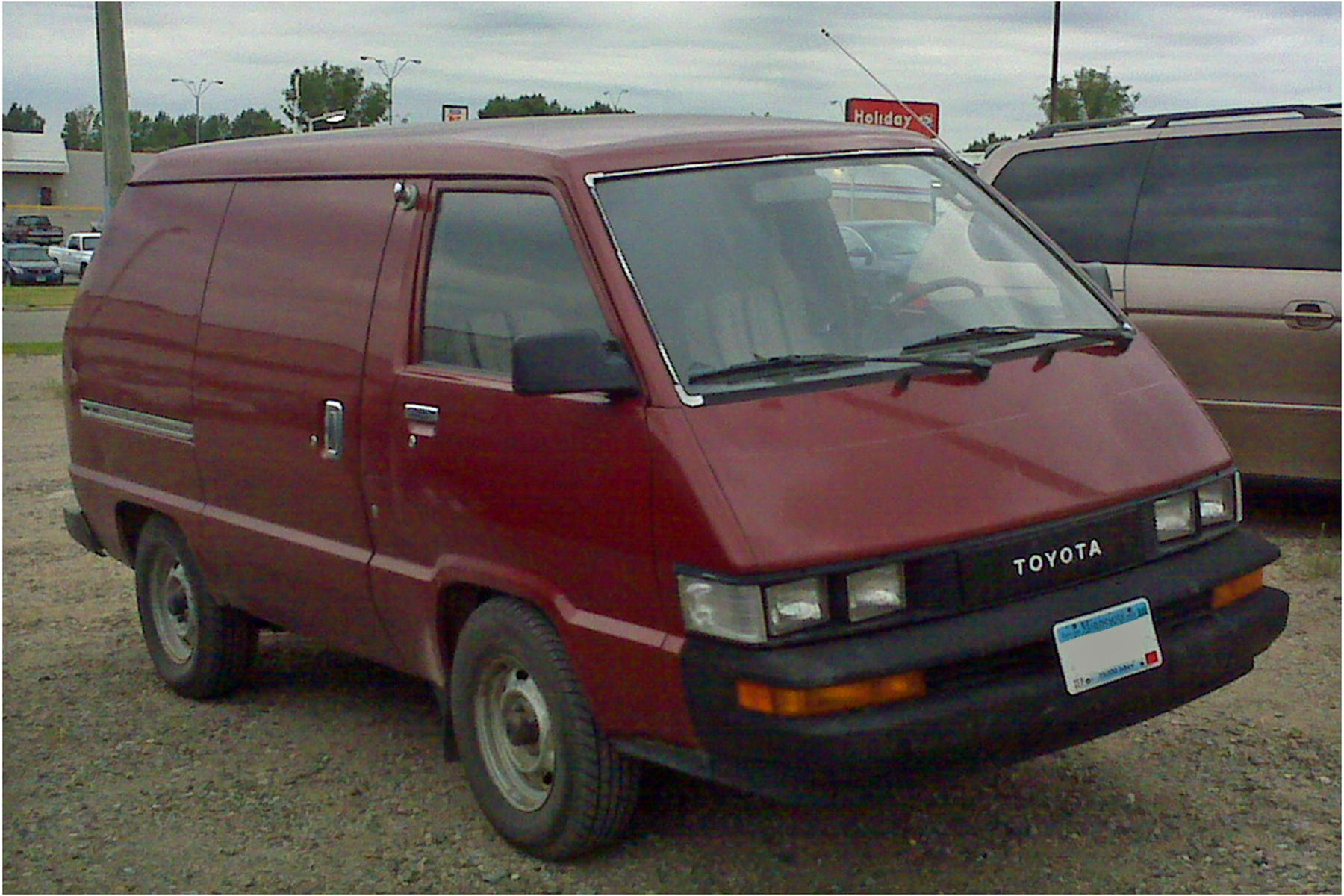
Toyota Van CRG (US; facelift)

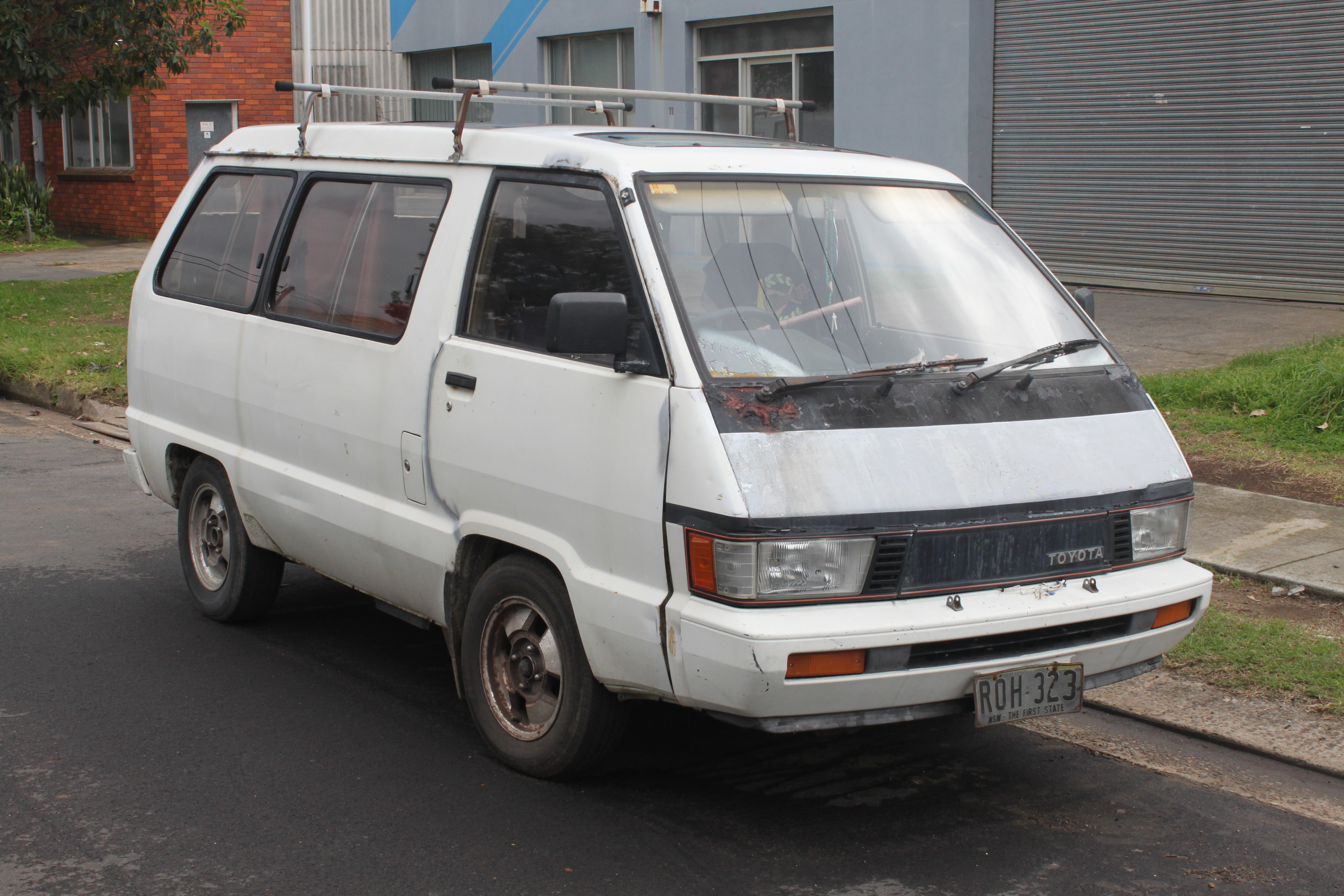
Toyota Tarago GL (YR21; pre-facelift)

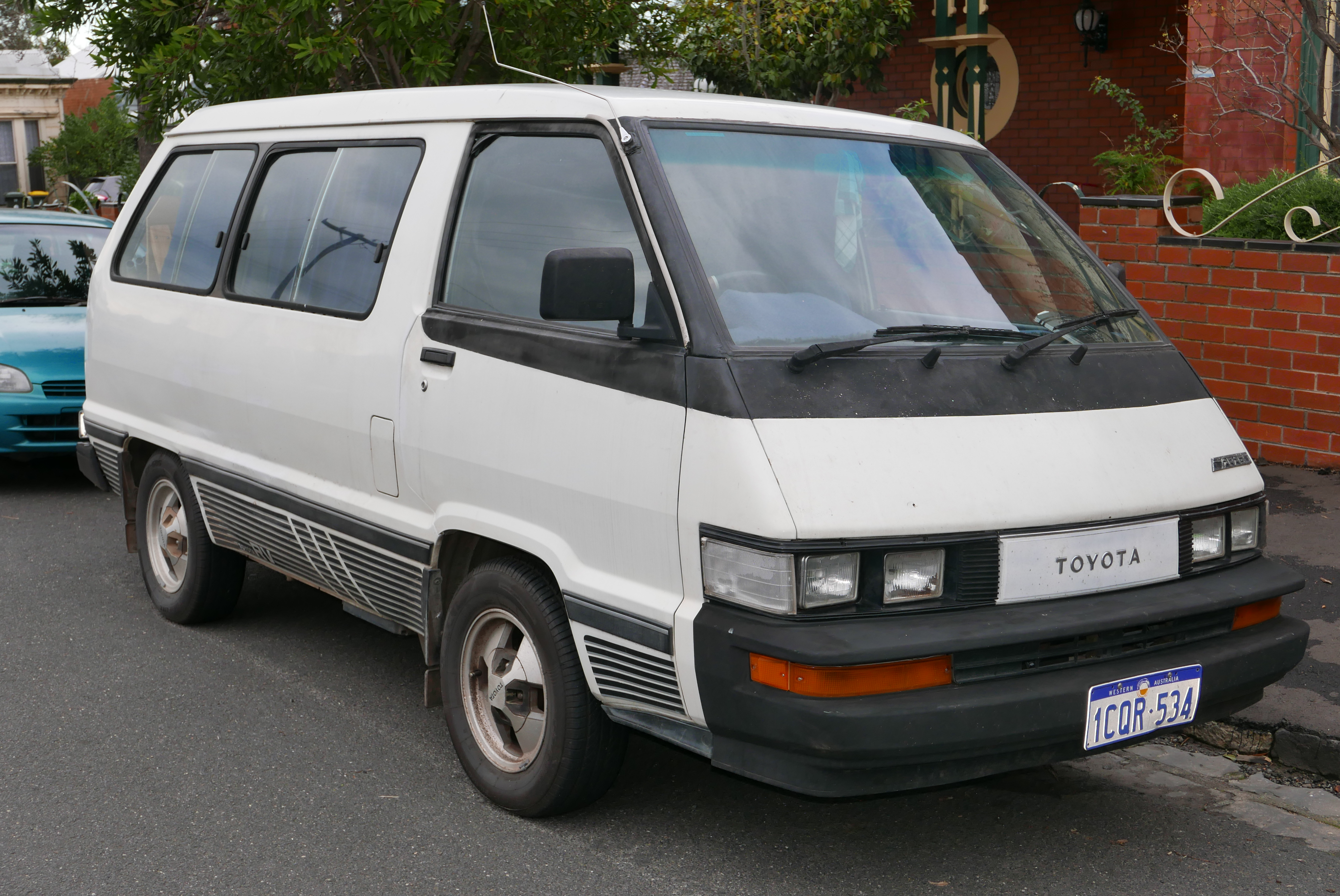

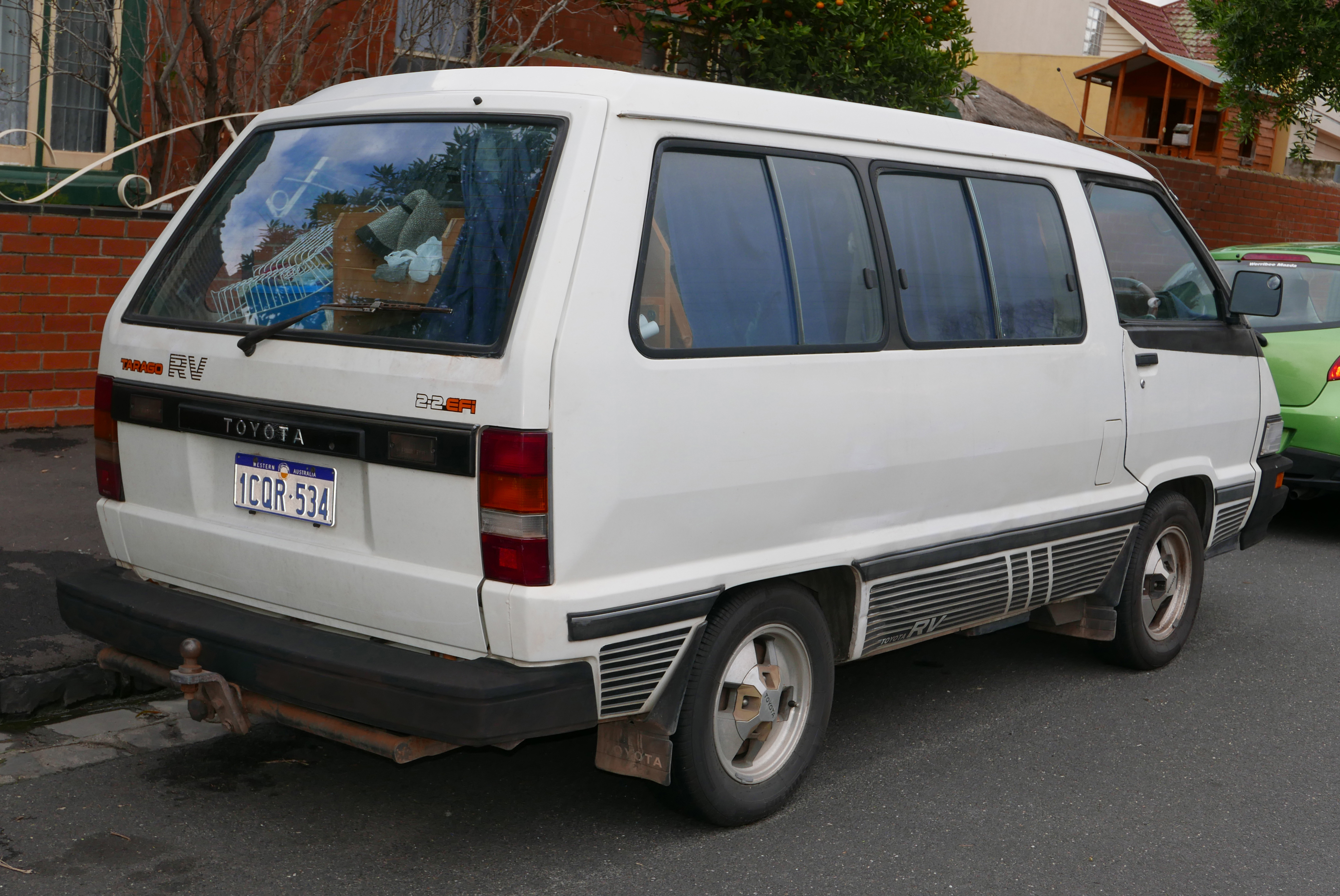
Toyota Tarago RV (YR22RG; facelift)

Toyota distributed the R20/R30 model worldwide under several names with either TownAce or MasterAce frontal styling depending on market. North American markets called it the "Toyota Van" (VanWagon in early press materials), while Australia referred to the vehicle as the Toyota Tarago (named after Tarago, New South Wales). In parts of Europe it was known as the "Toyota Space Cruiser", but in Germany, Sweden, Norway, China and some countries of Latin America it was sold as the "Toyota Model F". Export models were partially replaced with the Toyota Previa in 1990.

North American market sales started in 1983 for the 1984 model year as the "Toyota Van" with styling shared with the MasterAce Surf. The 2.0-liter 3Y-U EFI (87 hp or 65 kW) came at launch, but was replaced with the 2.2-liter 4Y-E engine with 102 hp (76 kW) for the 1986 model year facelift. Rear-wheel drive versions were sold in the United States between 1983 and 1989, while four-wheel drive models were sold between 1987 and 1989. The four-wheel drive models came with skid plates, with manual transmission models including a transfer case with low and high ranges (automatic models lacked a low range). All trim levels starting in 1986 had a cornering lamp system. Toyota's advertising campaign referred to the passenger vans (DLX and LE trim levels) as the "Wonderwagon" while the CRG trim level was referred to as the "Cargo Van". Deluxe and LE (Limited Edition) versions were offered as well as an ice maker/refrigerator between the front seats. The Van also offered dual air conditioning, captains chairs (LE for the 1986 to 1989 model years), twin sunroofs, digital clock, satellite radio controls (LE for the 1987 to 1989 model years), fog lights (LE for the 1986 to 1989 model years with power window package), tachometer, power locks, power windows, and a tinted glass privacy package. LE models had color matched bumpers and front grille along with power mirrors, chrome headlight bezels, and chrome Toyota emblems. Base models came with black bumpers and grill with white Toyota emblems. Base models have the reverse lights incorporated into the tail light assembly whereas the LE models had them incorporated into the rear hatch. In 1986, a special EXPO86 version was available in Canada only. The 1986 model year Espirit model was finished in a unique light blue color with a white wave pattern on the lower half on the side profile. A unique bronze colored plaque was affixed to the B-pillar behind the driver and passenger doors that said "Spirit of 86" inside a globe.

For the Australian market, the Tarago eight-seater launched in February 1983. Like European models, Tarago frontal styling mirrored the TownAce rather than MasterAce Surf—therefore single-unit headlamps and slimmer bumpers were on offer. At launch, three levels of trim were on offer—base DX, GL and luxury GLS—all fitted with the 1.8-liter 2Y-C gasoline engine rated at 57 kW (76 hp) and 140 N⋅m (100 lb⋅ft) (designated YR20). The 2.0-liter 2C diesel giving 48 kW (64 hp) and 118 N⋅m (87 lb⋅ft) arrived in July 1983 as an option for the DX trim (designated CR21RG). Five-speed manual transmission was standard, with four-speed automatic on the GLS model that also added power steering, dual zone air-conditioning, power windows, a moonroof, alloy wheels, an ice box, and from October 1984—cruise control and front seat armrests. Gasoline models received an engine upgrade in March 1984 to the 2.0-liter 3Y-C rated at 65 kW (87 hp) and 162 N⋅m (119 lb⋅ft) (designated YR21), with the DX and GL now gaining the option of a three-speed automatic. With an October 1985 facelift, the MasterAce Surf styling updates were specified—thus twin headlamps and bulky bumpers now featured alongside trim and equipment upgrades. At the same time, the YR21 GL became the GX, and a series of 2.2-liter 4Y-E gasoline models with 75 kW (101 hp) and 180 N⋅m (130 lb⋅ft) appeared in the new manual-only GLi and updated automatic GLS (YR22). The GLS also gained a high-roof skylight and individual second row chairs, which reduced its carrying capacity to seven people. A new GLi Xtra Trak four-wheel drive also arrived in October 1985 with the 2.2 gasoline engine (YR31). By early 1987, escalating sales led to the introduction of a budget-conscious RV 2.2-liter gasoline manual (rear-wheel drive). By 1988, the optional three-speed automatic had completely made way for the four-speed unit on the DX (YR21), GLi (YR22) and GLi Xtra Trak (YR31). In late 1988 the GX gained the 2.2-liter engine to become the GXi; at the same time a series of refinements were implemented across the range.

For the Chinese market, licensed production of the TownAce was carried out by Golden Dragon as the XML6390. The TownAce was one of the few products that Golden Dragon bought from Toyota, alongside the later HiAce H100 and the third generation Toyota Coaster.

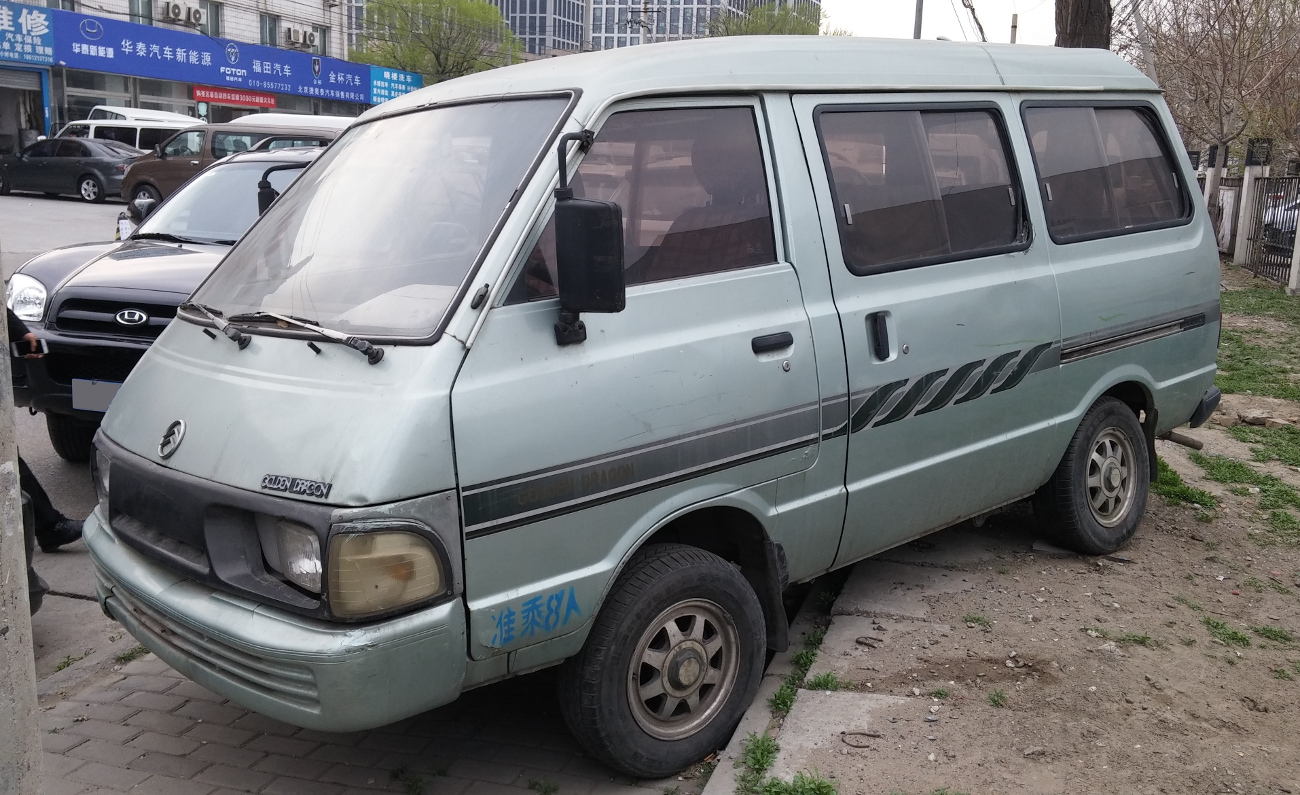
Golden Dragon Haise XML6402 (front)

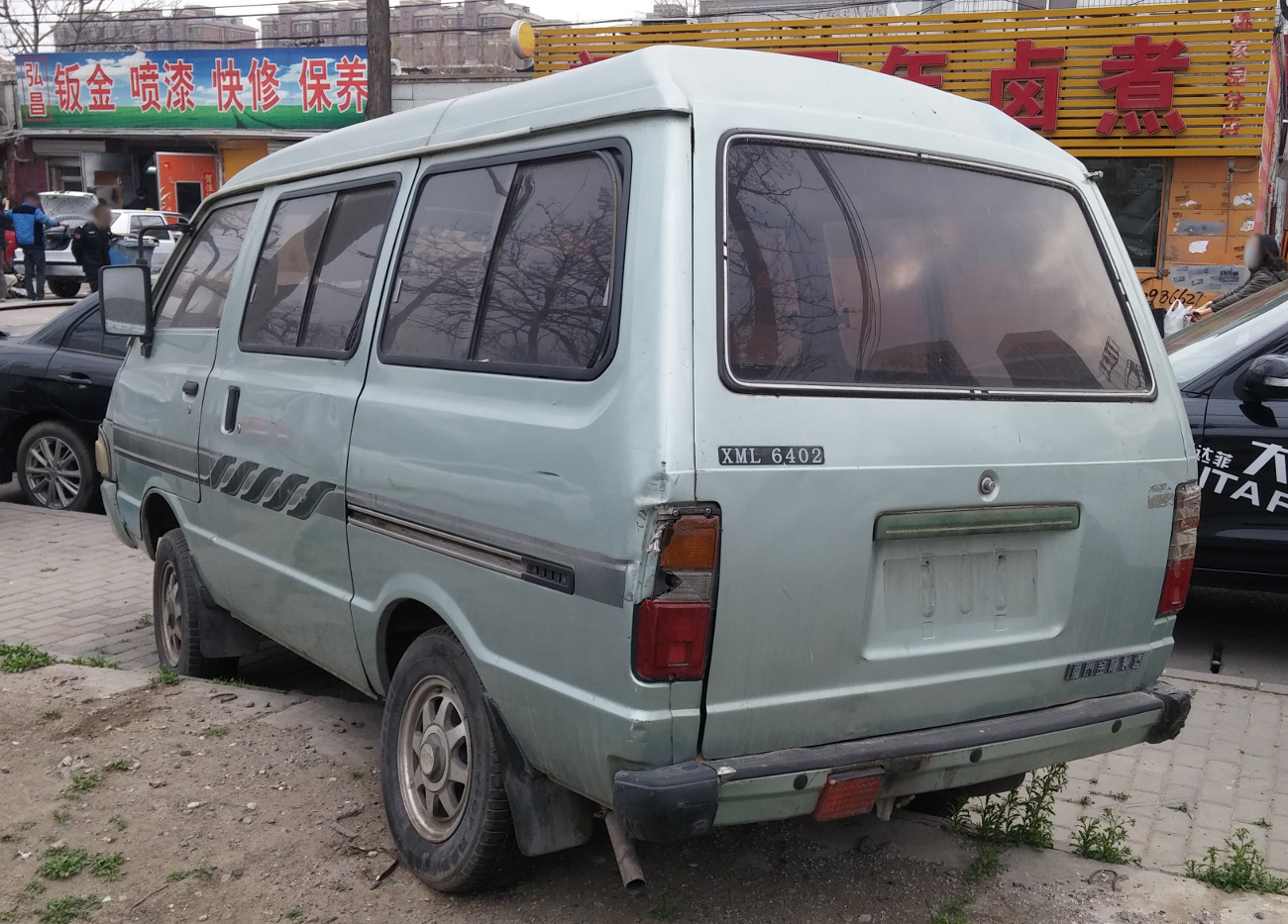
Golden Dragon Haise XML6402 (rear)

=== 1992–1996 (R20, R30 rebodied) LiteAce van, TownAce van ===
R20, R30 rebodied
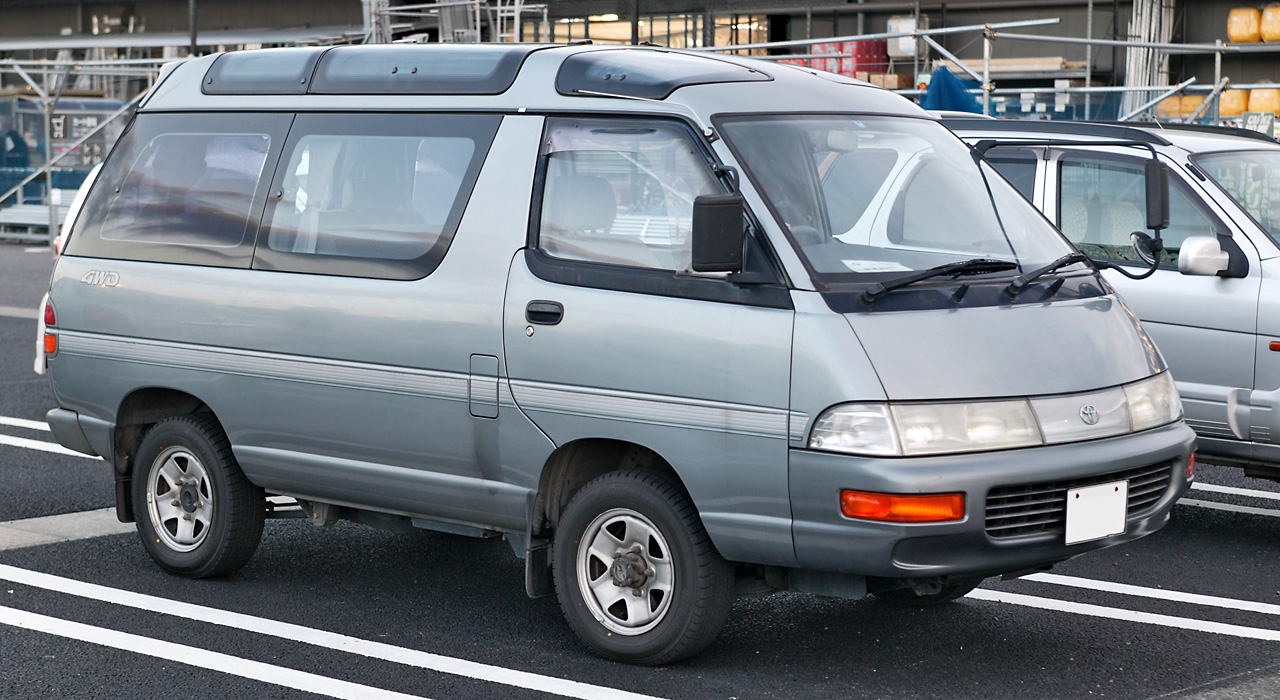
- 1993–1996 TownAce wagon 4WD Super Extra (CR31G)

Overview
- Also called: Toyota Spacia (Australia); Toyota Lotto (Sri Lanka); Daihatsu Delta Wide (B20/B30); Wanli LiteAce (China JV)
- Production: January 1992 – September 1996
- Assembly: Japan: Kariya, Aichi

Body and chassis
- Body style: 4-door van/wagon
- Layout: Front-engine, rear-wheel-drive; Front-engine, four-wheel-drive

Powertrain
- Engine: Gasoline: 2.0 L 3Y-EU I4; 2.2 L 4Y-E I4; Diesel: 2.0 L 2C I4; 2.0 L 2C-T turbo I4; 2.2 L 3C-T turbo I4
- Transmission: 5-speed manual; 4-speed automatic

Dimensions
- Wheelbase: 2,235 mm (88.0 in)
- Length: 4,360 mm (171.7 in) (van)
- Width: 1,690 mm (66.5 in) (van)
- Height: 1,800 mm (70.9 in) (van)
- Curb weight: 3,284.89 lb (1,490 kg)

The rebodied R20/R30 was introduced in January 1992 and produced until September 1996. For this series, the mechanicals were largely carried over (hence the retention of the R20/R30 chassis codes), but the styling fully refreshed. At this time, the LiteAce van became a derivative of the TownAce line, sharing the latter's body work. Thus, from this time, the entire LiteAce and TownAce range (van and truck) were unified. The rebodied R20/R30 had a much more streamlined design. The LiteAce and TownAce commercial vans were very similar, differing by the TownAce receiving extra headlamps adjacent inside to the main units and a small air intake slit. The LiteAce did not have this intake, but instead had additional grilles where the extra lamps in the TownAce were. Passenger wagons of both models had different styling again. Here, the LiteAce front end featured two separate headlamp units that tapered inwards towards the Toyota logo. TownAce wagons had headlamps that sat flush with a translucent garnish that gave the appearance of a large, single headlamp. Rear styling also differed between the commercial vans and passenger wagons, although both models used the same rear-end regardless if badged LiteAce or TownAce.

Toyota Australia released the TownAce commercial van in April 1992, with the eight-seater passenger wagon model arriving in October 1993 as the Toyota Spacia. The powertrain fitted comprised the 2.2-liter 4Y-E with 75 kW (101 hp) and 180 N⋅m (130 lb⋅ft) paired to a five-speed manual or four-speed automatic transmission. Equipment levels were sparse, although basic amenities like power steering, cloth trim and a radio/cassette player were fitted.

Daihatsu Delta Wide

As with the original B20 series, Daihatsu Delta Wide van/wagon versions continued to use TownAce body work (and front-end styling). This B20/B30 update was strictly badge engineering, with no other material detail changes. Wagon trim levels were the basic SE and better equipped SQ.

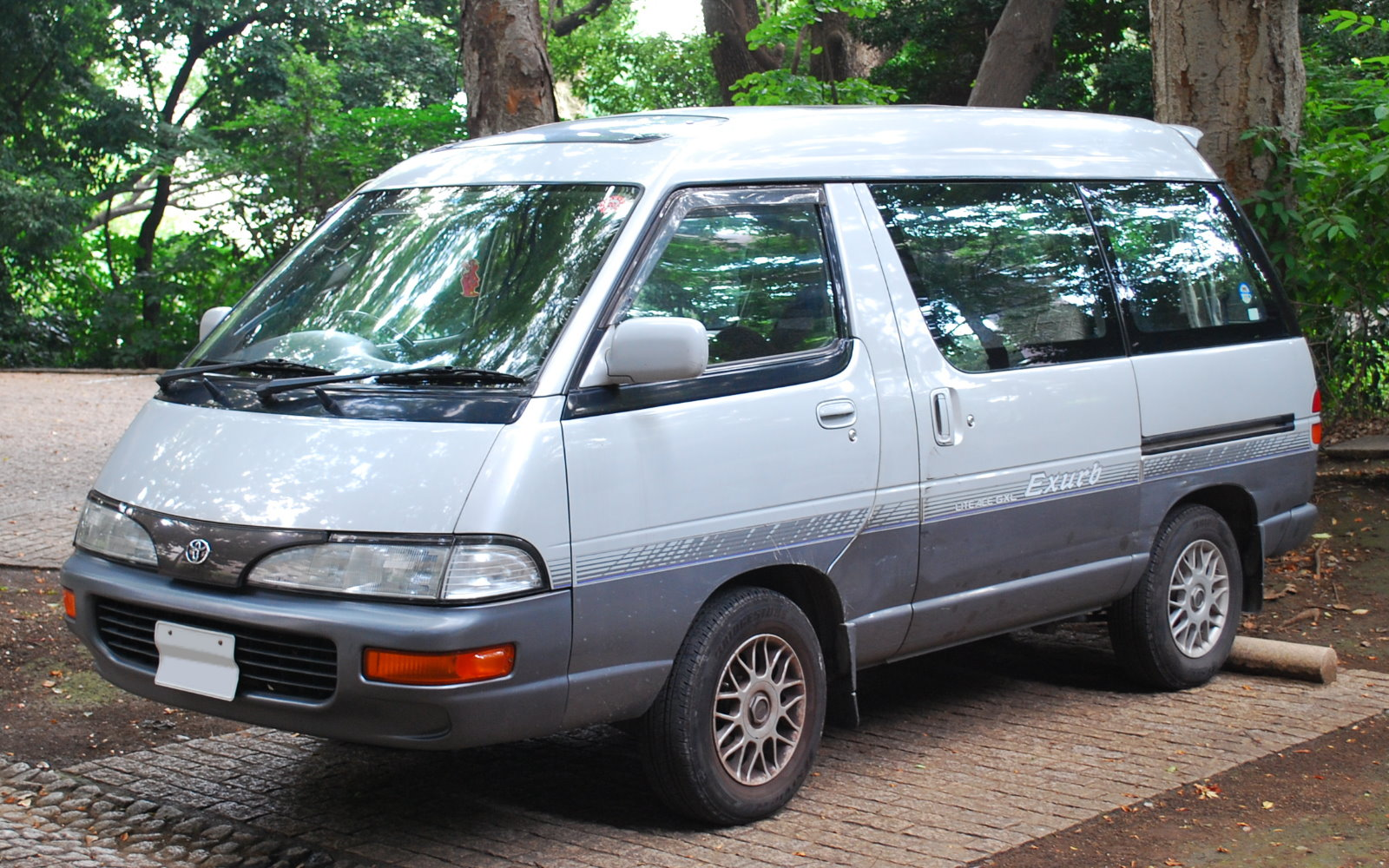
1992–1996 LiteAce wagon

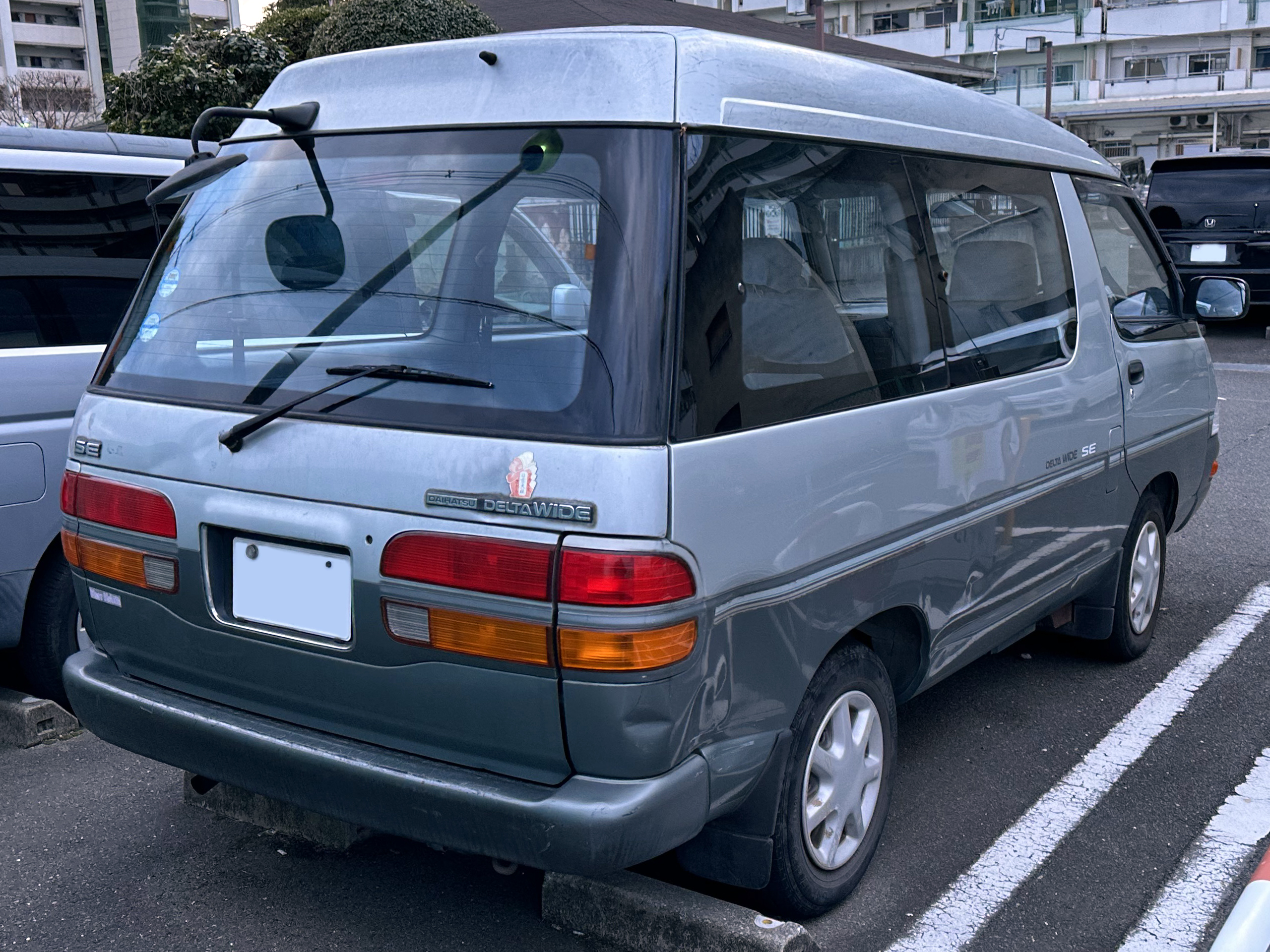
1992–1993 Daihatsu Delta Wide wagon

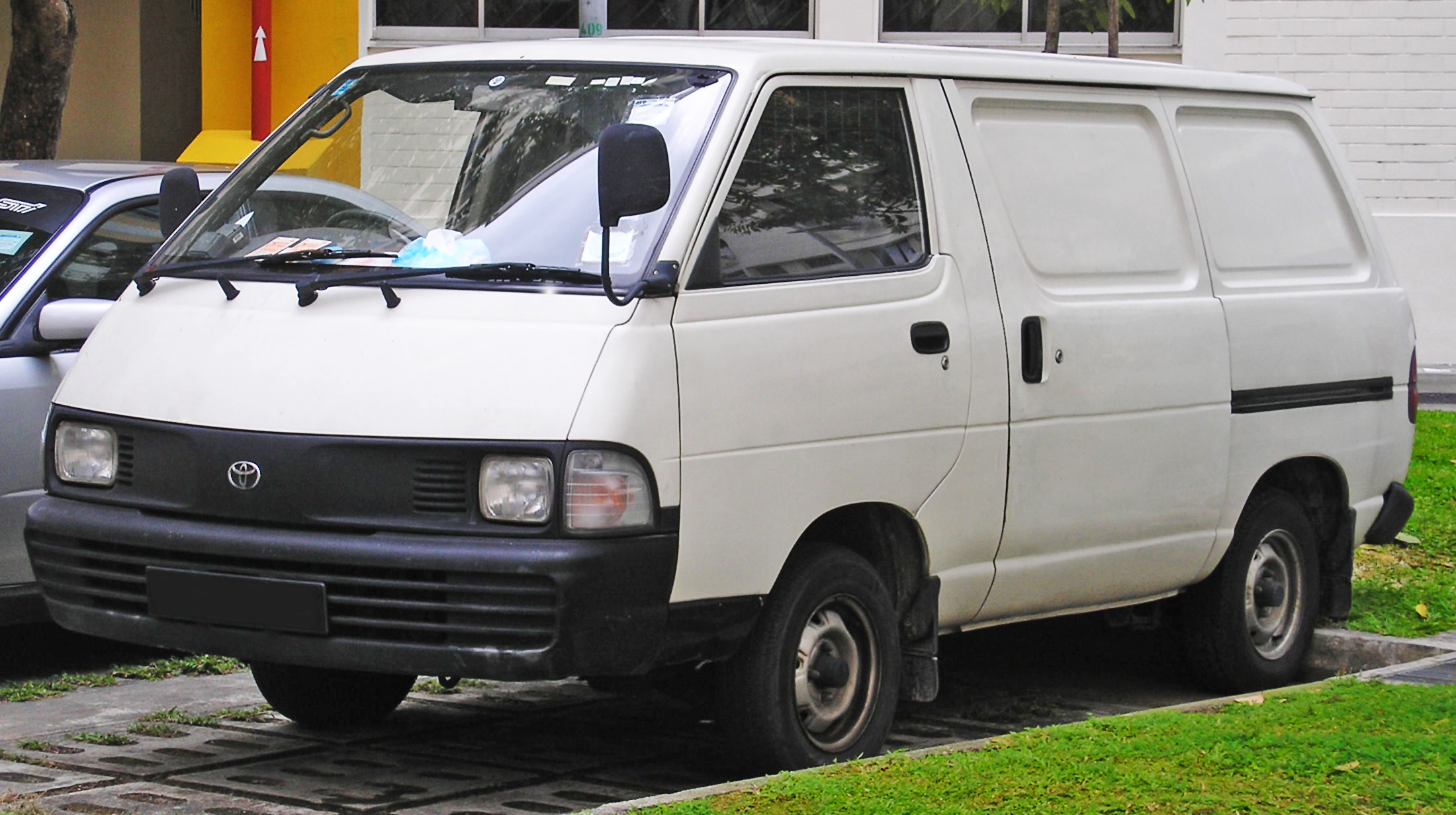
1992–1996 LiteAce van

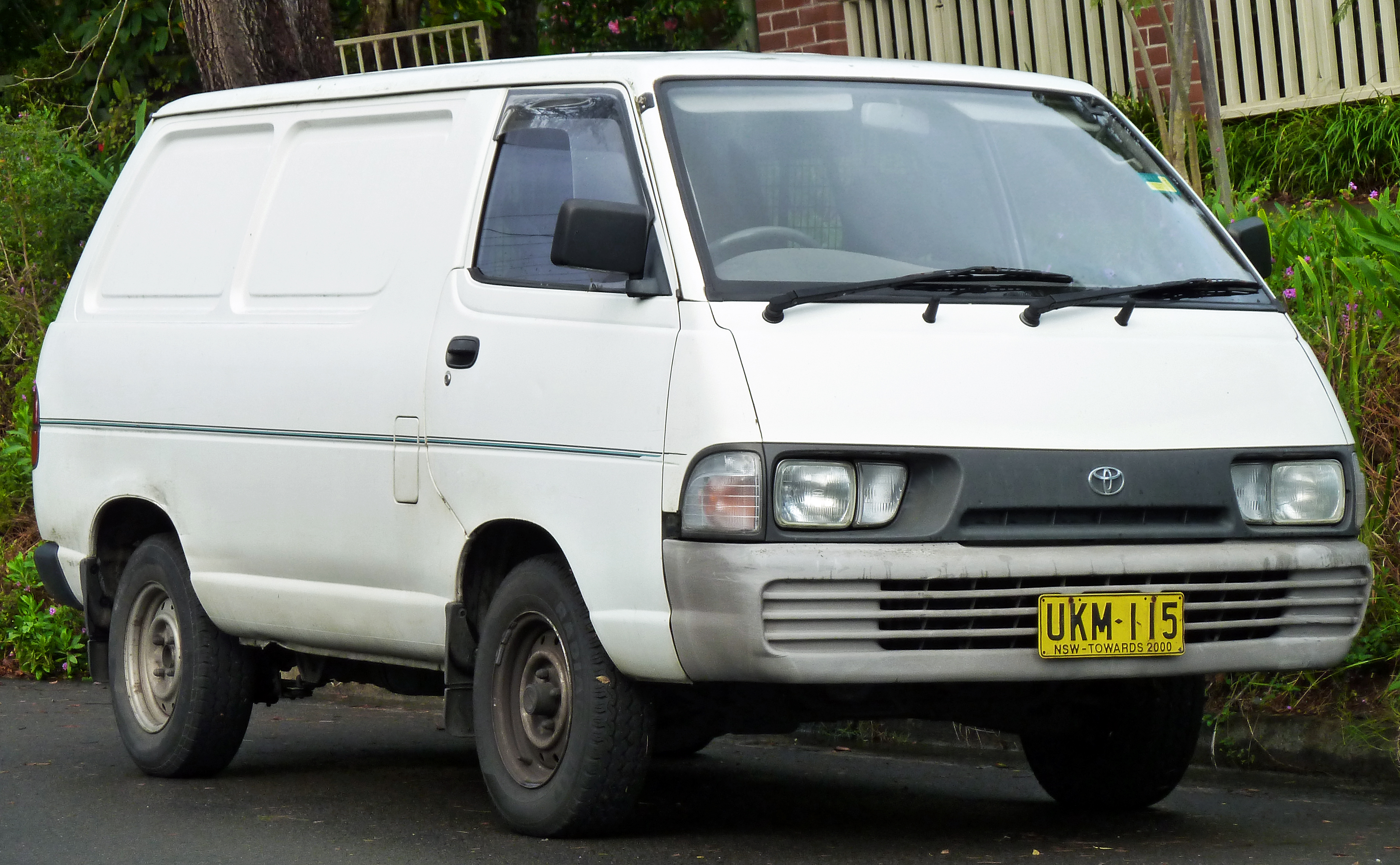
1992–1996 TownAce van

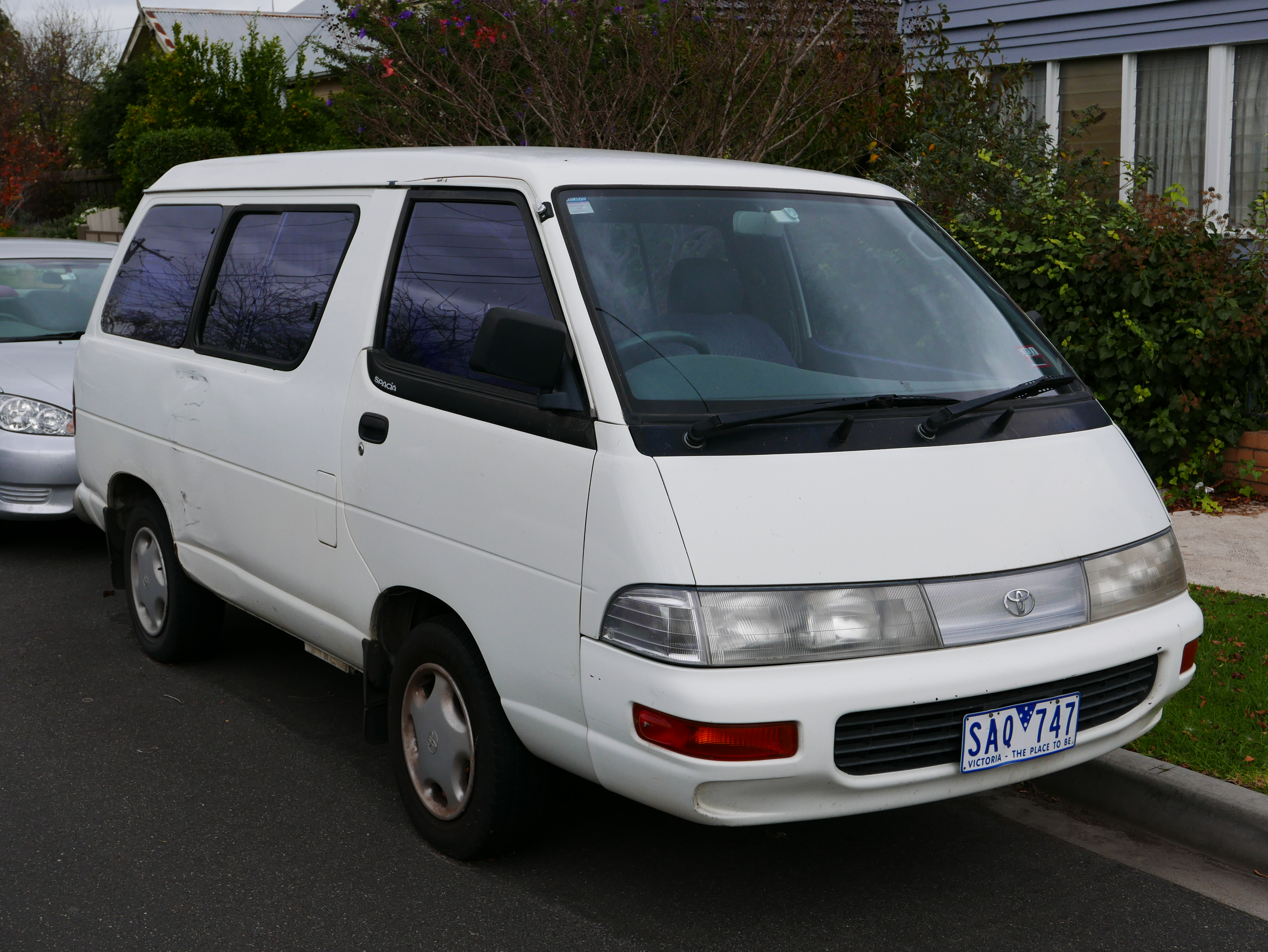
1993–1996 Spacia GXi van

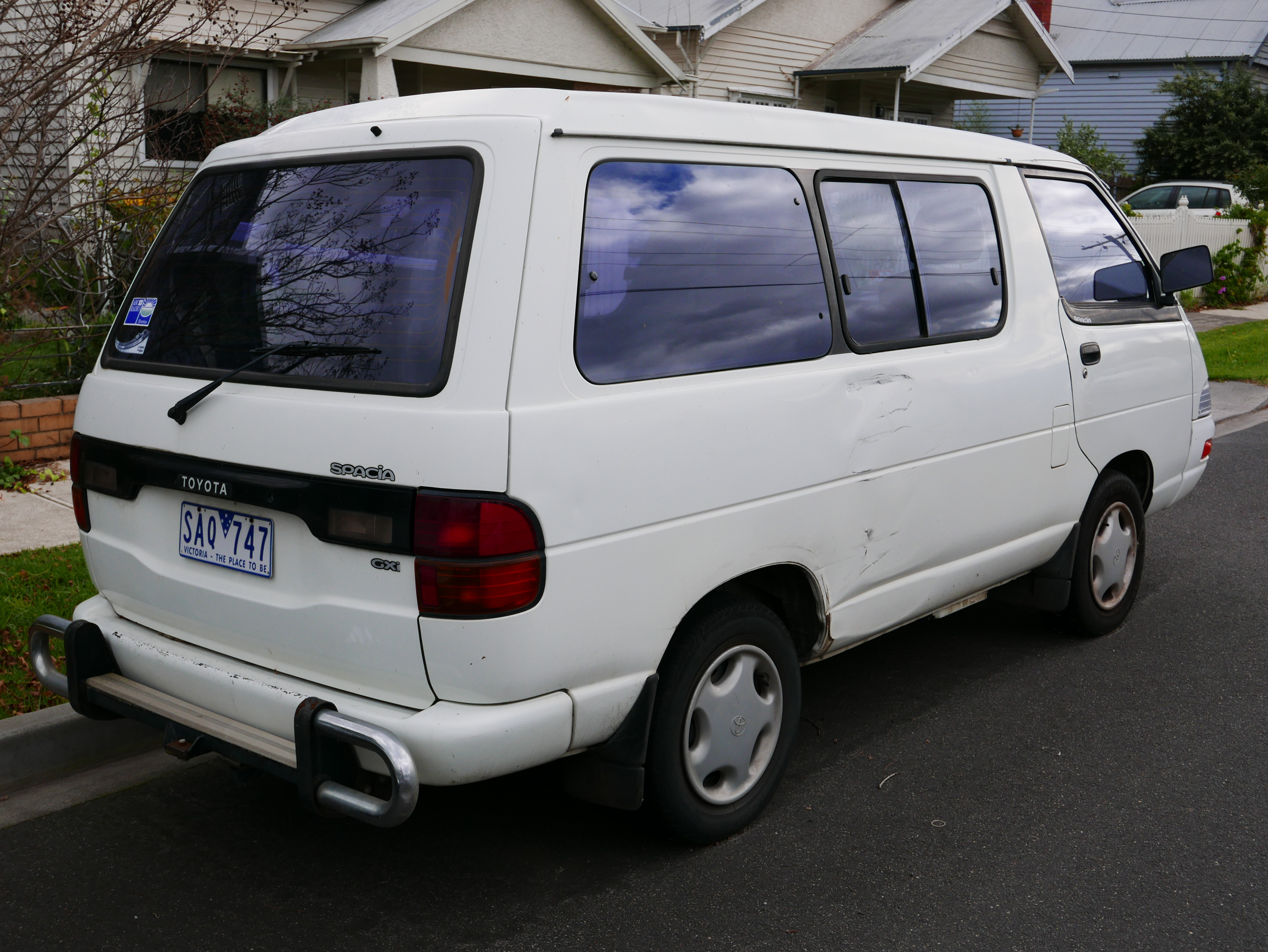
1993–1996 Spacia GXi van

=== 1996–2007 (R40, R50) LiteAce van, TownAce van ===
R40, R50
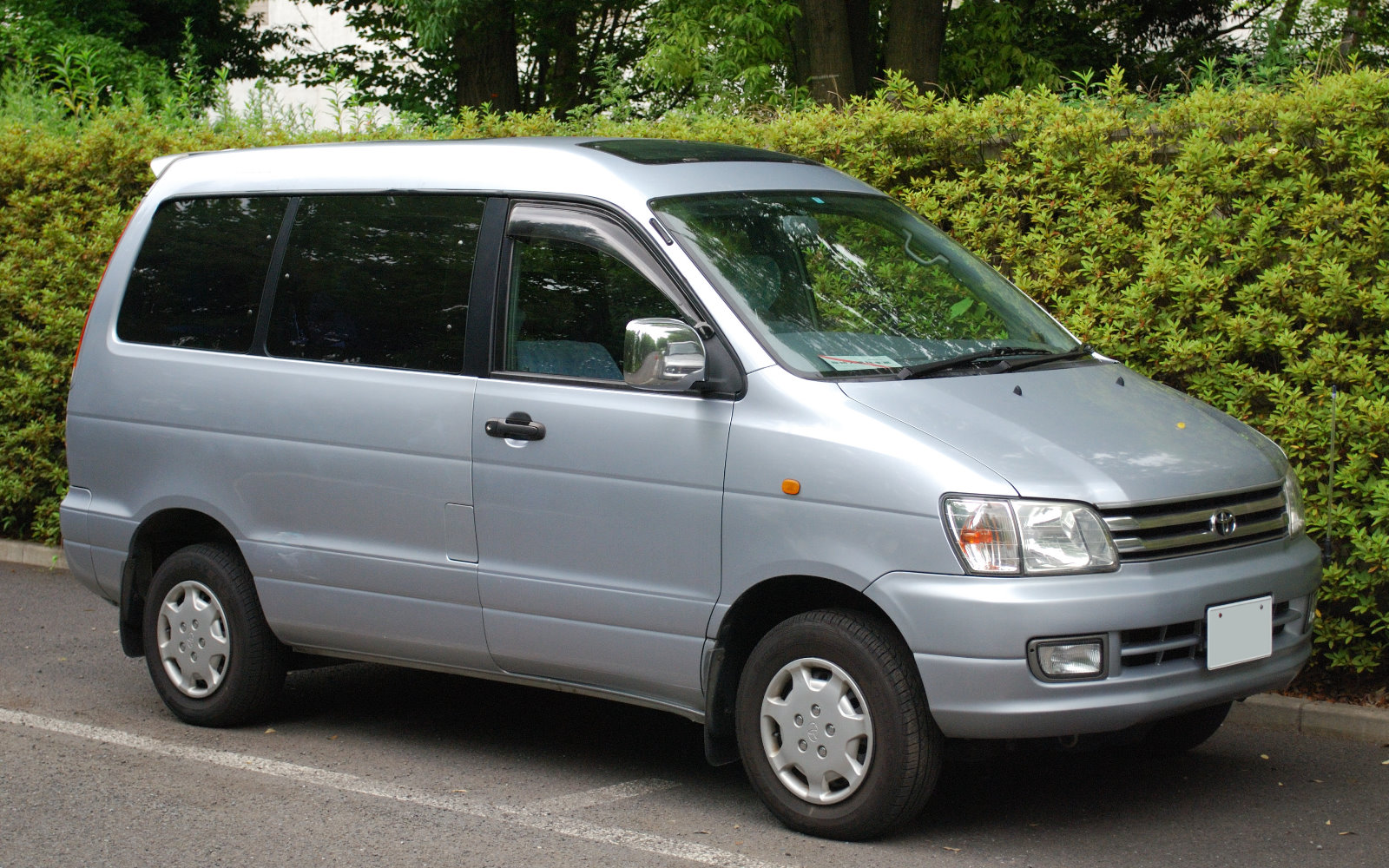
- 1996–1998 TownAce Noah

Overview
- Also called: Toyota Spacia (Australia); Daihatsu Delta Van
- Production: October 1996 – July 2007
- Assembly: Japan: Ikeda, Osaka (Daihatsu); Kariya, Aichi (Toyota Auto Body); Toyota, Aichi (Honsha plant; 1996–2001)

Body and chassis
- Body style: 4/5-door van/wagon
- Layout: Front-engine, rear-wheel-drive; Front-engine, four-wheel-drive

Powertrain
- Engine: gasoline: 1486 cc 5K I4; 1781 cc 7K I4; 1781 cc 7K-E I4; 1998 cc 3S-FE I4; diesel: 1974 cc 2C I4; 2184 cc 3C-E I4; 2184 cc 3C-T turbo I4
- Transmission: 5-speed manual; 4-speed automatic

Dimensions
- Wheelbase: 2,715 mm (106.9 in)
- Length: 4,435 mm (174.6 in)
- Width: 1,695 mm (66.7 in)
- Height: 1,905 mm (75.0 in) (low roof); 1,935 mm (76.2 in) (high roof)
- Curb weight: 1,420–1,440 kg (3,130–3,170 lb)

Chronology
- Successor: Toyota Noah (for LiteAce/TownAce Noah)

Fully redesigned for the first time since 1982, the R40 and R50 LiteAce and TownAce appeared in October 1996. Offered in van/wagon configurations only, the van sold as the LiteAce and TownAce, with wagons now designated LiteAce Noah and TownAce Noah and fitted with a different, more luxurious interior. As with previous generation, LiteAce and TownAce were differentiated by their front grille designs. Vans were badged DX (for cargo purposes) and GL (dual purpose). Noah models received standard anti-lock brakes and optional twin moonroofs (the Skylite roof was discontinued).

To meet new occupant safety regulations, the cab-over, mid-mounted engine was moved in front of the passenger compartment (semi-cab-over), giving the car an all-new look, although a move inline with the vehicle's competitors. Despite the trend among its Japanese competitors of switching to the front-wheel drive layout, the R40/R50 maintained its rear-wheel drive. Full-time four-wheel drive was optional, replacing the part-time configuration from the previous series. Body dimensions remained compliant within the limits of the "number five" category, and standard- and high-roof heights were on offer. Noah passenger models had three-row seating with either six, seven, or eight occupant positions—made up by having either three rows of two bucket seats, two rows of buckets and third-row bench seat, or buckets up front and benches for the two back rows. A flat floor allowed for walk-through access between the rows.

Vans were supplied with several gasoline engines, including the 1486 cc 5K (discontinued in July 2002) and two 1781 cc units, the 7K and 7K-E. Power outputs are 70 PS (51 kW) for the smaller, 5K engine and 76 or 82 PS (56 or 60 kW) for the larger 7Ks. Diesel options were the 1974 cc 2C until June 1999 and after this, the 2184 cc 3C-E. Powertrain options for the Noah twins comprised either the gasoline 1998 cc 3S-FE good for 130 PS (96 kW) or turbocharged diesel 2184 cc 3C-T (KD-CR40/50G) with 91 PS (67 kW) or the 3C-TE (KH-CR40/50G) with 94 PS (69 kW). Transmission were either a five-speed manual with a floor shifter or a column-mounted four-speed automatic.

In January 1998, there were minor improvements, including a navigation system that became optional for the Noah, and an increase in performance of diesel engines. In December 1998, the Noah passenger models were facelifted with reshaped headlamps, new grilles and front bumpers, plus clear turn signal lamps for the tail-lamps and revised wheel trims. Vans were facelifted in June 1999 with new grilles and clear turn signal new tail-lamps. In November 2001, production of the LiteAce Noah and TownAce Noah models ended in favor of the new Toyota Noah/Voxy. Diesel engines were discontinued in August 2004 as they did not comply with emissions standards. Vans were again facelifted in July 2005, with fender mirrors added in conjunction with the existing door-mounted wing mirrors. This series was manufactured at the Honsha plant Toyota, Aichi until December 2001, before switching to a Toyota Auto Body plant in January 2002 until end of manufacture in July 2007.

Export

Toyota Australia offered the KR42R series TownAce commercial vans from January 1997 to 2003, with a 1999 facelift. TownAces featured the 7K engine with 56 kW (75 hp) and 142 N⋅m (105 lb⋅ft) and five-speed manual or four-speed automatic.

Eight-seater passenger vans were released in Australia as the single-grade Spacia in January 1998. With the 3S-FE rated at 94 kW (126 hp) and 180 N⋅m (130 lb⋅ft) and five-speed manual or four-speed automatic, the Spacia offered standard dual front airbags, power door locks, power steering, windows and mirrors. Anti-lock brakes and second-row air-conditioning were optional. Facelifted models arrived in January 1999 and the Value Pack of 2000 and 2001 added dual air-conditioning, a CD player, and parking sensors. The model line was discontinued during August 2002.

Daihatsu Delta Van/Wagon

This generation was also sold as the Daihatsu Delta Van/Wagon between October 1996 and November 2001. The grille treatments were as per the TownAce (van) and TownAce Noah (wagon) styles.

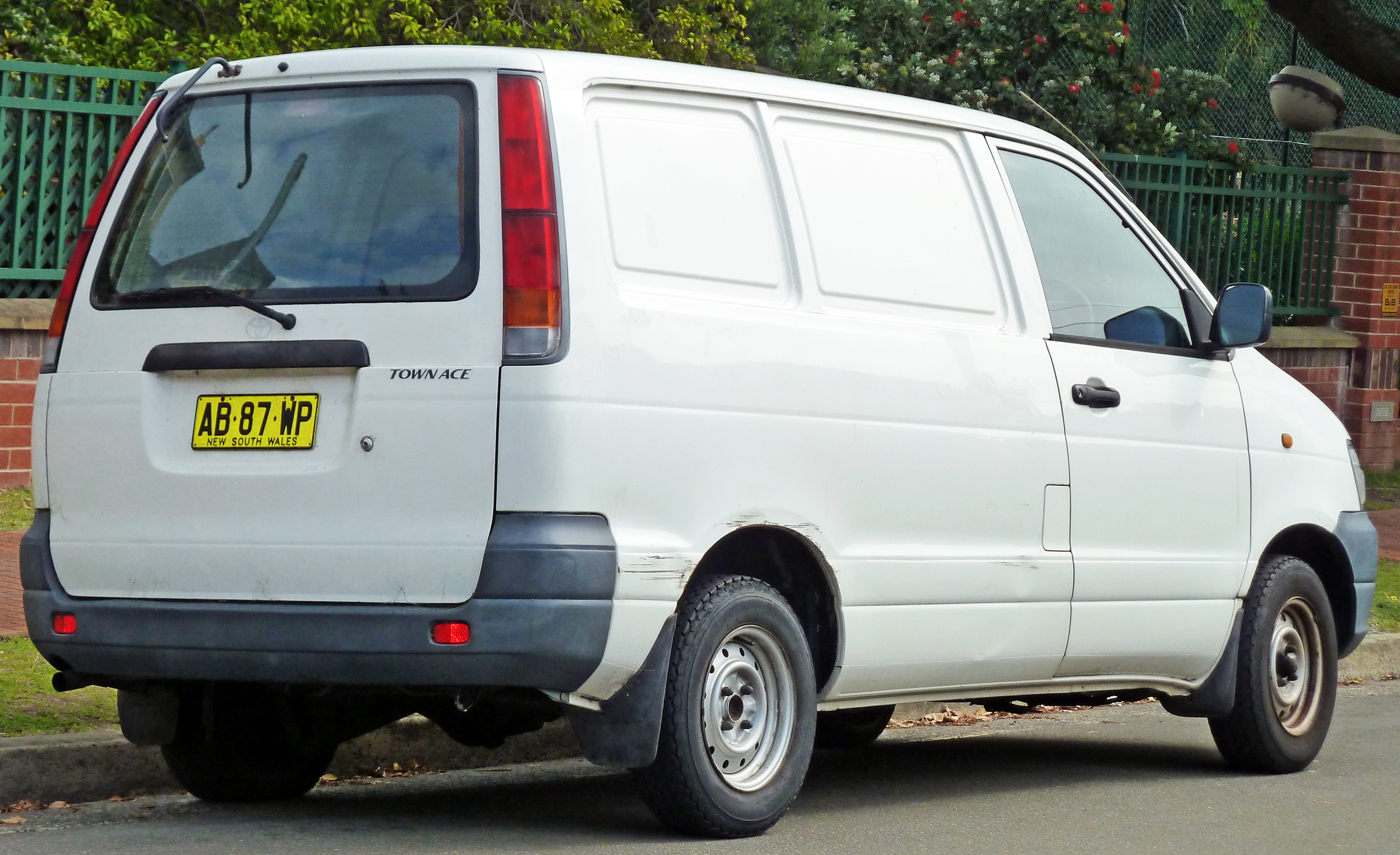
1996–1999 TownAce (KR42R)

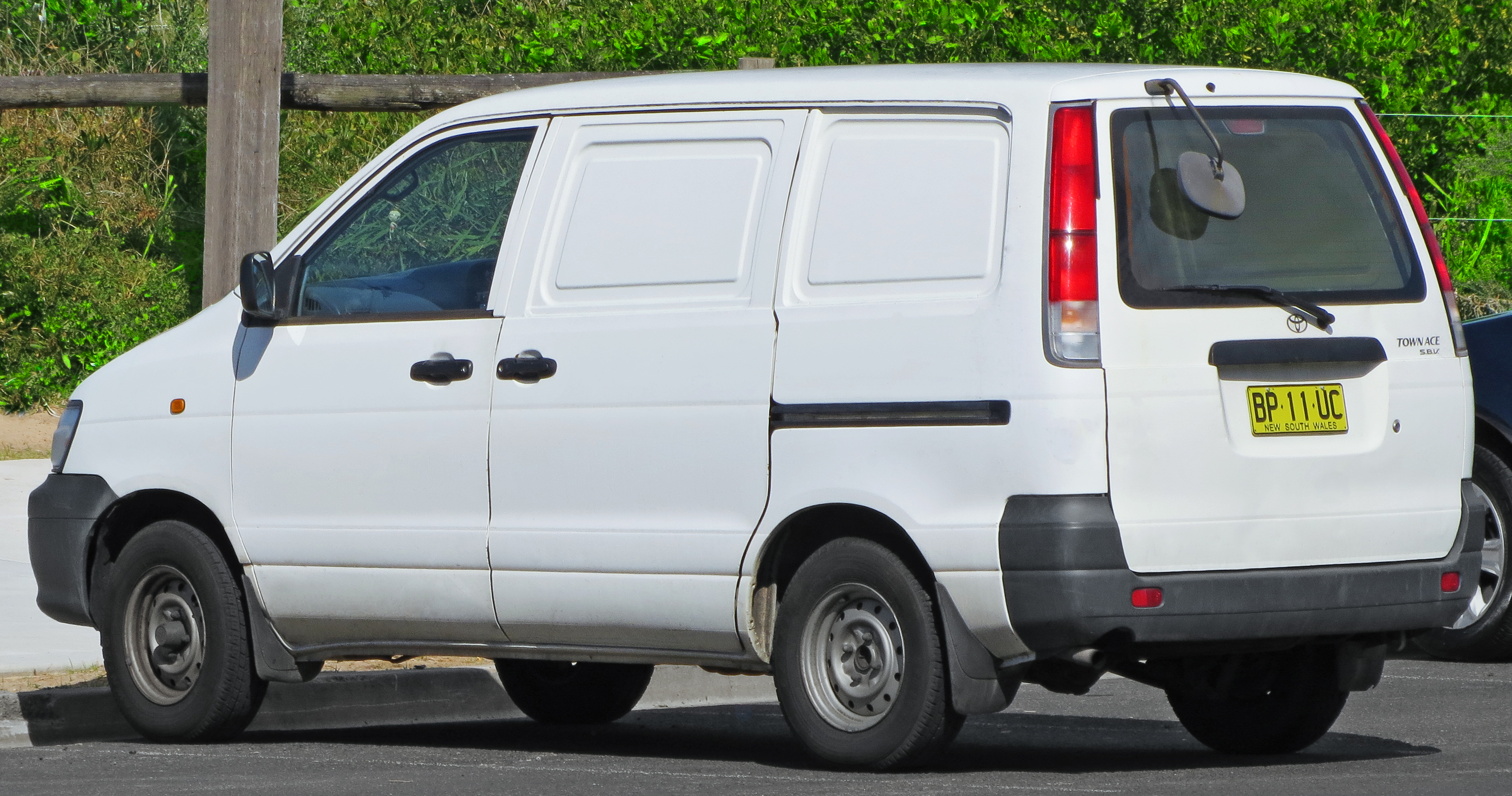
1999–2005 TownAce (KR42R)

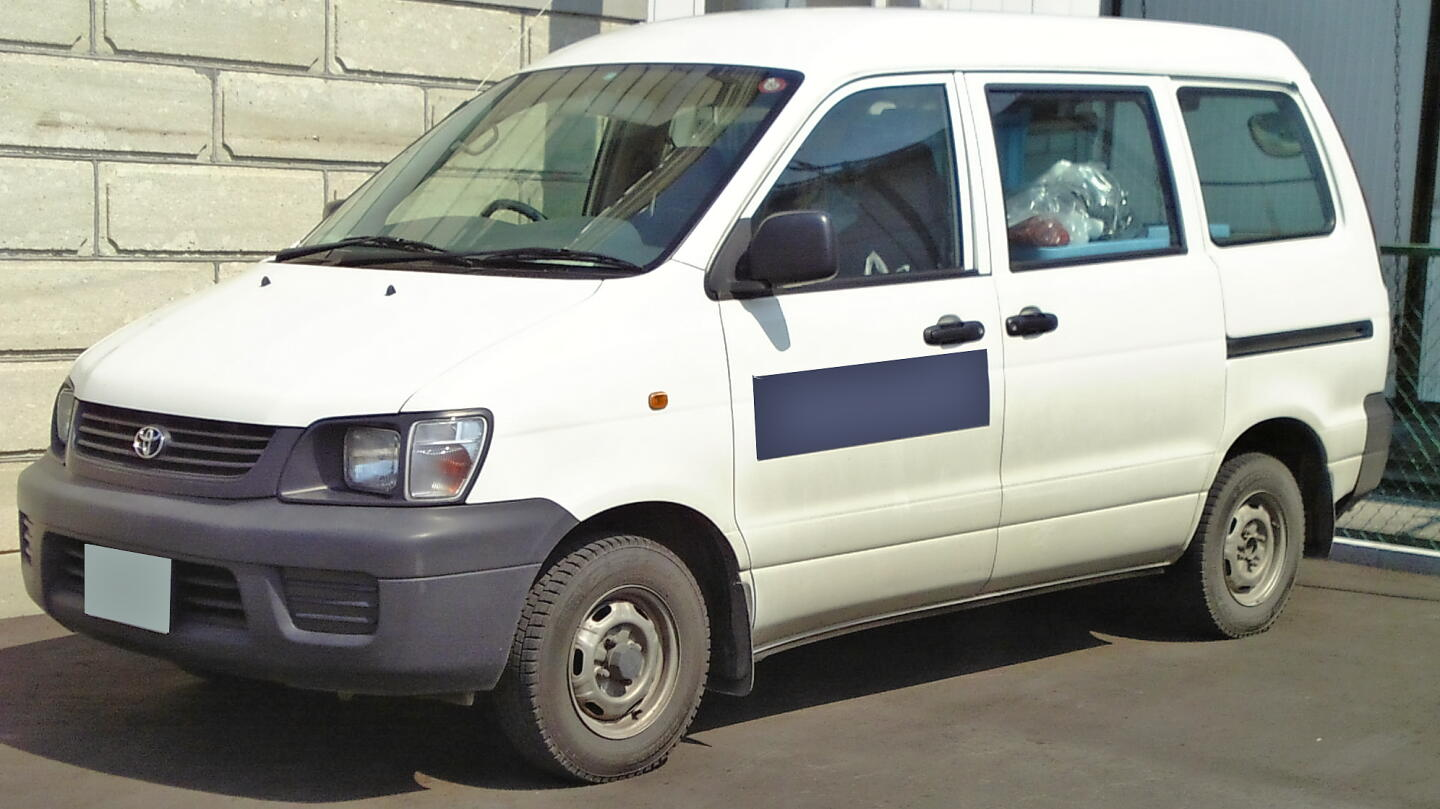
1999–2005 LiteAce

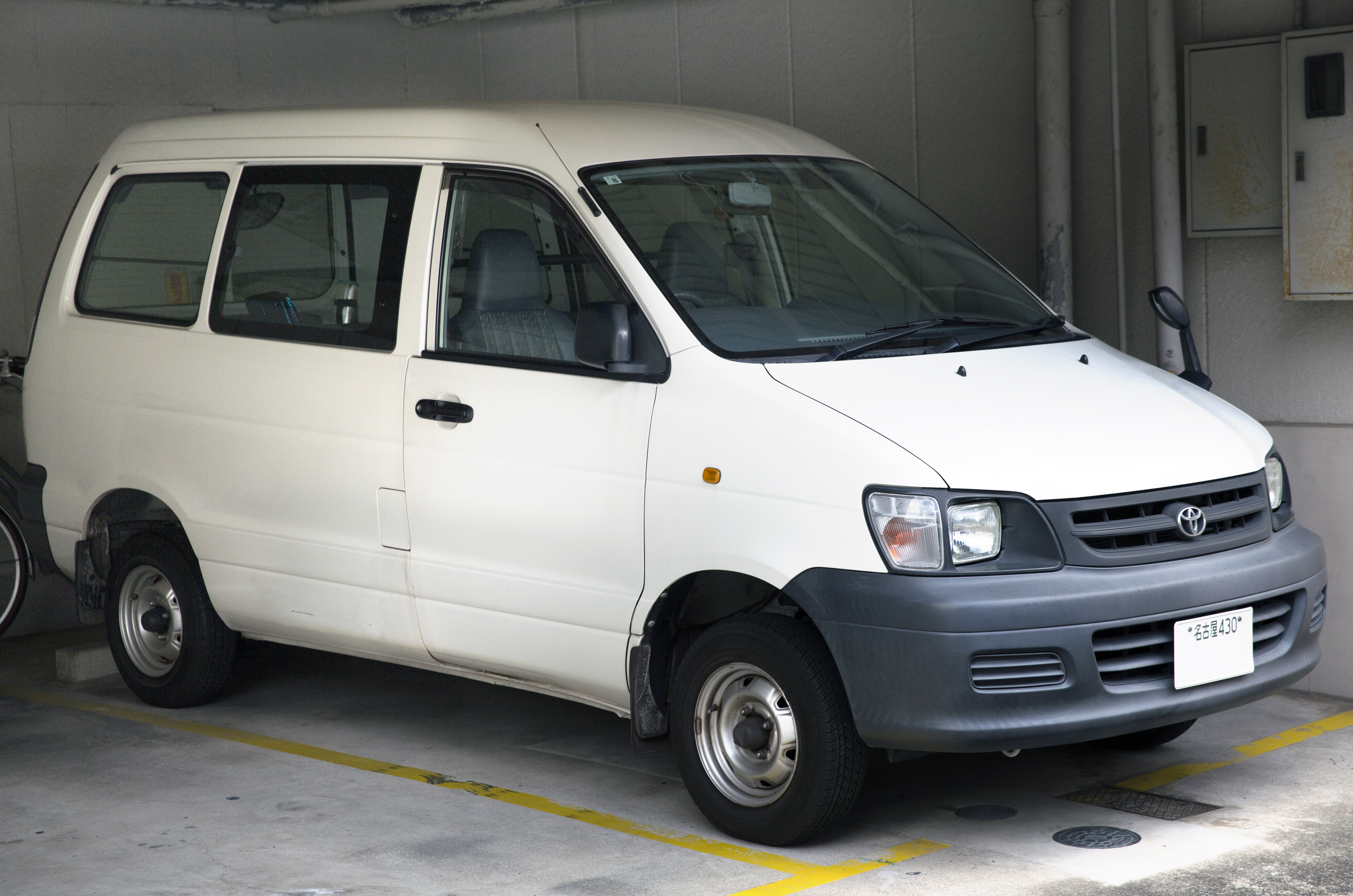
2005–2007 TownAce

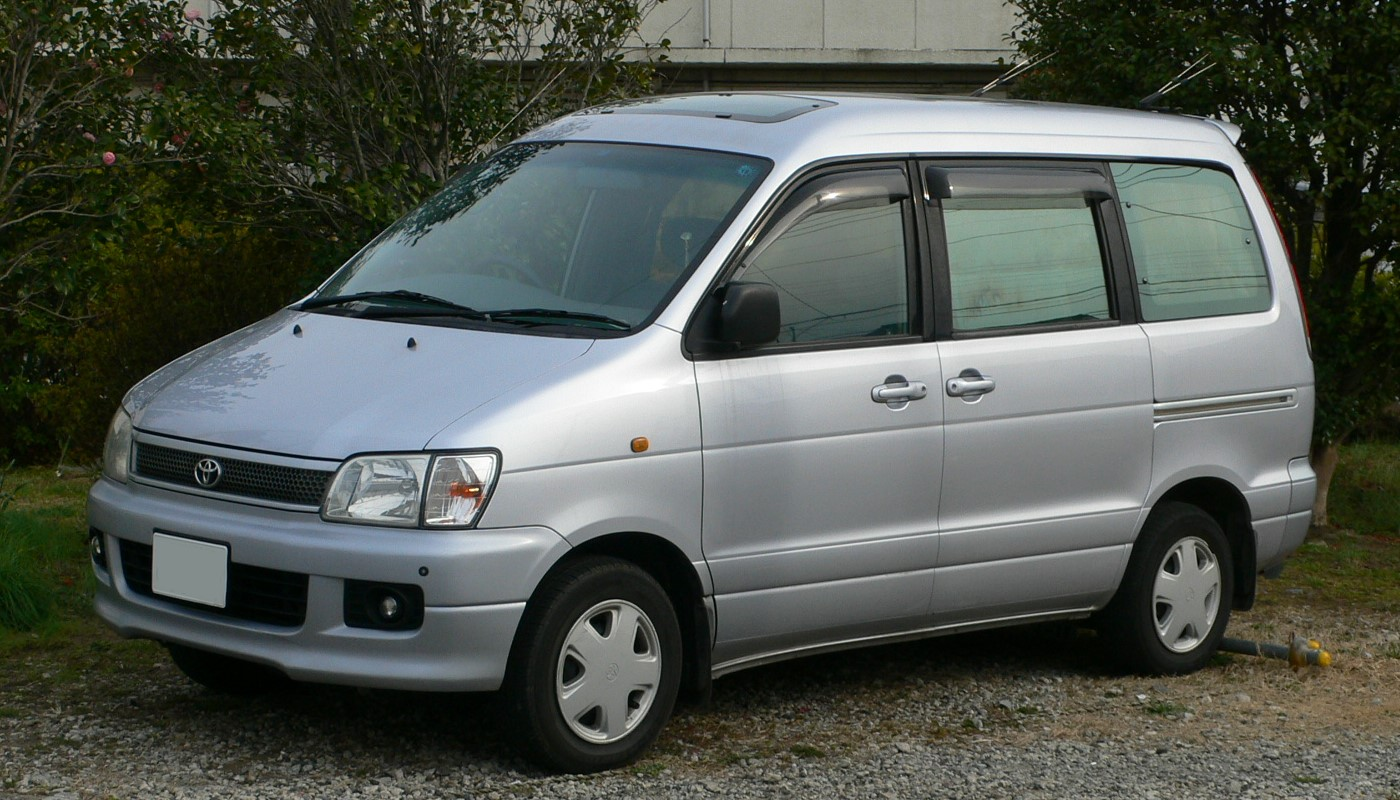
1996–1998 LiteAce Noah

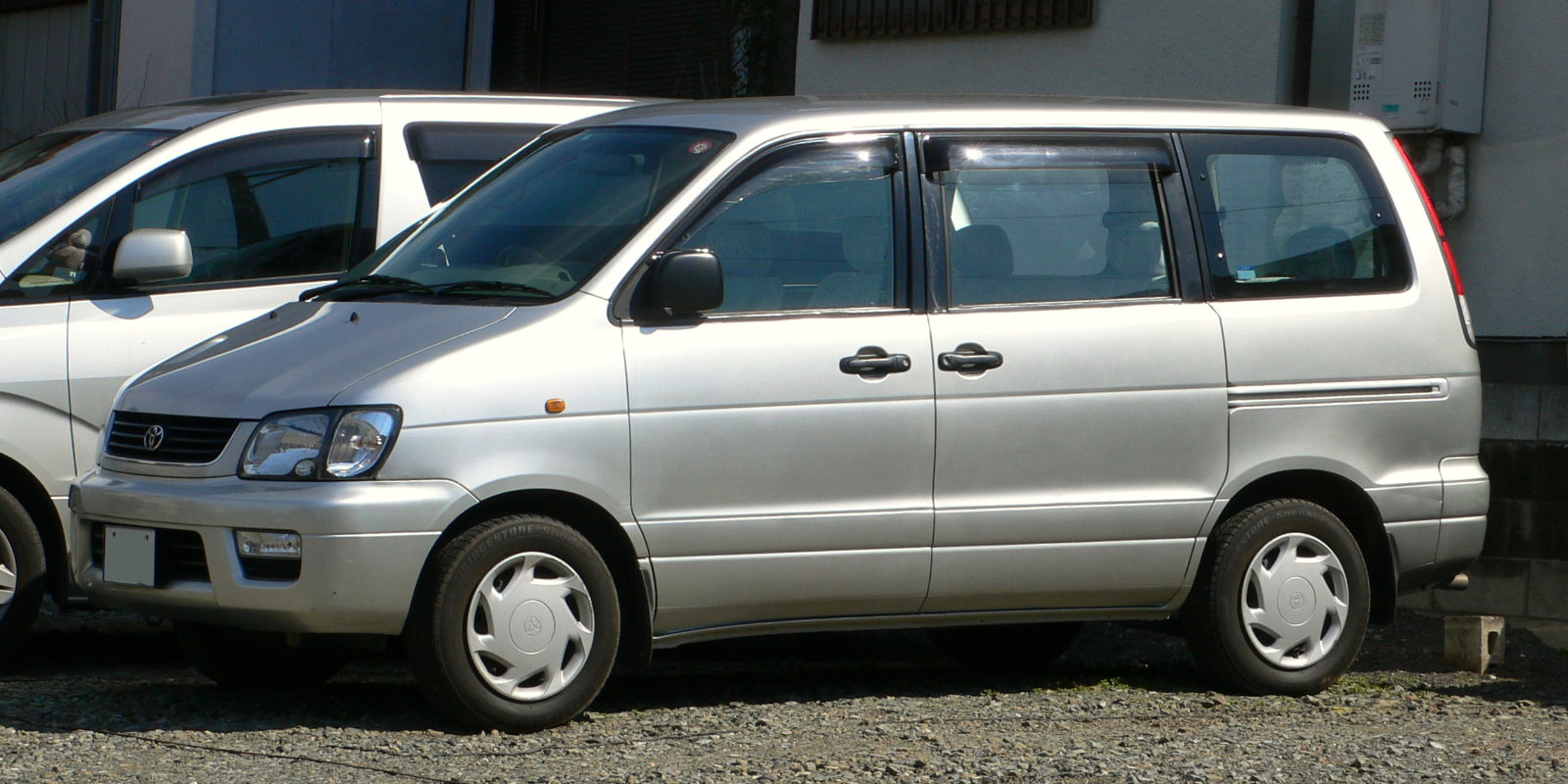
1998–2001 LiteAce Noah

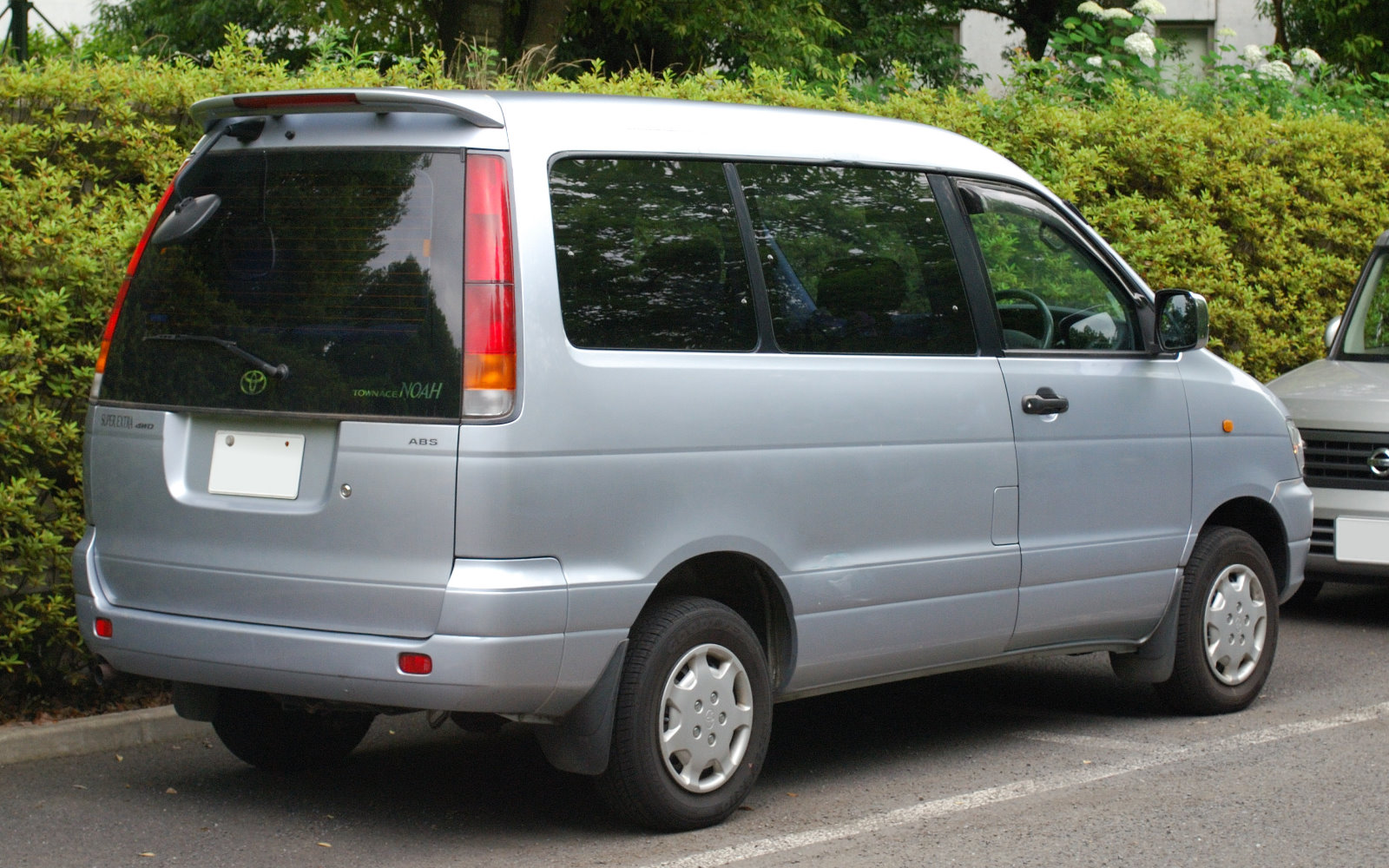
1996–1998 TownAce Noah

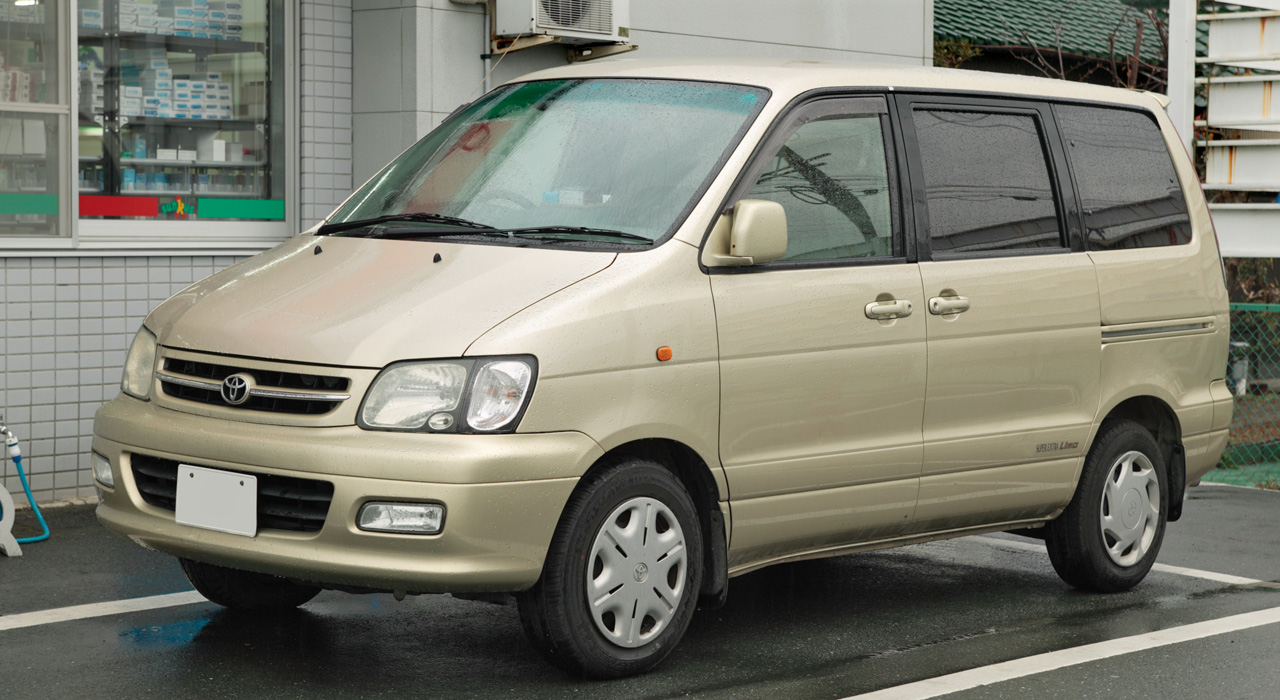
1998–2001 TownAce Noah

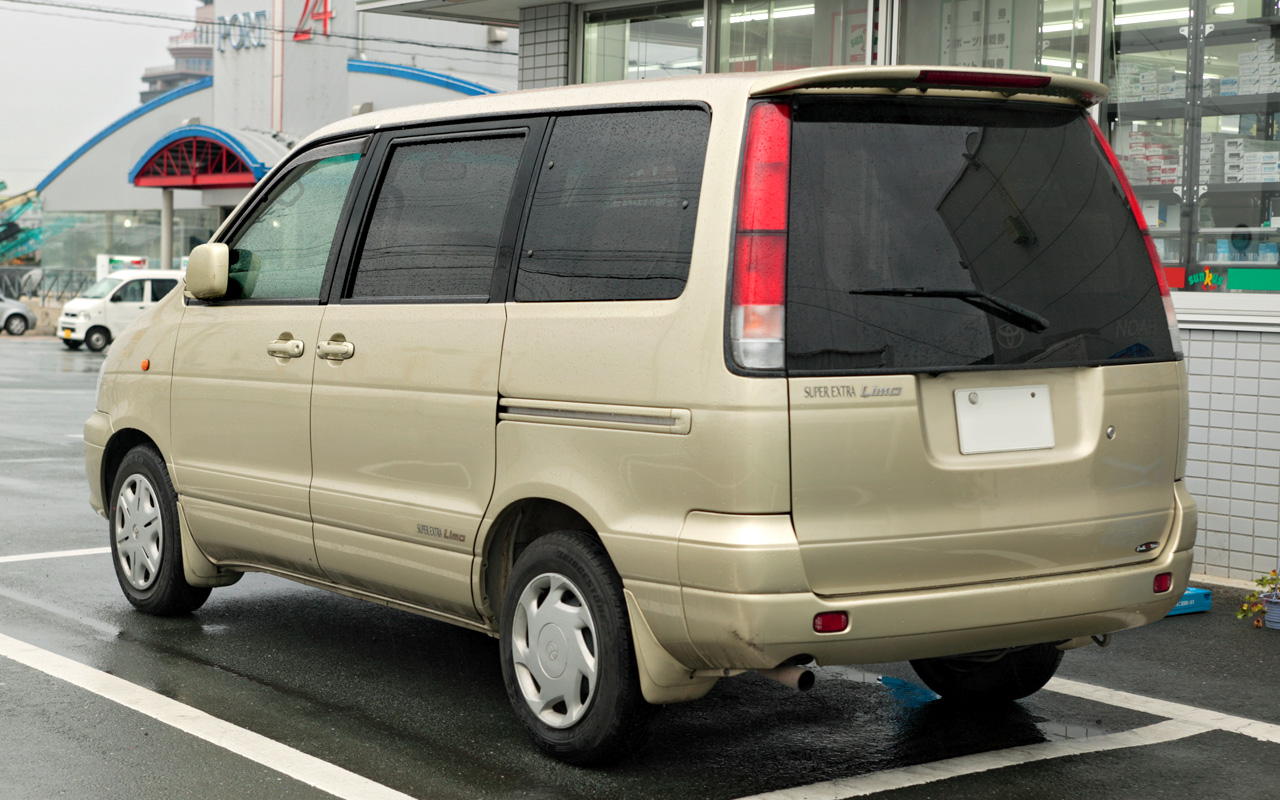
1998–2001 TownAce Noah

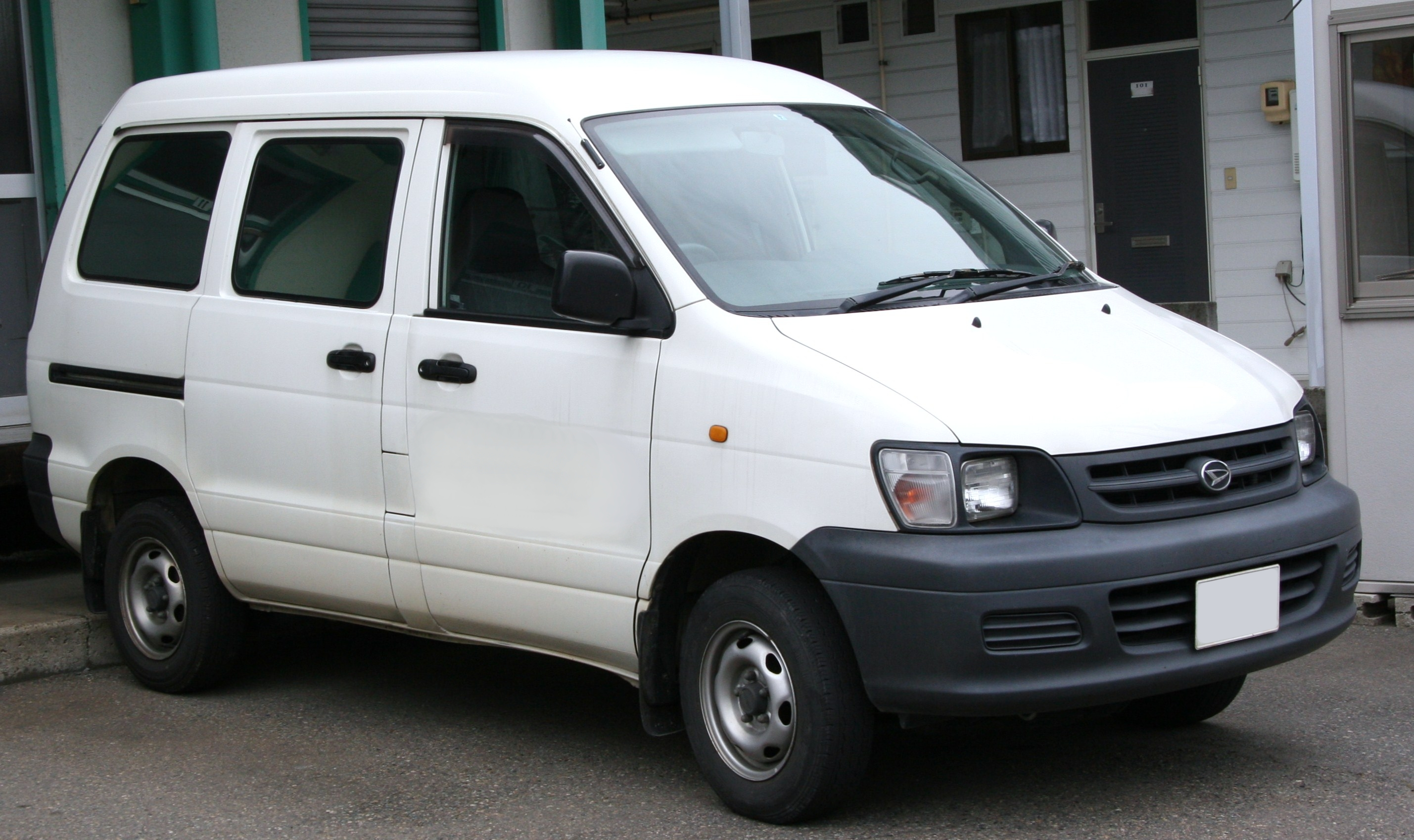
1999–2001 Daihatsu Delta Van

== S-series ==
=== 2008–present (S400) TownAce van/truck, LiteAce van/truck ===
The latest S400 series of LiteAce and TownAce van (S402M/S412M) and truck (S402U/S412U) was released to the market in Japan in February 2008. Now a badge engineered model, the S400 series derived from the Daihatsu Gran Max manufactured in Indonesia. A semi-cab-over-engine body continued, but now with the engine mounted underneath the front seats. The van offers only a standard roof (low roof), and the truck comes with a high deck. Toyota imports models fitted with the 1,495 cc 3SZ-VE engine and five-speed manual or optional four-speed automatic. Rear-wheel drive is standard (S402), with the option of full-time four-wheel drive (S412) arrived in July 2010. The LiteAce badge was discontinued in June 2020 in Japan, as the lineup was consolidated under the TownAce badge.

The TownAce received a facelift in June 2020 with a newer 1,496 cc 2NR-VE engine along with the discontinuation of the "LiteAce" nameplate due to integration of Japanese Toyota dealers. The pickup has also been marketed and produced in Taiwan since November 2021 under the TownAce name, and has also been marketed in the Philippines since July 2022 under the LiteAce name.

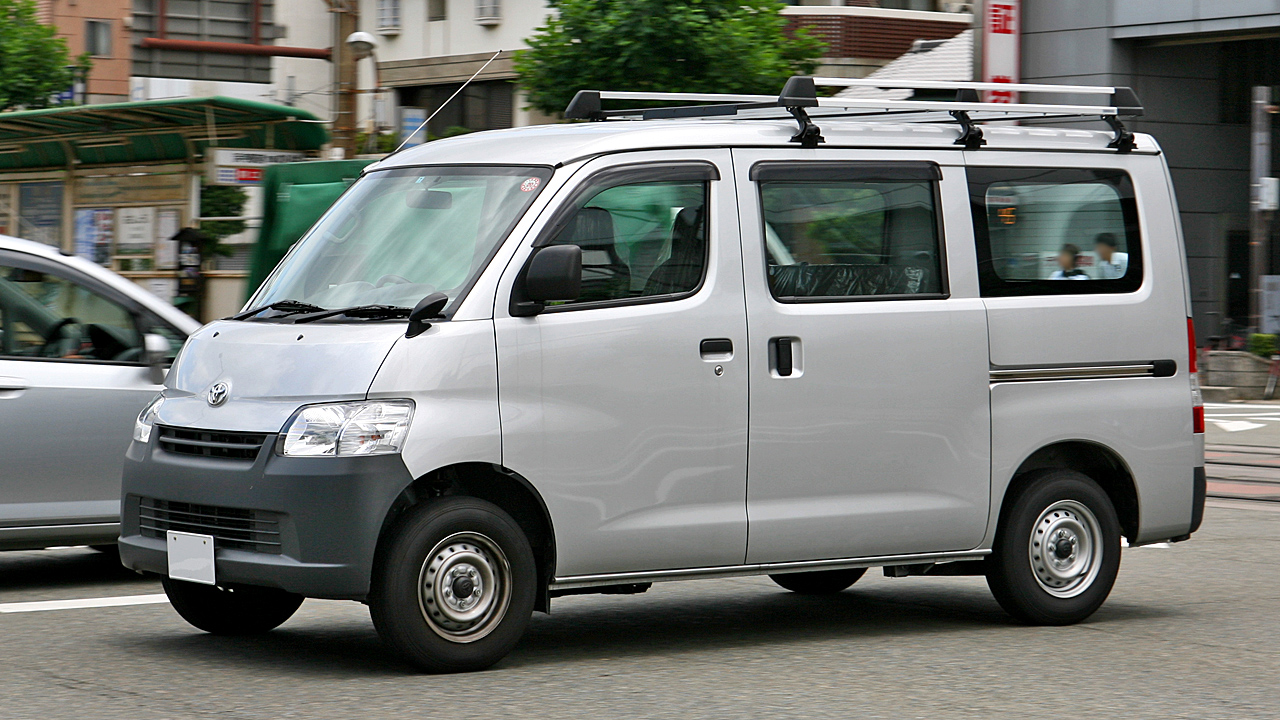
LiteAce DX van (S402M)

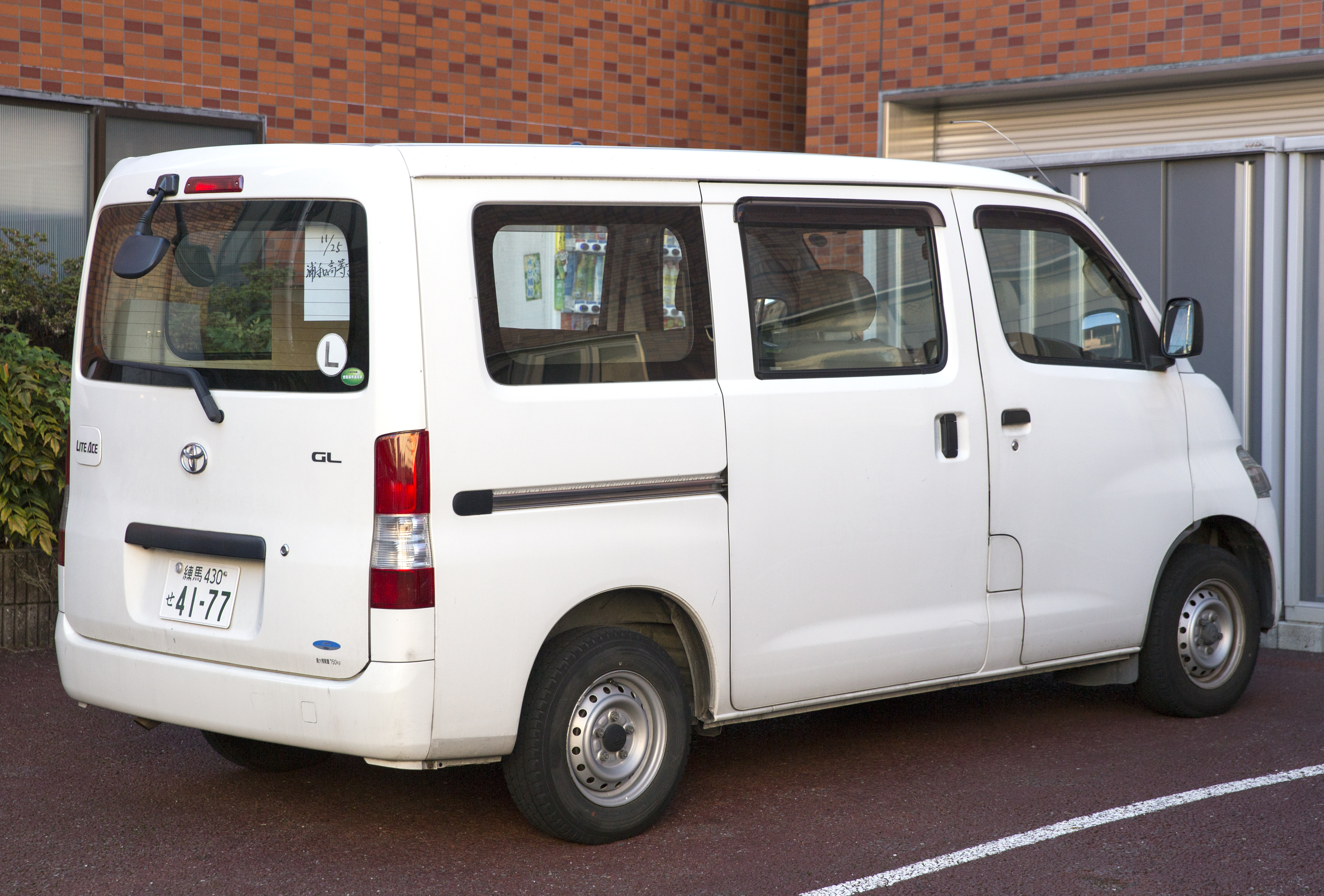
LiteAce GL van (S402M)

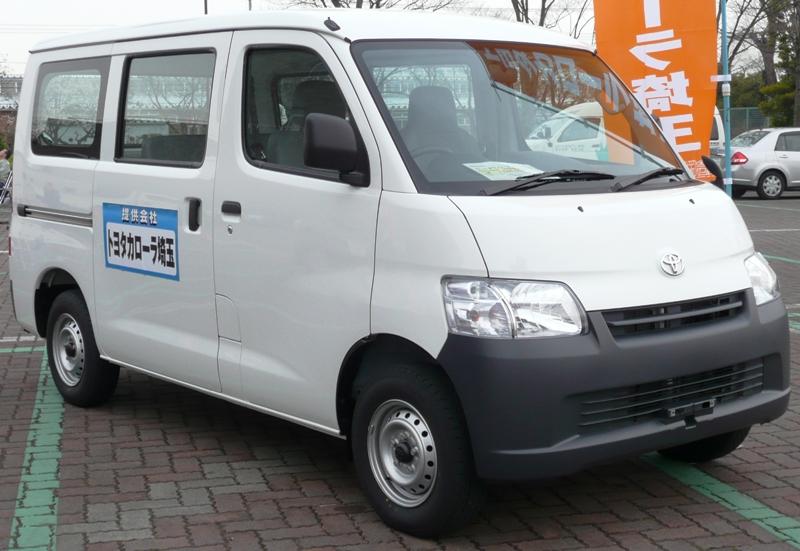
TownAce DX van (S402M, pre-facelift)

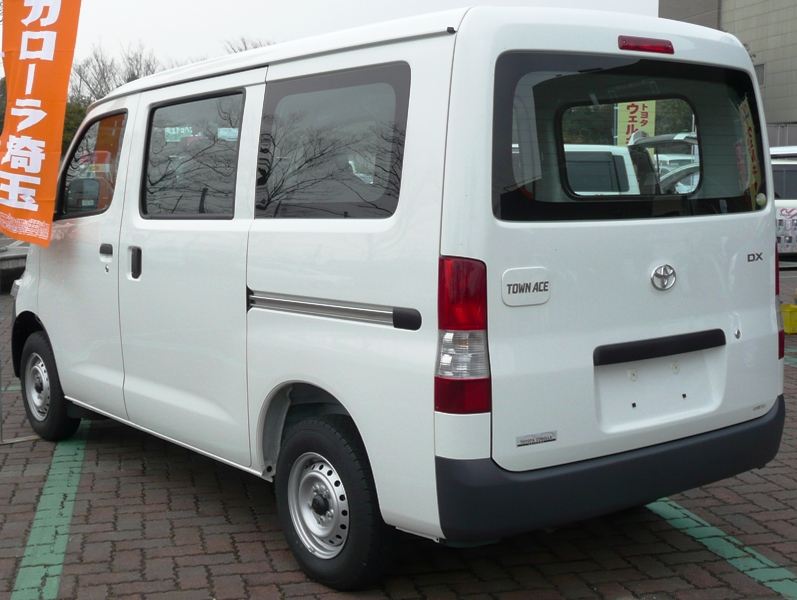
TownAce DX van (S402M, pre-facelift)

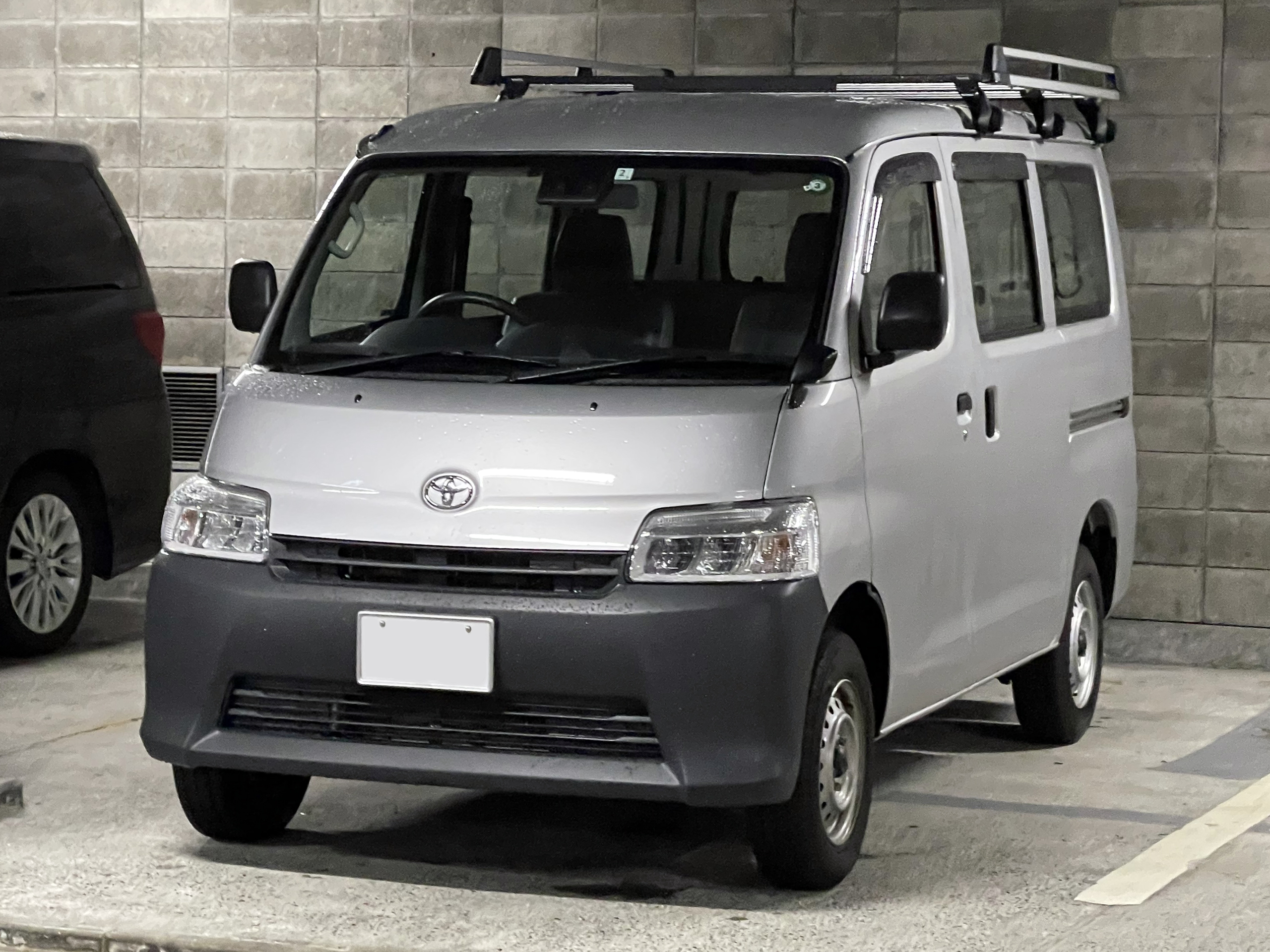
TownAce DX van (S403M, facelift)

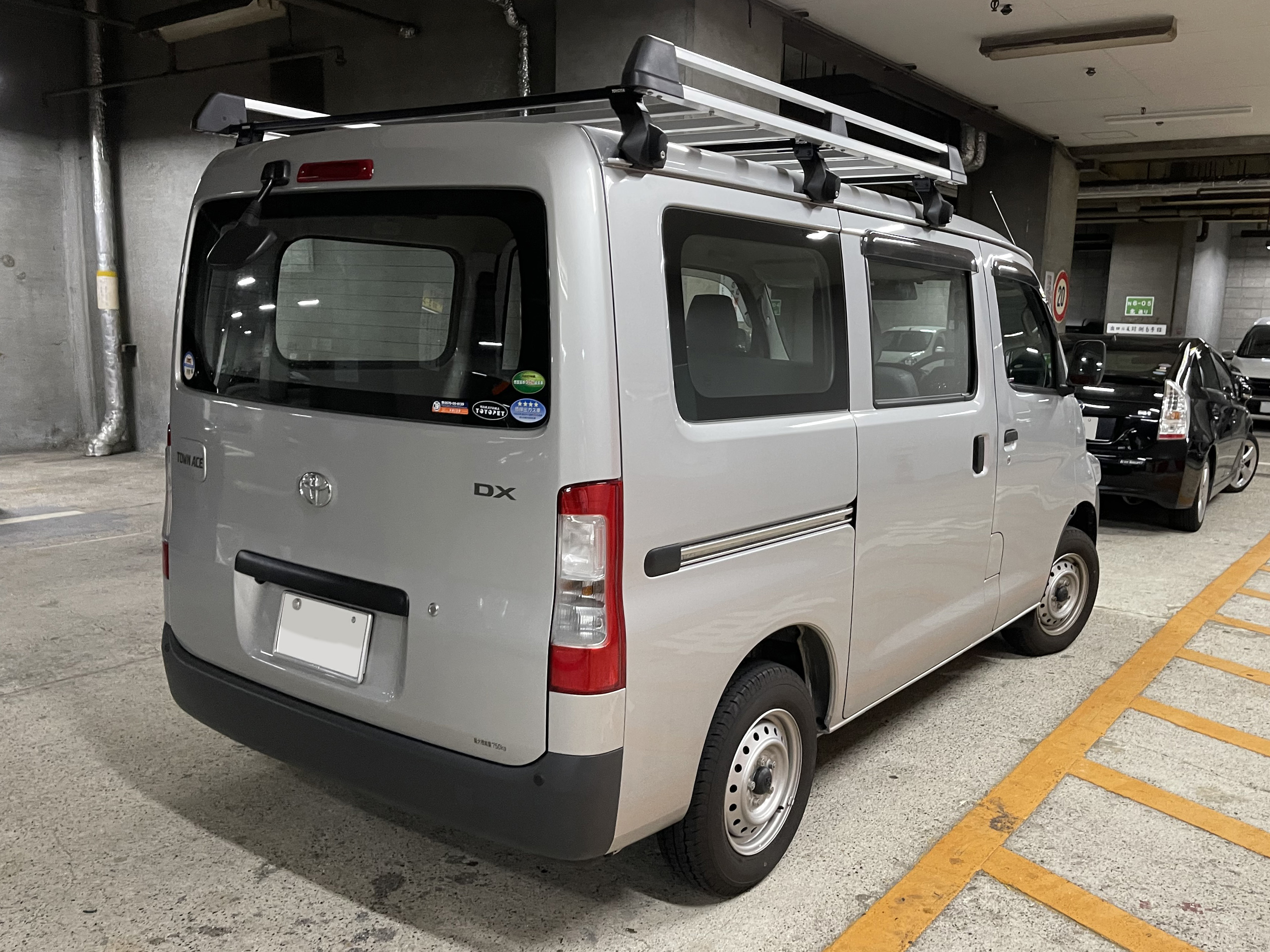
TownAce DX van (S403M, facelift)

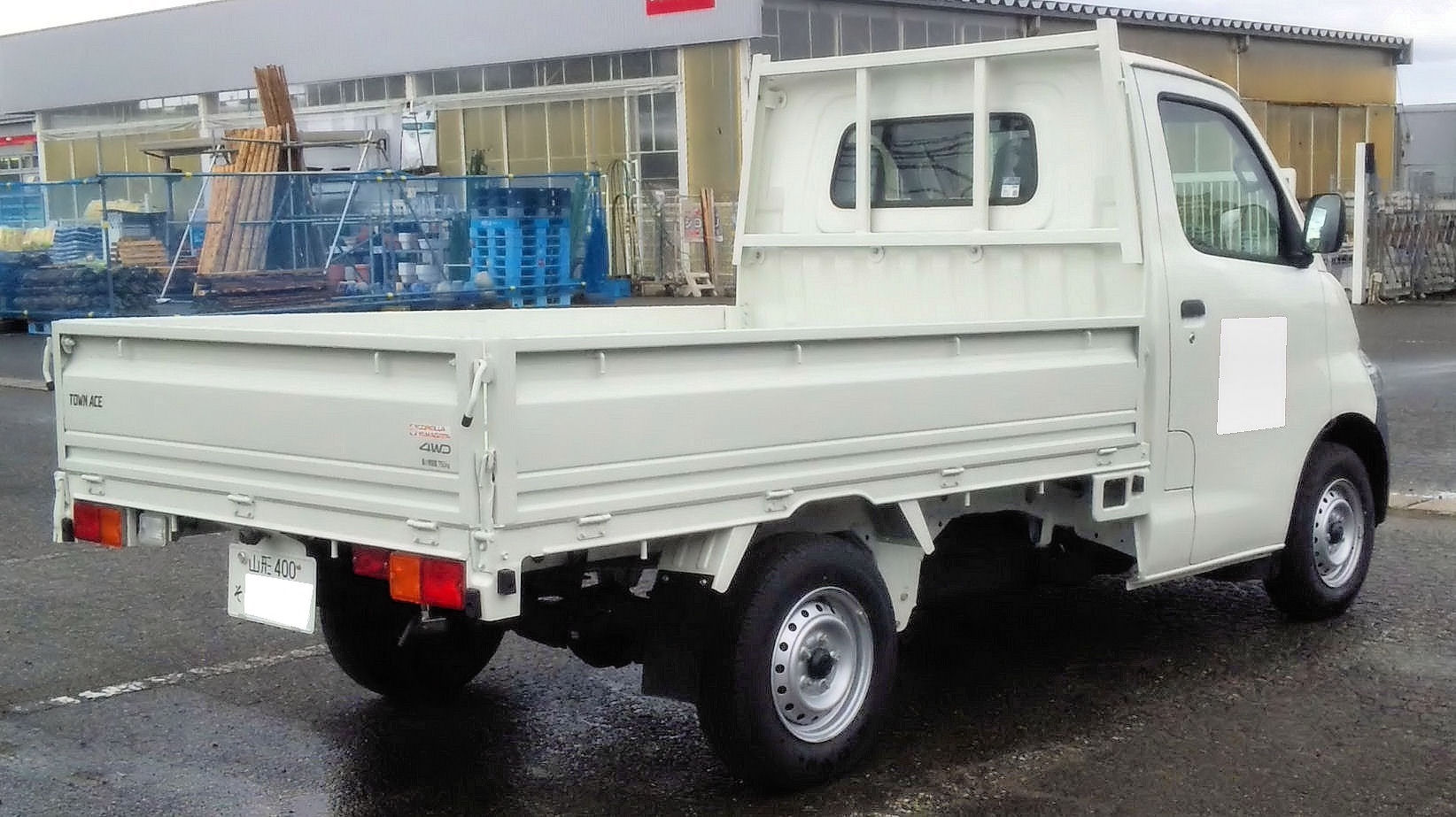
TownAce DX 4WD truck (S412U, pre-facelift)

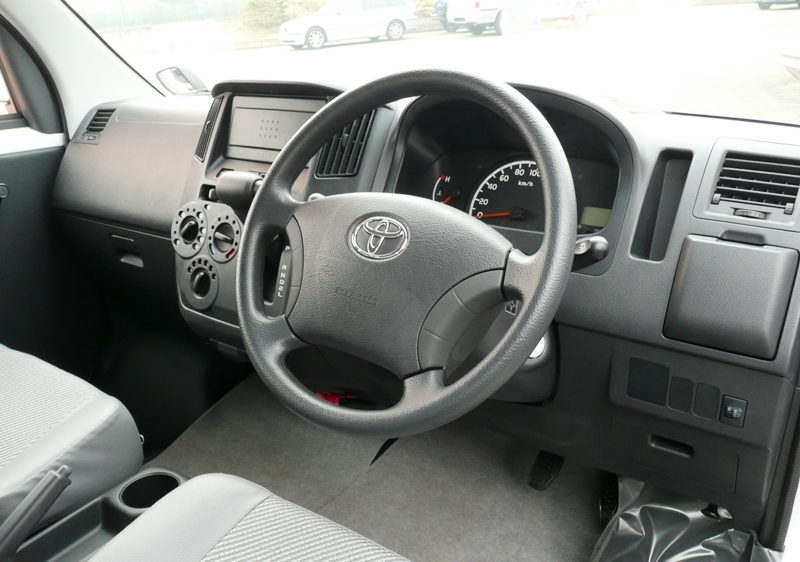
Interior

==== Safety ====
TNCAP (1.0) test result Toyota Town Ace (5-seater, manual) (2025, similar to Euro NCAP 2017)
Test	Points	%
Overall:	0/5 stars	
Adult occupant:	6.064	15%
Child occupant:	30.021	61%
Pedestrian:	21.28	50%
Safety assist:	3	25%

== See also ==
- List of Toyota vehicles
