= Jinbei Granse =

4 door mid-size van

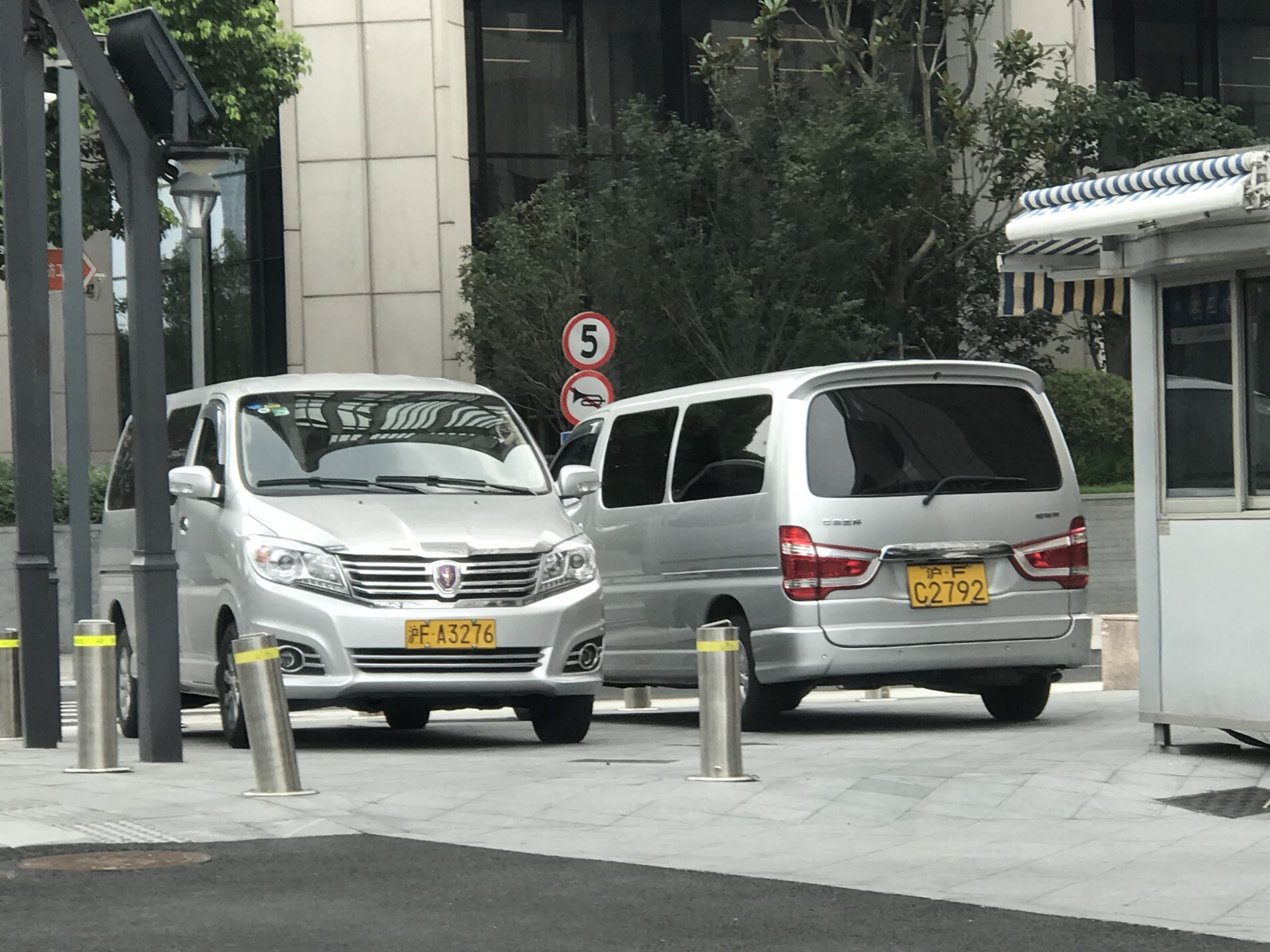

Overview
- Manufacturer: Jinbei
- Also called: Jinbei Grace; Jinbei Kuaiyun (快运); Jinbei Xinkuaiyun (新快运)
- Production: 2002–2020

Body and chassis
- Class: Light commercial vehicle; Mid-size van
- Body style: van, minibus
- Related: Toyota HiAce Granvia; Jinbei Haishiwang (海狮王)

The Jinbei Granse (阁瑞斯 Geruisi) is a 4-door mid-size van produced by Chinese auto maker Jinbei. The Jinbei Haise started out as a licensed rebadged Toyota HiAce with the first Jinbei Haise based on the fourth generation Toyota HiAce Granvia.

== Jinbei Granse (SY6471ES)(2002–2005) ==
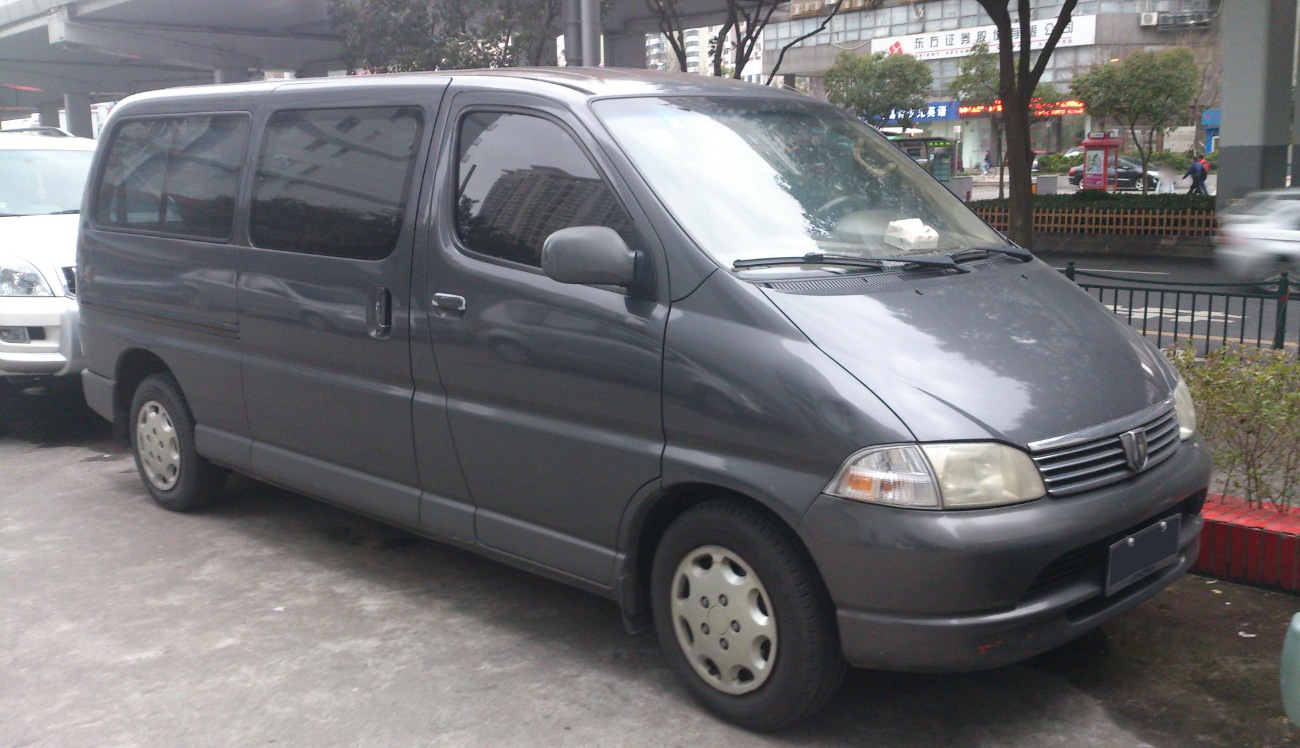
Jinbei Granse LWB

Due to Toyota's agreement with Jinbei, from 2002, the Granvia in China was produced and sold as the Jinbei Granse or Grace in English. Throughout its production run, the Jinbei Grace has had 5 available engines: the 2.0 litre V19 and 2.2-litre V22 from Jinbei, the 2.4 litre 2TZ-FZE, the 2.5 litre DK4A engine and the 2.7 litre 2TR-FE engine. 5 speed manual and 4 speed automatic gearboxes are present on all models.

== Jinbei Granse (SY6470) (2005–2020) ==
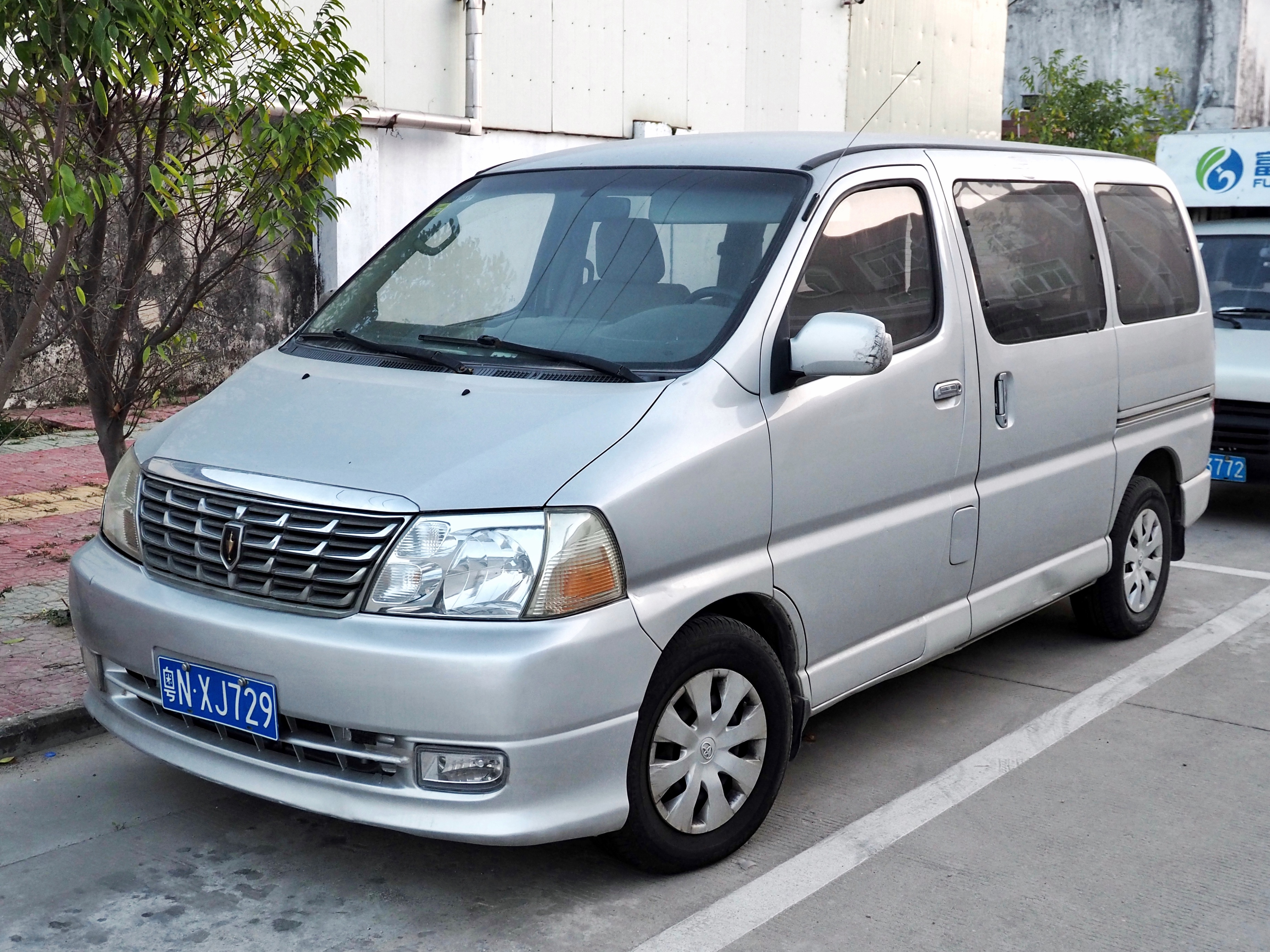
Jinbei Granse first facelift

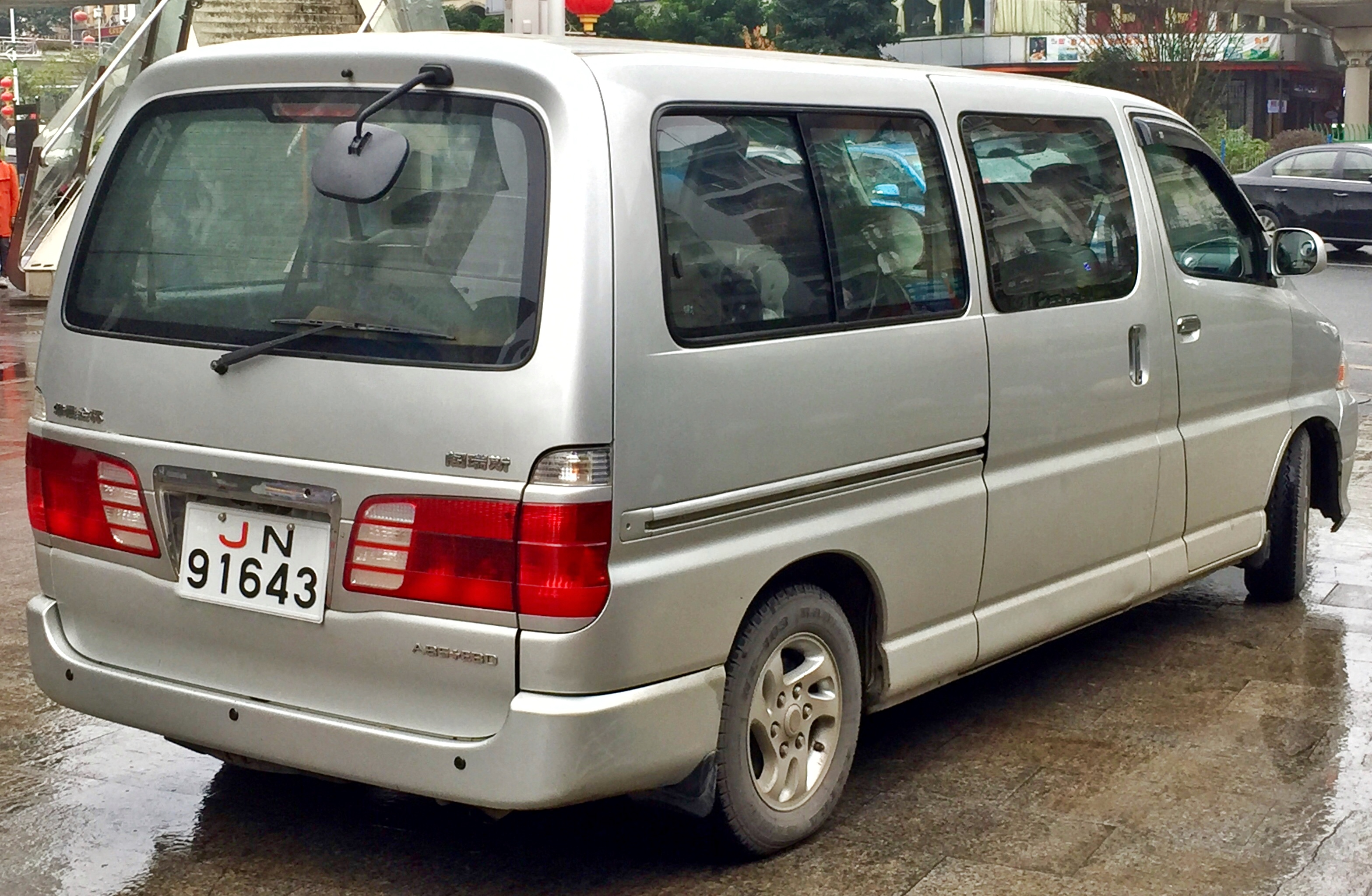
Jinbei Granse first facelift

The first facelift of the Jinbei Granse was aligned with the Toyota HiAce facelift for Japan and Europe, featuring a restyled front end and clear front and rear lamps. Code named SY6470, the first facelift of the Jinbei Granse was sold between 2005 and 2020.

This generation of the Jinbei Granse also spawned a cargo van version called the Jinbei Kuaiyun (快运), and later an updated Jinbei Xinkuaiyun (新快运). Sales continue to last and was sold alongside later versions of the Jinbei Granse.

== Jinbei Granse 3 (2009–2020) ==
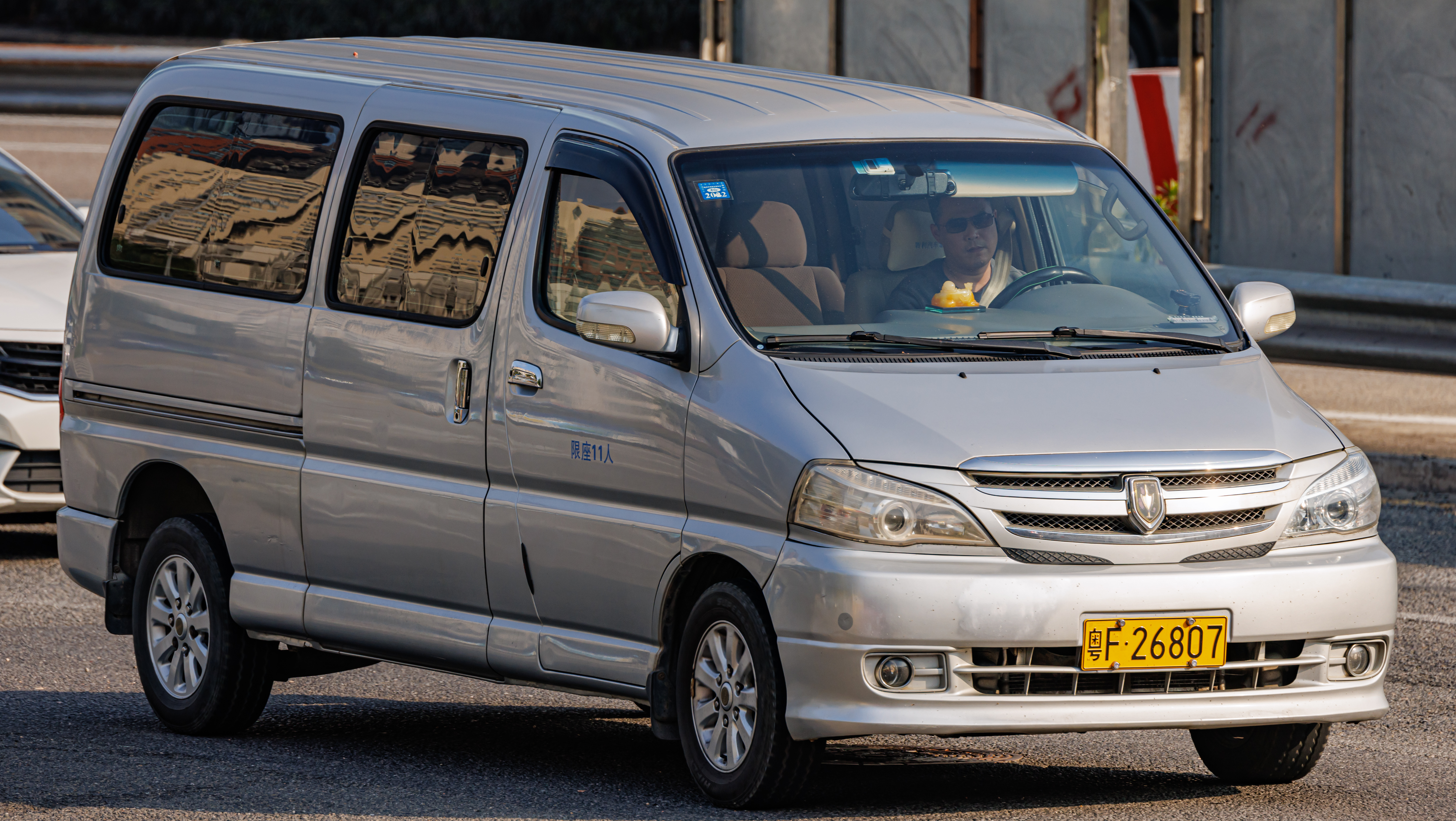
Jinbei Granse second facelift

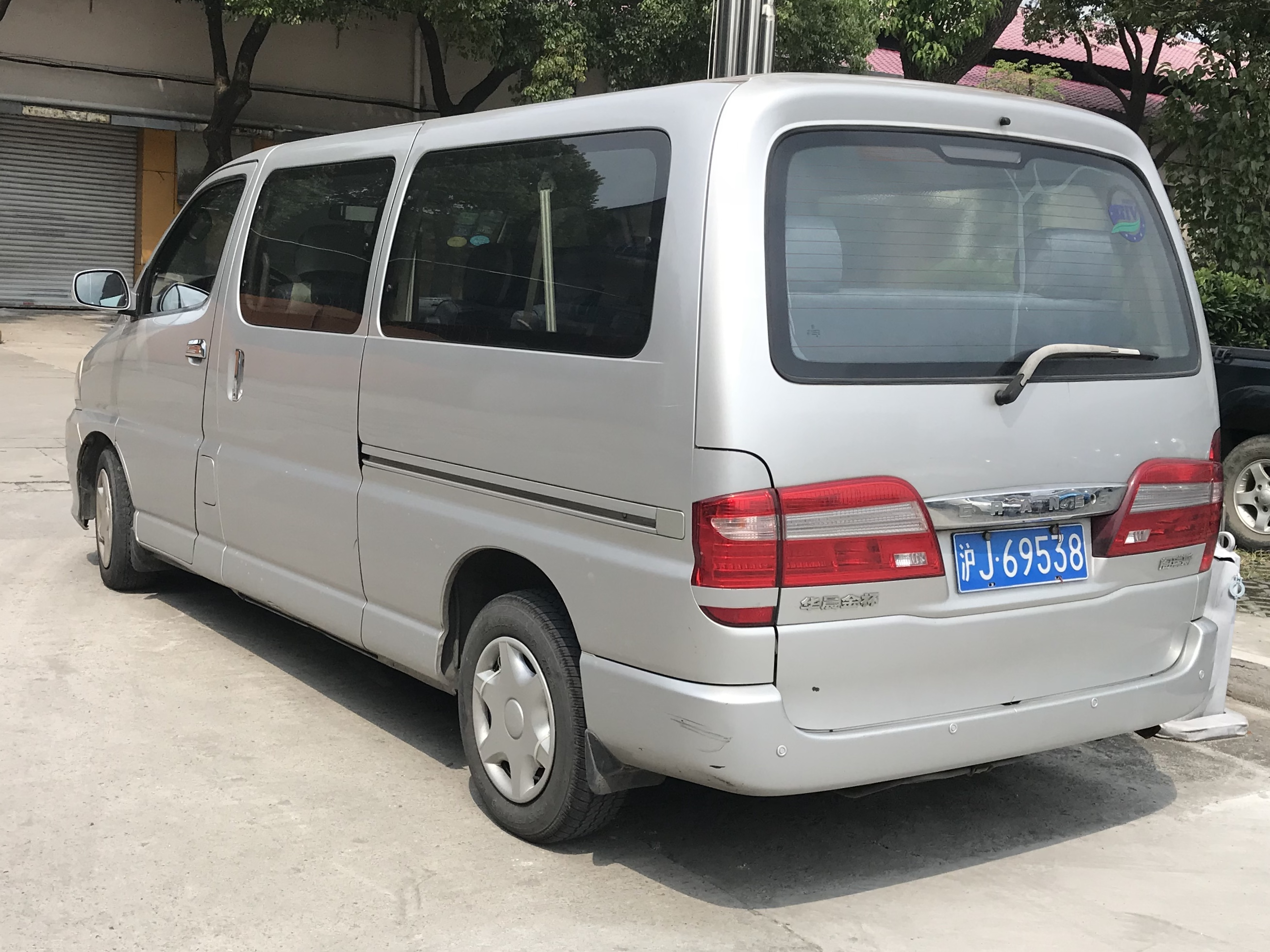
Jinbei Granse second facelift

The second facelift which leads to the third generation Granse was the first generation to be restyled exclusively for the Jinbei brand, which differentiates from the looks of the Toyota model. The front and rear fascia was restyled, and new lamp designs were implemented. Sales started from 2009 and continued to be sold as the Jinbei Granse Kuaiyun alongside the next facelift.

== Jinbei Granse (2014–2020) ==
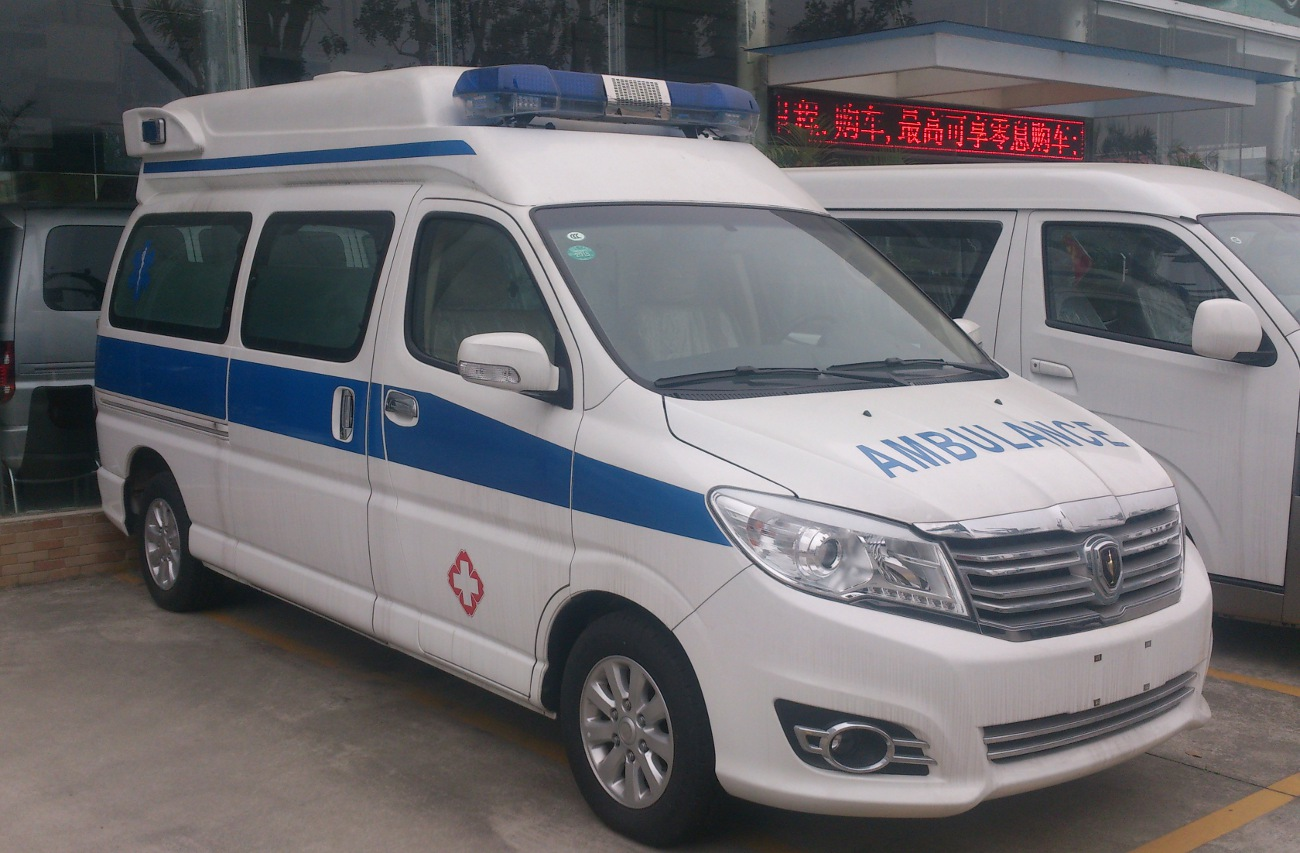
Jinbei Granse LWB facelift III Ambulance

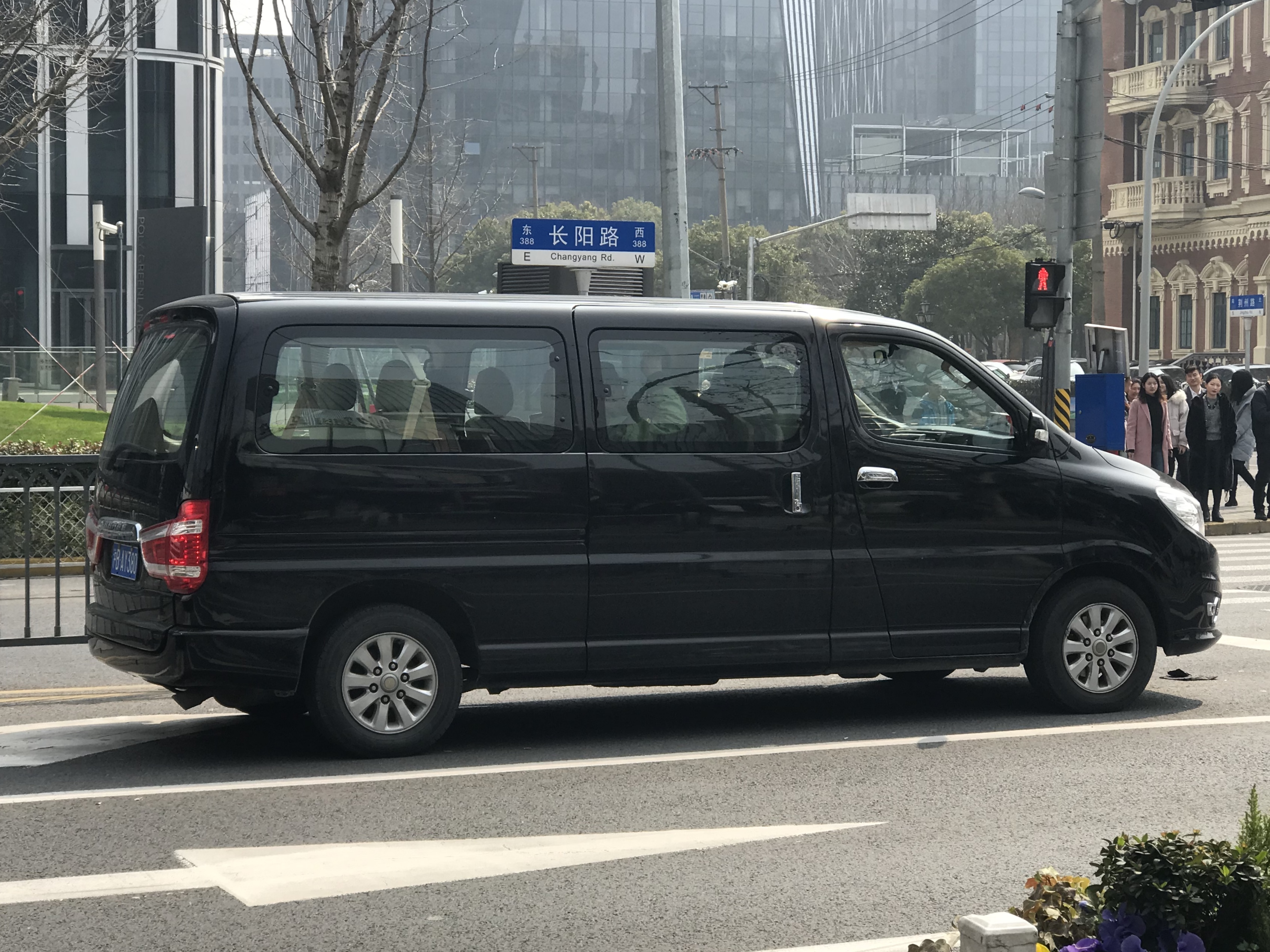
Jinbei Granse LWB facelift III rear

The third facelift was launched in 2014, and features another full make over for the front and rear.

== Successor ==
While production for all Granse models end production, a brand new model, known as the Jinbei Haishiwang or Jinbei Haise King, was unveiled in the same year. This model also shares relations to its predecessors with the exterior styled similarly to the Hiace XH10 and XH20 pre-facelift models. It is available in both low roof and high roof with the standard engine being a 2 litre four cylinder paired to a 6 speed manual transmission as standard. It is available as a 7 seater or 9 seater van.
