= Jinbei Haishiwang =

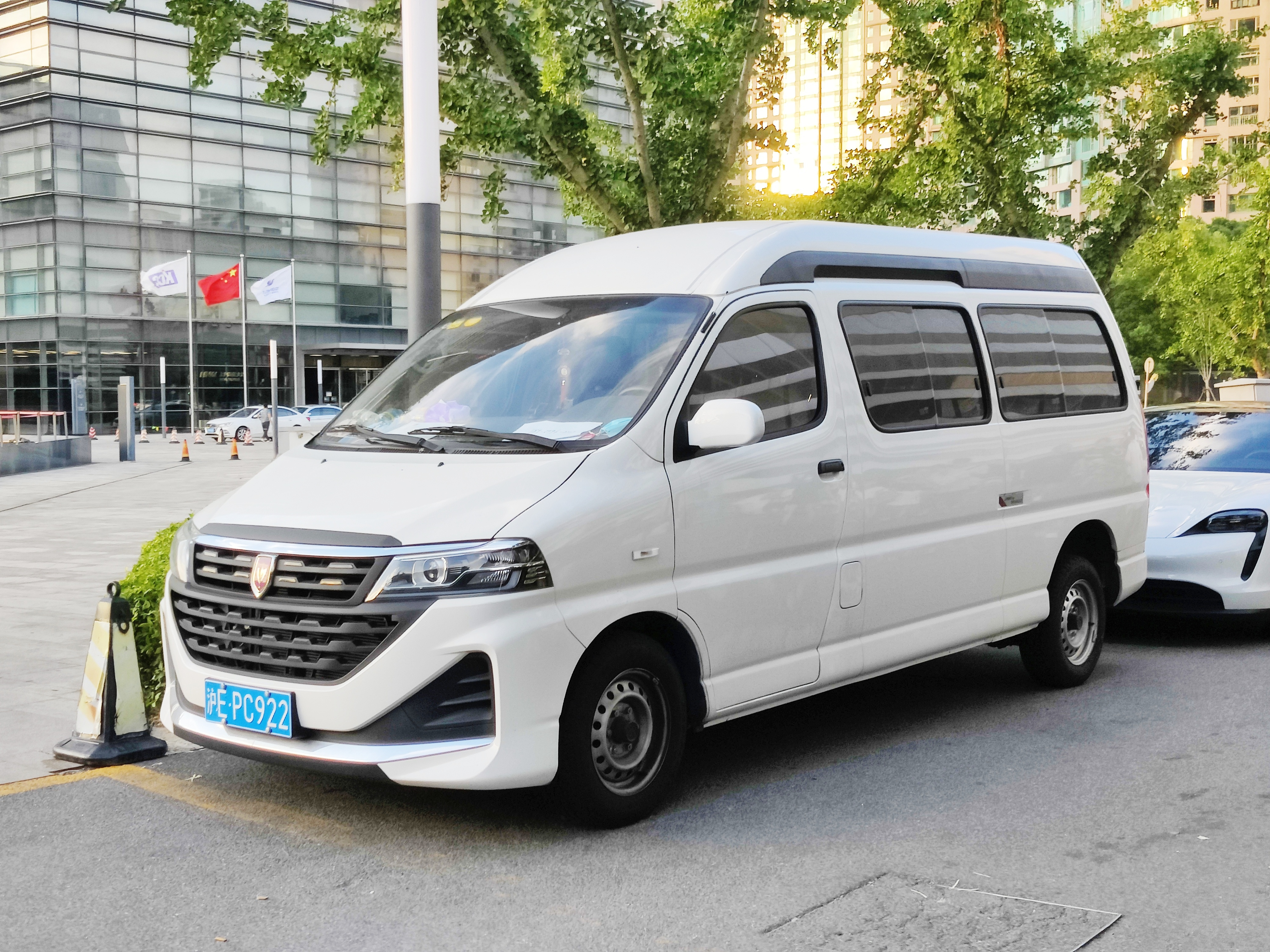

Overview
- Also called: Jinbei Haise King
- Production: 2020 – Present
- Designer: Luciano Bove

Body and chassis
- Body style: 4-door van; 5-door van
- Layout: Front-engine, rear-wheel-drive
- Related: Jinbei Xinkuaiyun/ Jinbei Granse; Toyota Granvia

Powertrain
- Engine: Petrol: 2.0 L 1TZS I4
- Transmission: 6-speed manual

Dimensions
- Wheelbase: 3,430 mm (135.0 in)
- Length: 5,255 mm (206.9 in)
- Width: 1,825 mm (71.9 in)
- Height: 1,980–2,190 mm (78.0–86.2 in)

The Jinbei Haishiwang (海狮王) is a light commercial van (LCV) produced by the Chinese automobile manufacturer Jinbei under the Renault Brilliance Jinbei joint venture. The Haishiwang is built on the same Toyota-licensed platform as the Jinbei Xinkuaiyun and Jinbei Granse while serving as a more upmarket model. The production line and technology was improved via the Renault-Mitsubishi-Nissan Alliance standards and the design was conducted by European designers.

== Overview ==
The Haishiwang is available as a 2- seater, 6- seater, 7/9- seater and 10 seater models, and is offered as both cargo van and passenger van models. Two body styles are available including the 4-door low roof variant and the 5-door high-roof variant, with the 4-door model still retaining the Toyota Granvia derived rear end design, and the 5-door high-roof variant receiving a redesigned rear barn door design.

The more affordable operating version is available in six trim levels, priced from 116,100 yuan to 131,700 yuan. The rear compartment offers optional privacy glass, independent rear air conditioning, dual USB sockets, and multi-directional Adjustable seats with armrests.

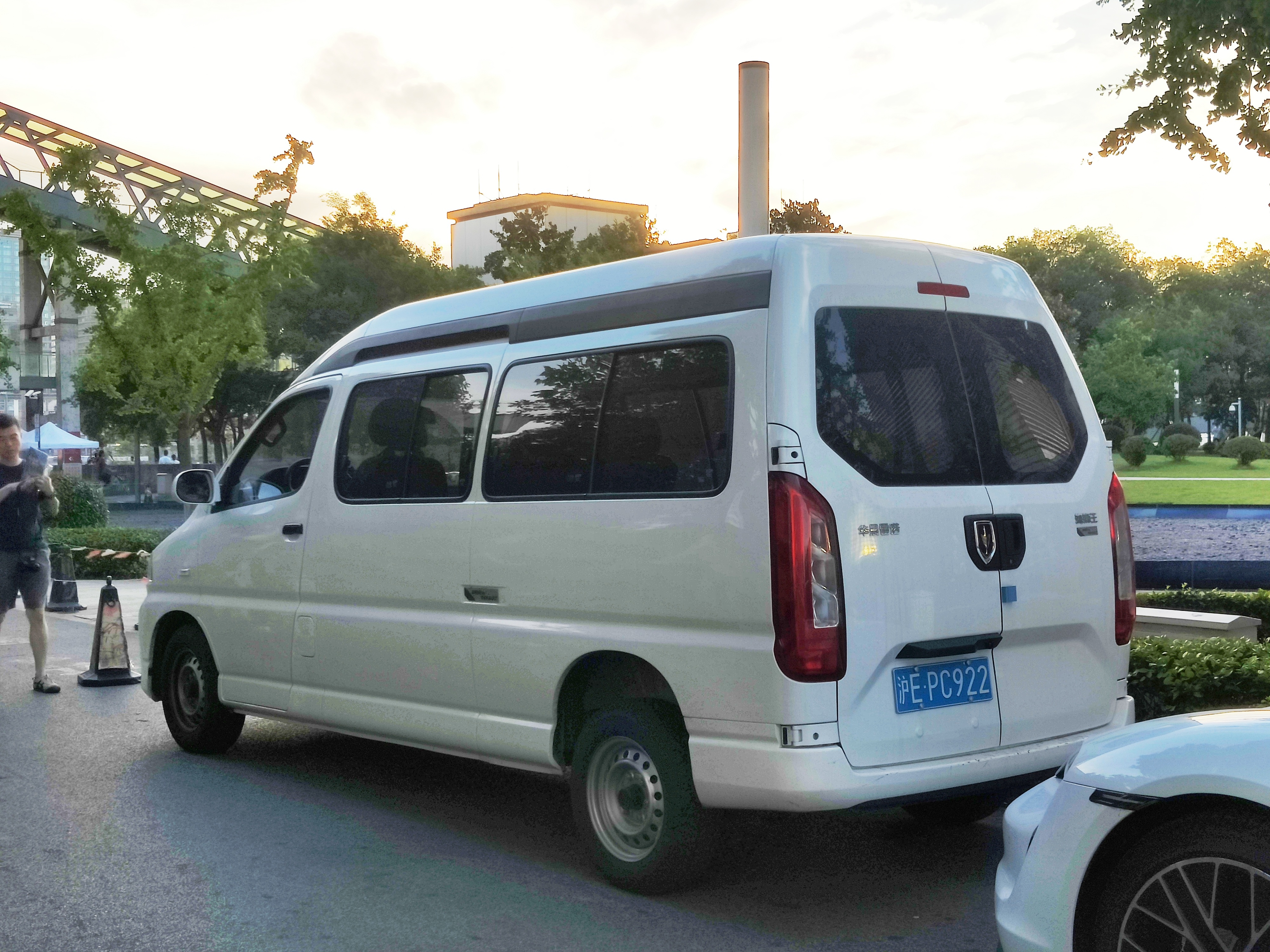
Jinbei Haishiwang high-roof rear view

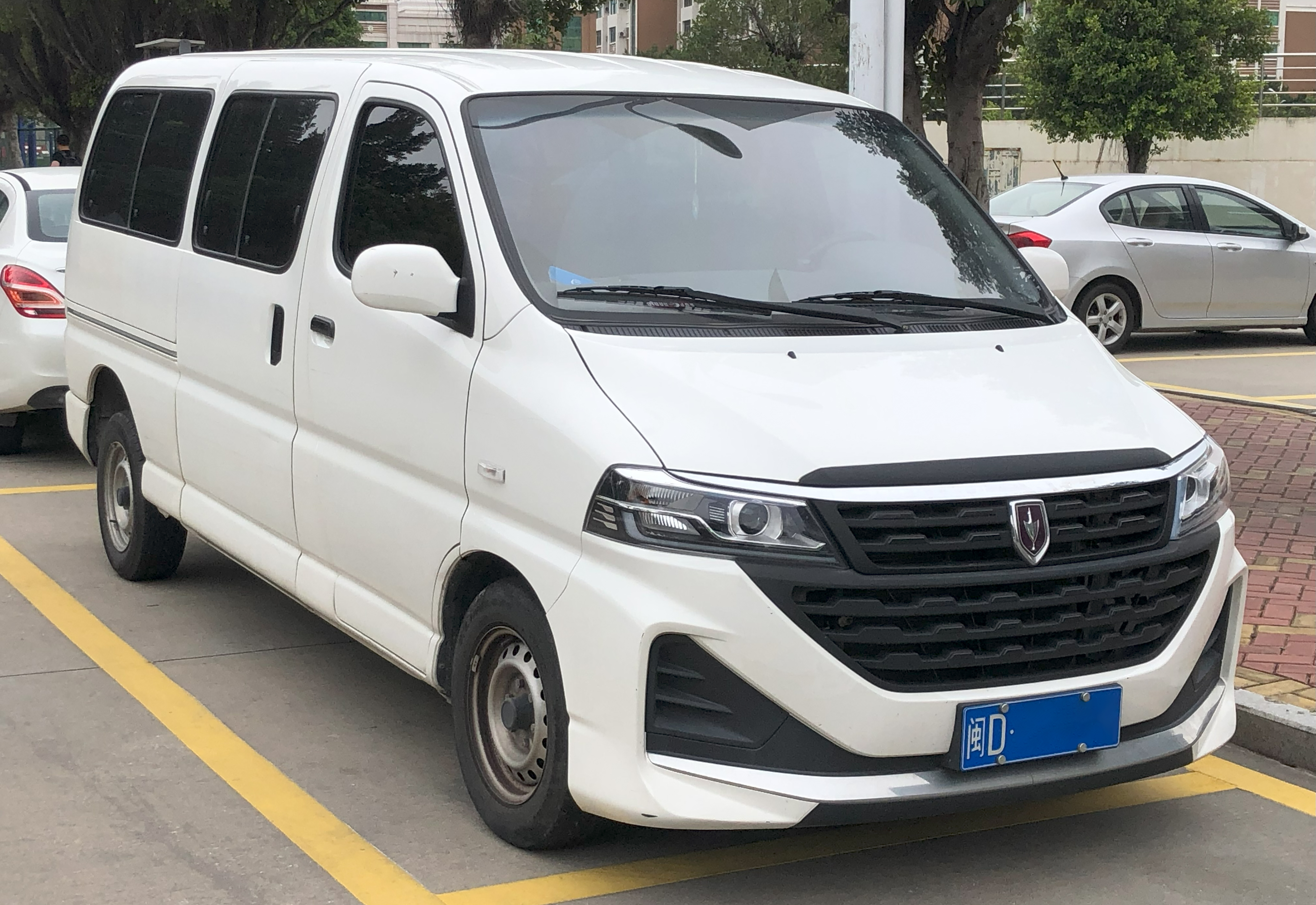
Jinbei Haishiwang low roof

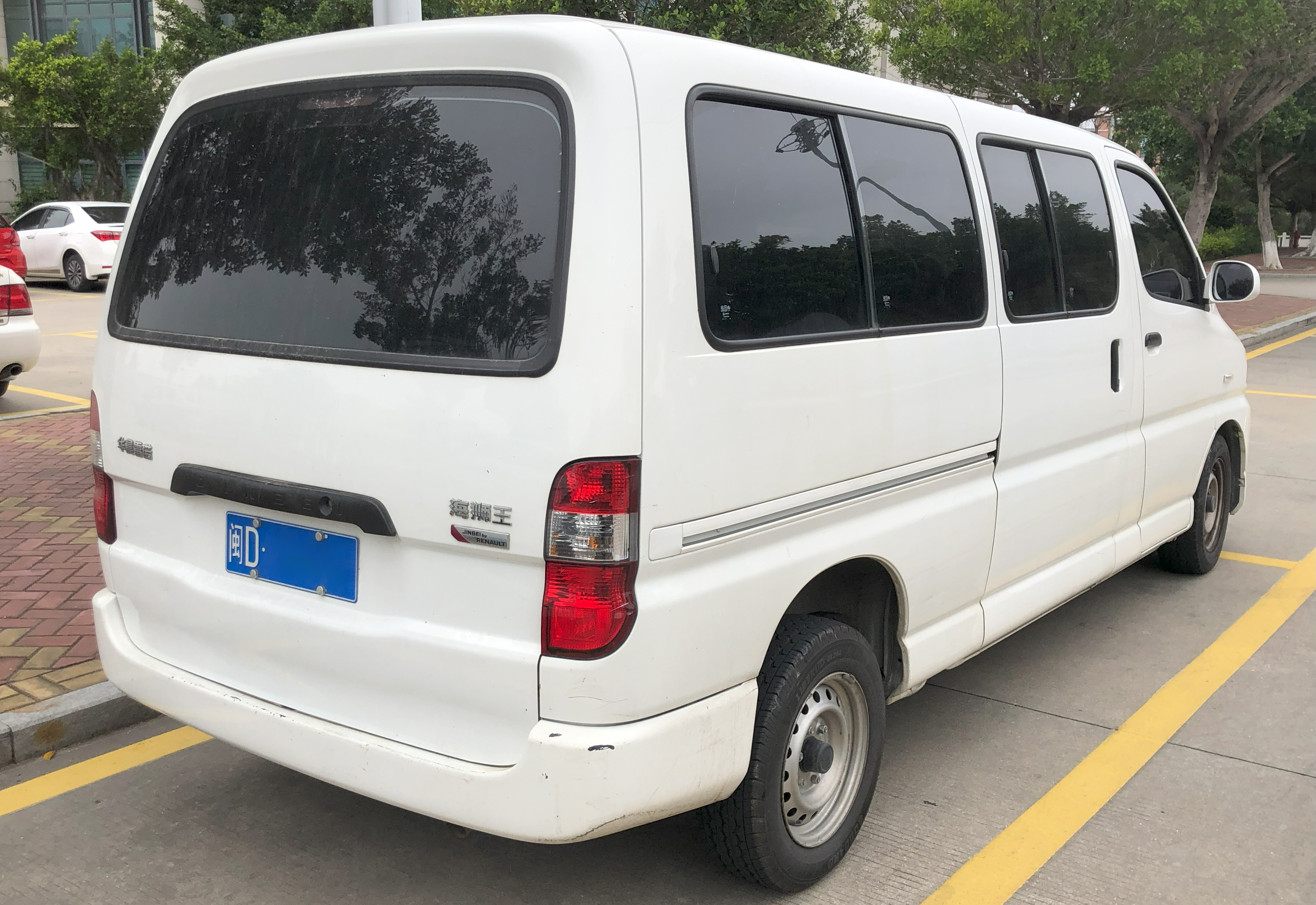
Jinbei Haishiwang low roof rear view

=== Powertrain and Chassis ===
The Haishiwang is powered by the Mianyang Xinchen produced 2.0-liter 1TZS naturally aspirated engine with a maximum power of 100 kilowatts (136hp) and a peak torque of 185 N·m. The transmission part is matched with an Aisin 6-speed manual transmission. The chassis of the operating version of the Haishiwang uses a combination of a front double wishbone torsion bar spring independent suspension and a rear coil spring independent suspension. Some models also use a longitudinal leaf spring rear suspension.
