= Toyota Hilux =

Series of pickup trucks

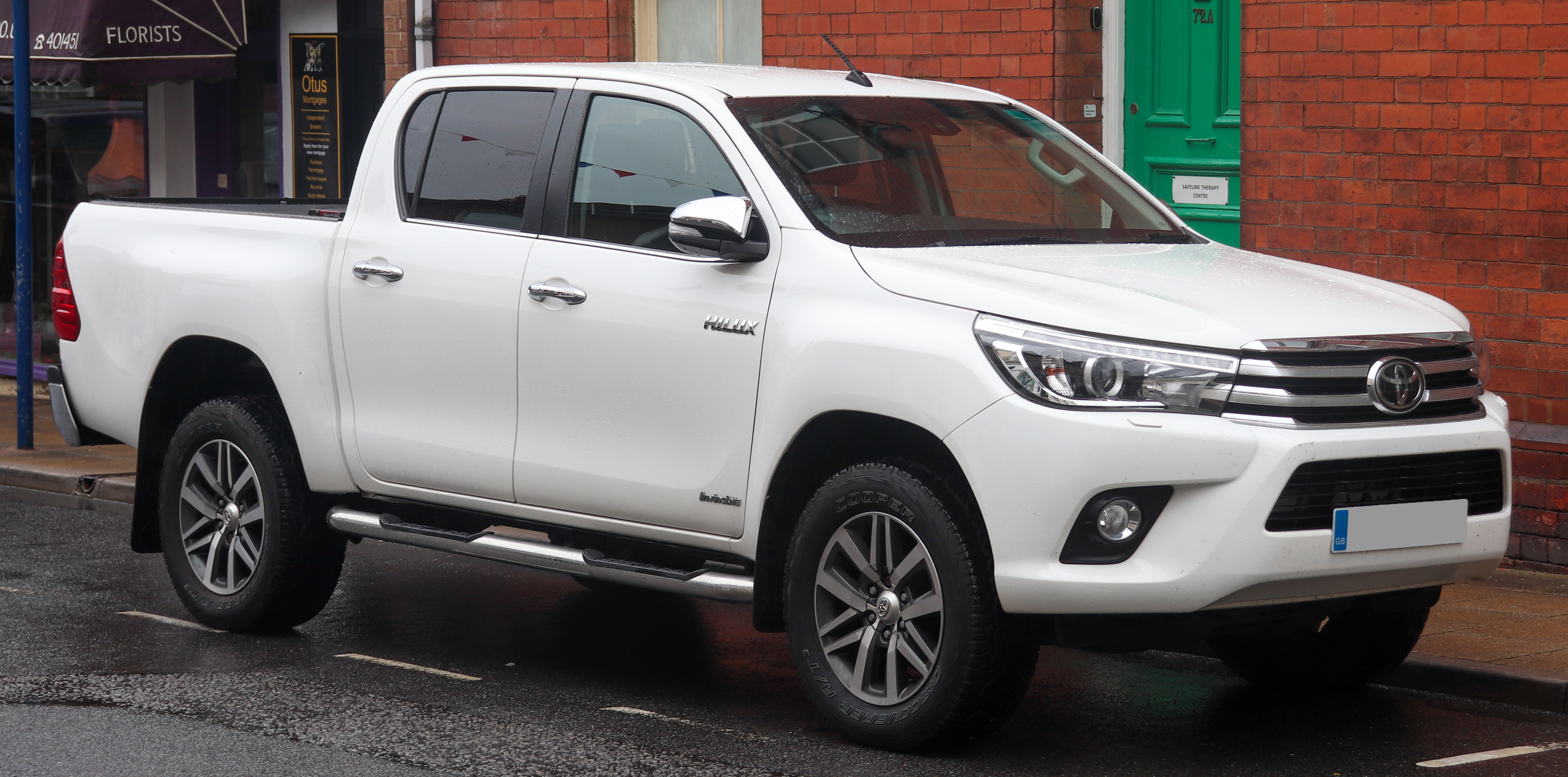
- 2016 Toyota Hilux Invincible (GUN125)

Overview
- Manufacturer: Toyota
- Also called: Toyota Pickup (North America, 1976–1984); Toyota Truck (North America, 1984–1995)
- Production: March 1968 – present

Body and chassis
- Class: Compact pickup truck (1968–2004); Mid-size pickup truck (2004–present)
- Body style: 2-door pickup truck (1968–present); 4-door pickup truck (1981–present)
- Layout: Front-engine, rear-wheel-drive (1968–present); Front-engine, four-wheel-drive (1979–present)
- Chassis: Body-on-frame

Chronology
- Predecessor: Toyota Briska; Toyota Lite Stout; Toyota Stout
- Successor: Toyota Tacoma (North America, from 1995); Toyota Fortuner (Hilux Sport Rider)

The Toyota Hilux (/ˈhaɪ.lʌks/; Japanese: トヨタ・ハイラックス, romanized: Toyota Hairakkusu), stylised as HiLux and historically as Hi-Lux, is a series of pickup trucks produced and marketed by the Japanese automobile manufacturer Toyota. The majority of these vehicles are sold as a pickup truck or cab chassis, although they could be configured in a variety of body styles.

According to Toyota, the "Hilux" name is a portmanteau of the words "High Luxury"; this name means "comfortable vehicle with high technology". It was considered a luxury vehicle only when compared to the spartan, heavy-duty Stout. This was due to its additional sedan-like equipment, similar to those found in the Crown, Corona, and Corona Mark II coupé utilities available until the early 1970s.

The pickup truck was sold with the Hilux name in most markets, but in North America, the Hilux name was retired starting in the 1976 model year in favor of Pickup, and later as Truck in the 1984 model year. In this market, the popular option package, the SR5 (Sport Runabout 5-Speed), was colloquially used as a model name for the truck, even though the option package was also used on other Toyota models, like the 1972 to 1979 Corolla. In 1984, the Trekker, the station wagon version of the Hilux, was renamed the 4Runner in Americas, Australia, and the Middle East, and the Hilux Surf in Japan. In 1992, Toyota introduced a newer pickup model, the mid-size T100 in North America, and the Grandlux in the Middle East, necessitating distinct names for each vehicle other than Truck. Since 1995, the 4Runner is a standalone SUV, while in the same year Toyota introduced the Tacoma to replace the Hilux in North America while the latter remains in the market in the rest of the world.

Since the seventh-generation model released in 2004, the Hilux shares the same ladder frame chassis platform called the IMV with the Fortuner SUV and the Innova MPV. Cumulative global sales in 2017 reached 17.7 million units.

== First generation (N10; 1968) ==
First generation
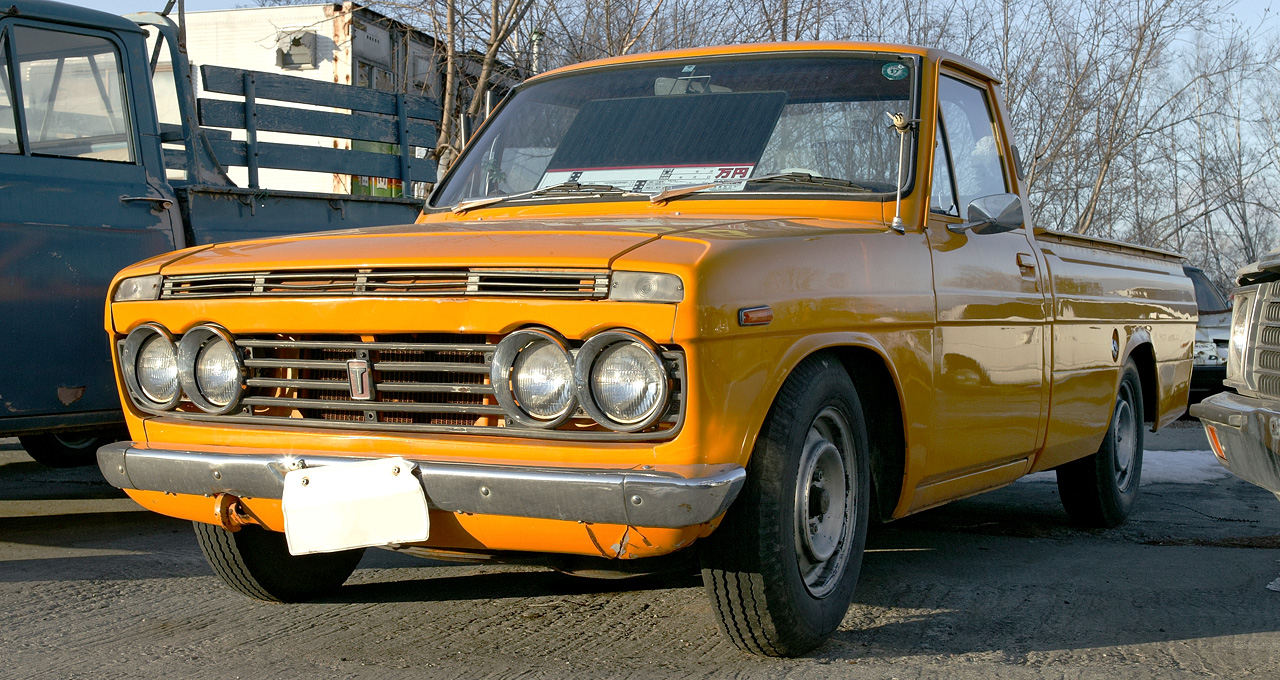
- 1968–1970 Toyota Hilux long bed (RN15)

Overview
- Model code: N10
- Production: March 1968 – April 1972
- Assembly: Japan: Hamura, Tokyo (Hino); United States: Long Beach, California (Atlas Fabricators, final assembly: 1971–1972); South Africa: Durban (Motor Assemblies Ltd.: from 1969); Uruguay: Montevideo (Ayax S.A., from 1971)
- Designer: Takayuki Otsuka

Body and chassis
- Body style: 2-door pickup truck
- Layout: Front-engine, rear-wheel-drive

Powertrain
- Engine: Petrol: 1.5 L 2R I4 (RN10/15); 1.6 L 12R I4 (RN13/16); 1.9 L 3R I4 (RN11); 1.9 L 8R I4 (RN12); 2.0 L 18R I4 (RN14)
- Transmission: 4-speed manual

Dimensions
- Wheelbase: 4,215 mm (165.9 in) (SWB); 2,785 mm (109.6 in) (LWB)
- Length: 4,215 mm (165.9 in) (SWB truck); 4,360 mm (171.7 in) (LWB chassis cab); 4,610 mm (181.5 in) (LWB truck); 4,665 mm (183.7 in) (box van)
- Width: 1,580 mm (62.2 in)
- Height: 1,575 mm (62.0 in); 1,830 mm (72.0 in) (box van)
- Curb weight: 940 kg (2,072 lb) (LWB chassis cab); 1,025–1,040 kg (2,260–2,293 lb) (SWB truck); 1,075–1,085 kg (2,370–2,392 lb) (LWB truck); 1,075–1,110–1,255 kg (2,370–2,447–2,767 lb) (box van)

The Hilux started production in March 1968 as the RN10 in short-wheelbase form with a 1.5 L inline-four engine, generating a maximum power output of 77 PS (57 kW; 76 hp) in Japanese market specification. The vehicle was conceived by Toyota, and was developed and manufactured by Hino Motors at its Hamura Plant. In Japan, it was available at the Toyota Japan dealership retail chains called Toyota Store and Toyopet Store. The modification to the engine was enough for a claimed top speed of 130 km/h (81 mph). The 1.5-litre engine was upgraded to a 1.6-litre inline-four in February 1971.

In April 1969, a long-wheelbase version was added to the range, followed by box van models in July 1970. The short-wheelbase version also continued in production for many more years. The long-wheelbase version was not sold in the North American market until 1972, allowing the Datsun Truck to maintain a strong market presence.

The Hilux was engineered and assembled by Hino Motors to replace the earlier vehicle that the Hilux was derived from, called the Briska in the niche beneath the larger and older Stout – it replaced the Stout fully in some markets. For the North American market, the only body style was a regular cab with a short bed. It used a typical truck setup of A-arms and coil springs in front and a live axle with leaf springs in back. A four-speed manual transmission was standard.

Starting in November 1971, final assembly of trucks for the United States market was completed by Atlas Fabricators in Long Beach, California, later renamed Toyota Auto Body California. Trucks were shipped from the factory in Japan as a cab chassis (the entire truck, less the truck bed). When the trucks arrived in the United States, a truck bed would be locally built and attached to the chassis before being sent to dealers. The arrangement was a form of tariff engineering, allowing Toyota to circumvent the chicken tax, a 25 percent tariff on imported light trucks. By only importing a chassis cab, Toyota only had to pay a 4% tariff.

=== Engines ===
Global markets:

- 1968–1971: 1.5 L (1,490 cc) 2R OHV I4, 70–77 PS (51–57 kW; 69–76 hp)
- 1971–1972: 1.6 L (1,587 cc) 12R OHV I4, 83–91 PS (61–67 kW; 82–90 hp)

North American markets:

- 1969: 1.9 L (1,897 cc) 3R OHV I4, 85 hp (63 kW; 86 PS)
- 1970–1972: 1.9 L (1,858 cc) 8R SOHC I4, 97 hp (72 kW; 98 PS)
- 1972: 2.0 L (1,968 cc) 18R SOHC I4, 108 hp (81 kW; 109 PS)
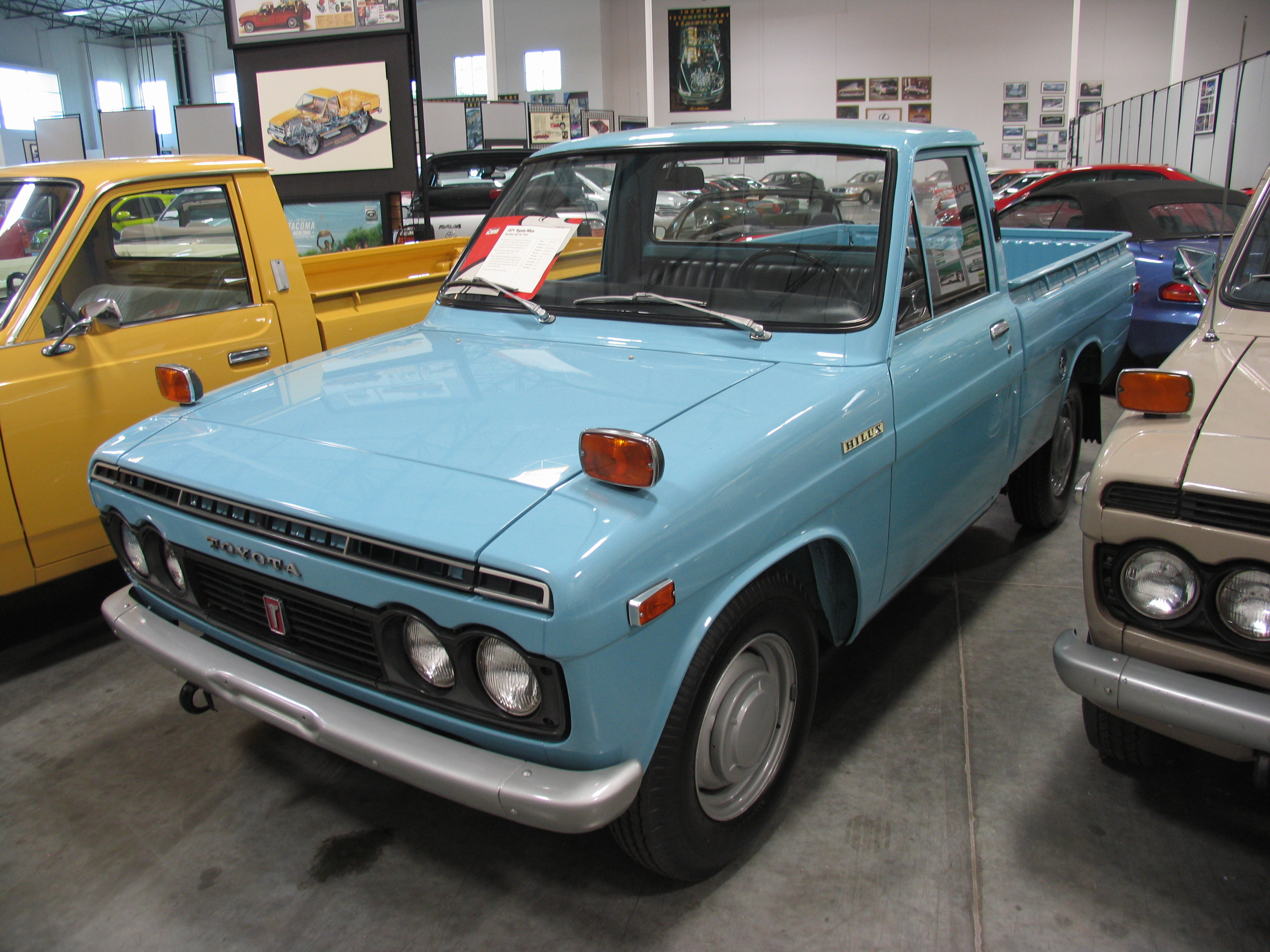
1970–1972 Toyota Hilux

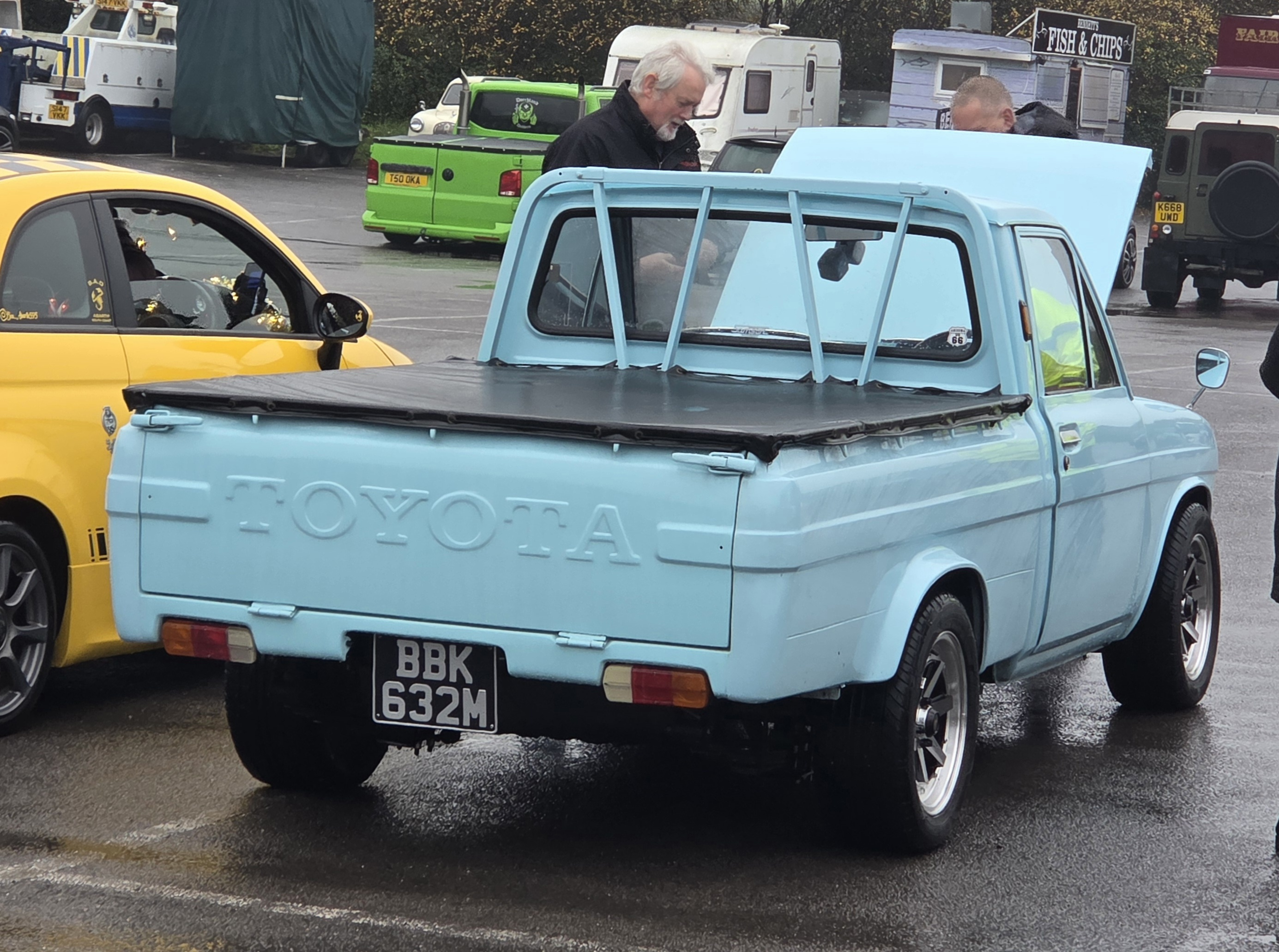
Rear view

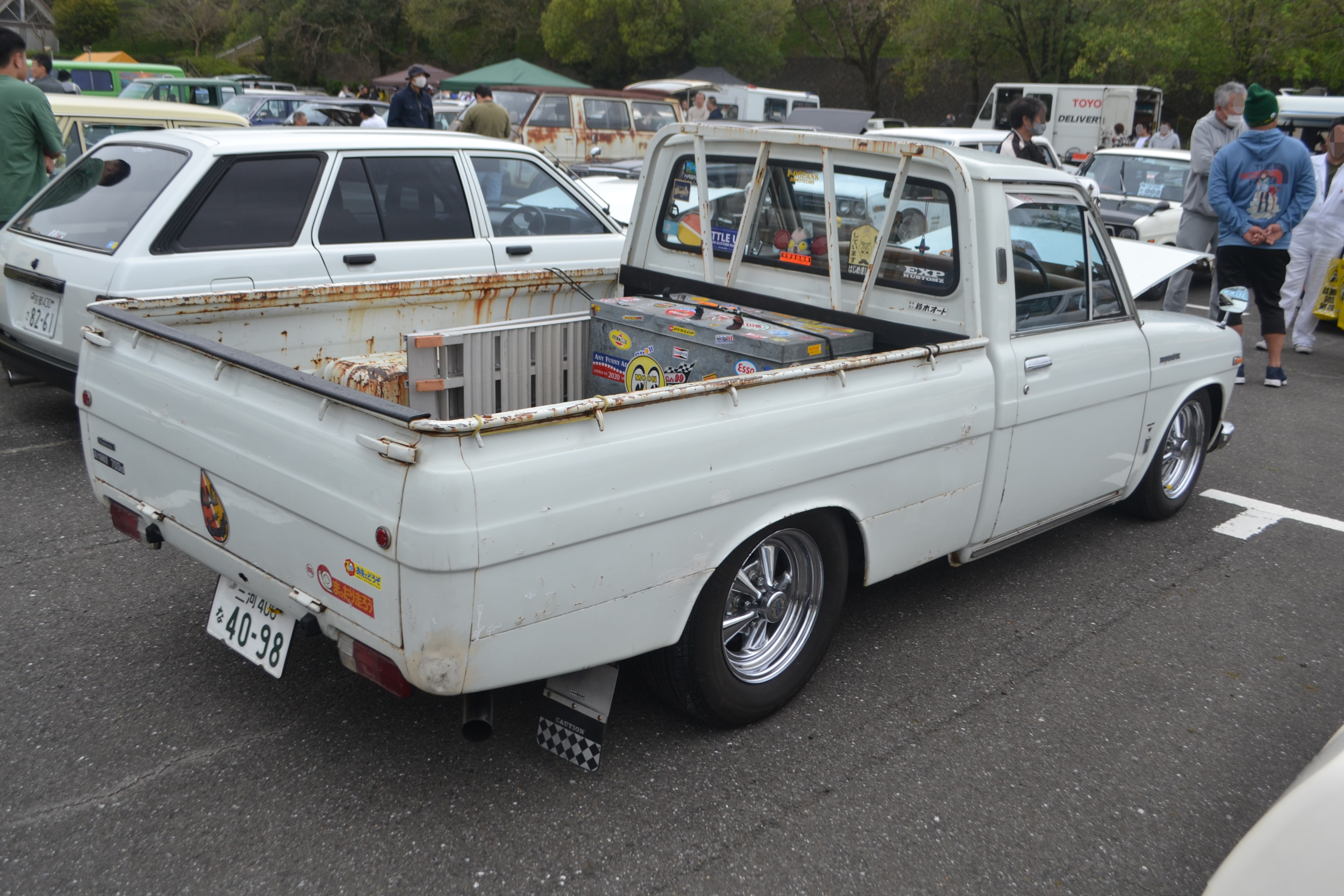
LWB model

== Second generation (N20; 1972) ==
Second generation (N20)
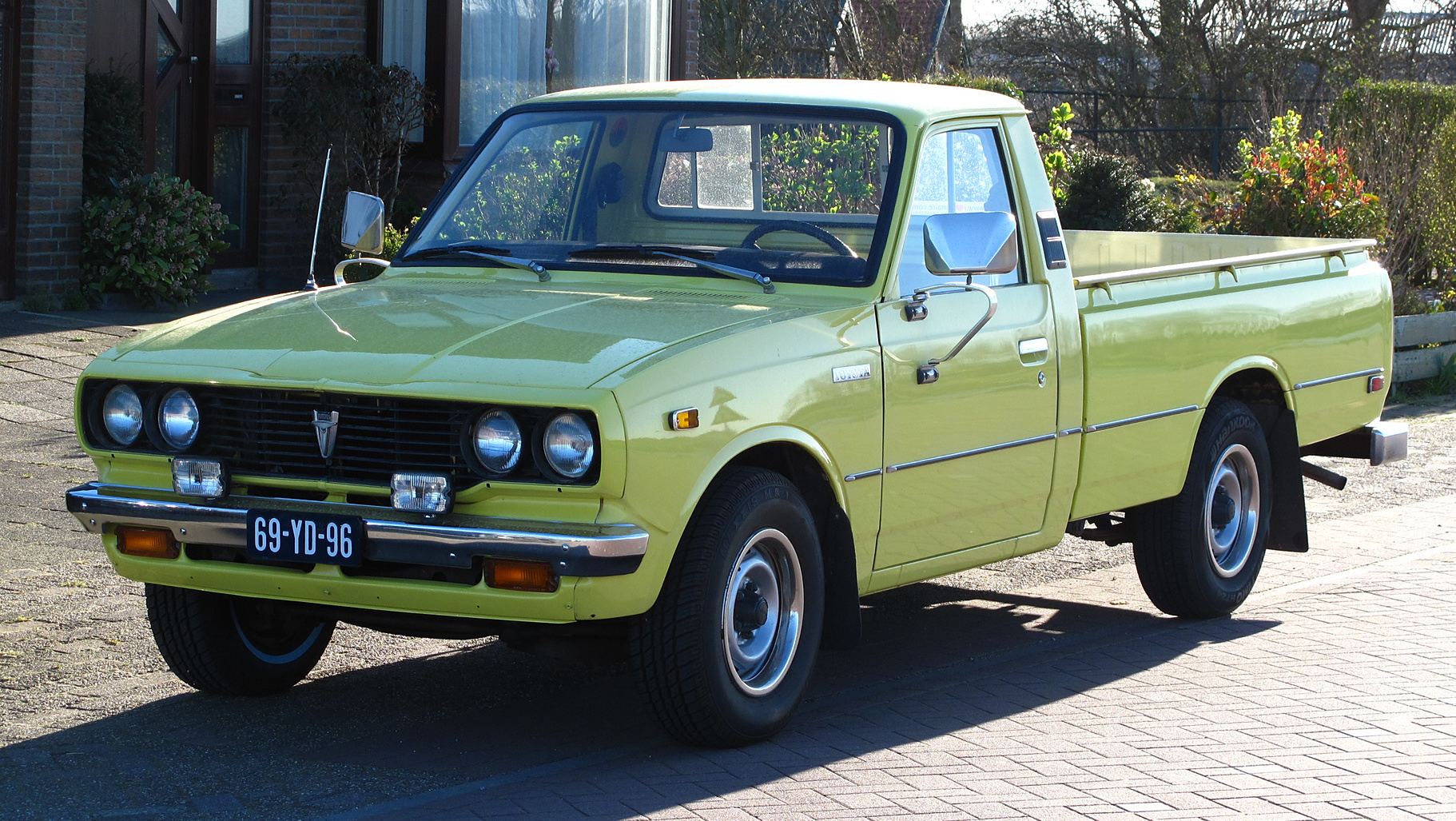
- 1975–1978 Toyota Pickup SR5 long bed (RN28)

Overview
- Model code: N20
- Also called: Toyota Pickup (North America, from 1975)
- Production: May 1972 – July 1978
- Assembly: Japan: Hamura, Tokyo (Hino); Indonesia: North Jakarta (PT. Multi Astra, 1976–1978); South Africa: Durban (Motor Assemblies Ltd.); Thailand: Samut Prakan (from September 1975); United States: Long Beach, California (Long Beach Fabricators: final assembly); New Zealand: Christchurch (Steel’s Motor Assemblies: SKD under contract)
- Designer: Masao Morimoto

Body and chassis
- Body style: 2-door pickup truck
- Layout: Front-engine, rear-wheel-drive

Powertrain
- Engine: Petrol: 1.6 L 12R I4 (RN20/25); 2.0 L 18R I4 (RN22/27); 2.2 L 20R I4 (RN23/28)
- Transmission: 3-speed automatic; 4-speed manual; 5-speed manual

Dimensions
- Wheelbase: 2,580 mm (101.6 in) (SWB); 2,795 mm (110.0 in) (LWB)
- Length: 4,275 mm (168.3 in) (SWB); 4,680 mm (184.3 in) (LWB)
- Width: 1,580 mm (62.2 in)
- Height: 1,570 mm (61.8 in)
- Curb weight: 1,075–1,115 kg (2,370–2,458 lb)

In May 1972, the 1973 model year Hilux was introduced, designated the RN20. Nicknamed the "RokeHi" (ロケハイ), a portmanteau of "Rocket Hilux", it has a more comfortable interior along with exterior updates. A 2.25 m (7.4 ft) "long bed" was an option for the first time in North American markets, although such a version had been available worldwide since April 1969. This received the "RN25" chassis code. The 2.0 litre 18R engine was available in Japan as well, with a three-speed automatic transmission available as an option. The 2.0-litre automatic model managed a "gentle" 136.1 km/h (84.6 mph) top speed in a period road test conducted in South Africa, in spite of a claimed 89 kW (121 PS; 119 hp).

The Hilux was facelifted in 1975 to be larger and with increased standard equipment. In North America, the new version also meant the introduction of the larger 2.2-litre 20R engine and the SR5 upscale trim package. A five-speed manual transmission became optional. In this market, the Hilux name was fully phased out in favour of "Pickup" by that year, having been dropped from brochure, advertising and manual books, starting in 1976 model year. Some North American motor-coach manufacturers began building Toyota motor-homes from the Hilux.

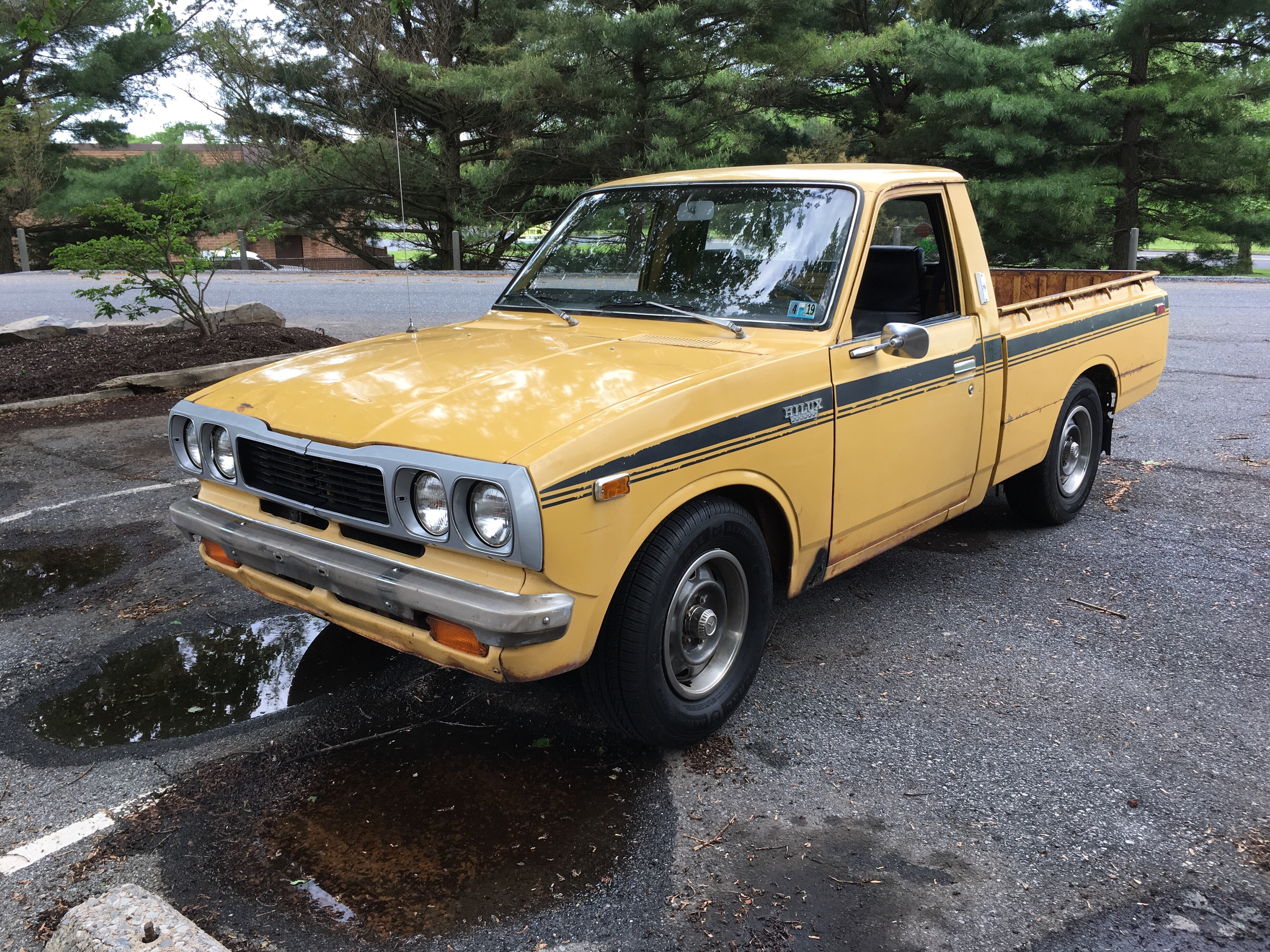
1972–1975 Toyota Hilux short bed (RN22)

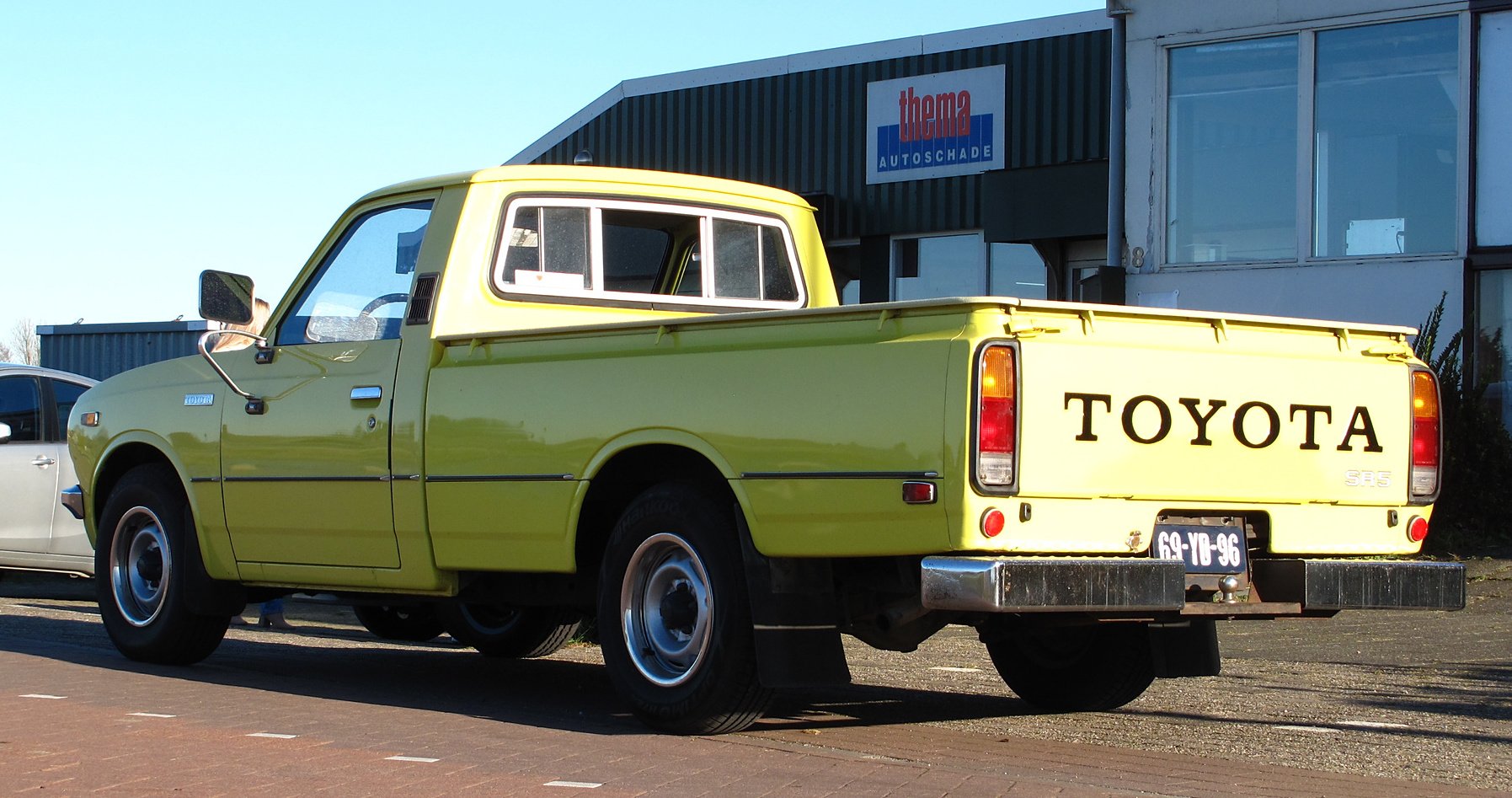
Rear view

=== Wolverine 4x4 ===
Starting in 1975 "Off Road Marketing" in Garden Grove, California in the United States developed a four-wheel-drive system for these trucks and marketed it as the Wolverine 4x4. Toyota never offered a factory four-wheel-drive system for this generation of Hilux, Off Road Marketing outfitted two-wheel-drive trucks with all the components necessary for four-wheel-drive. While they did manufacture many of the components themselves most of the major components such as the front axle, leaf springs, and transfer case were "off the shelf" and found on the Jeep CJ and other four-wheel-drive vehicles. The front axle is a Dana 30 (the rear axle remains Toyota), the transfer case is a Dana 20, and the leaf springs are made by Cambria Spring Co. The engine offered is the 2.2-litre 20R paired to a five-speed manual transmission. These trucks were available to be purchased at US Toyota dealerships throughout the country between 1975-1979. The Wolverine ceased production when Toyota began offering a factory four-wheel-drive option in the third generation Hilux.

Global markets:

- 1972–1978: 1.6 L (1587 cc) 12R I4, 83 PS (61 kW) (SAE gross, Japan), 67 PS (49 kW) (SAE net, general export)
- 1973–1978: 2.0 L (1968 cc) 18R I4, 105 PS (77 kW) (SAE gross, Japan)

North American markets:

- 1973–1974: 2.0 L (1968 cc) 18R SOHC I4, 108 hp (81 kW; 109 PS)
- 1975–1978: 2.2 L (2189 cc) 20R SOHC I4, 96 hp (72 kW; 97 PS)

== Third generation (N30, N40; 1978) ==
Third generation
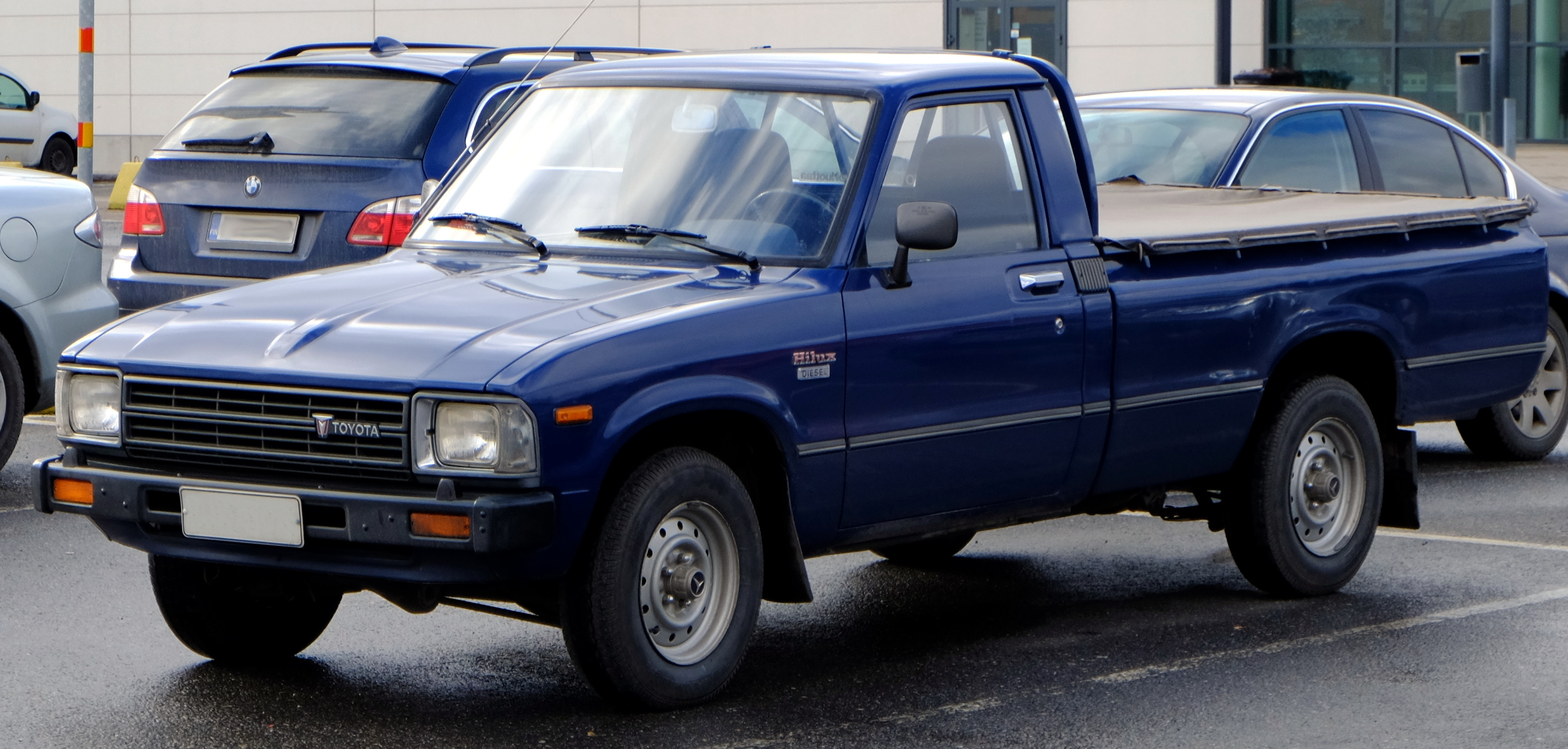
- 1981–1988 Toyota Hilux 2WD (LN40, facelift)

Overview
- Model code: N30 (SWB); N40 (LWB)
- Also called: Toyota Pickup (North America)
- Production: August 1978 – October 1983 (extended until September 1988)
- Assembly: Japan: Toyota City, Aichi (Tahara plant); Hamura, Tokyo (Hino); South Africa: Durban (Motor Assemblies Ltd.: 1979–1981); South Africa: Durban (TSAM: 1981–1984); Thailand: Samut Prakan; United States: Long Beach, California (TMM: final assembly); Zambia: Ndola (Mobile Motor Inc.: from May 1983)
- Designer: Minoru Oya

Body and chassis
- Body style: 2-door pickup truck; 4-door pickup truck
- Layout: Front-engine, rear-wheel-drive; Front-engine, four-wheel-drive
- Related: Toyota Trekker; Toyota Stout (K110)

Powertrain
- Engine: Petrol: 1.6 L 12R I4 (RN30/33/35/40/43/45); 2.0 L 18R I4 (RN31/36/39/41/46); 2.2 L 20R I4 (RN32/37/42/47); 2.4 L 22R I4 (RN34/38/44/48); Diesel: 2.2 L L I4 (LN30/36/40/46); 2.4 L 2L I4 (LN41)
- Transmission: 4-speed manual; 5-speed manual; 3-speed automatic

Dimensions
- Wheelbase: 2,585 mm (101.8 in) (N30); 2,800 mm (110.2 in) (N40)
- Length: 4,300–4,345 mm (169.3–171.1 in) (N30); 4,690–4,730 mm (184.6–186.2 in) (N40)
- Width: 1,610 mm (63.4 in) (2WD); 1,690 mm (66.5 in) (4WD)
- Height: 1,475–1,565 mm (58.1–61.6 in) (2WD); 1,675–1,765 mm (65.9–69.5 in) (4WD)
- Curb weight: 1,050–1,180 kg (2,315–2,600 lb) (2WD); 1,280–1,320 kg (2,820–2,910 lb) (4WD)

The redesigned Hilux (marketed as Hilux California in Japan) was introduced in August 1978, with a four-wheel-drive variant introduced in January 1979. The newer model was of similar dimensions to its predecessor, but both front and rear tracks were wider. A variant with a 90 mm (3.5 in) shorter cab – identified by the thinner B-pillar – was also available, mainly for the Japanese and Asian markets. Another change was the front suspension was changed from coil springs to a torsion bar design, still with a double wishbone layout. The four-wheel-drive variant – not offered with any engines smaller than the 2.0-litre "18R" – featured some common technology with the larger Land Cruiser. Its front axle was a live, leaf-sprung design unlike the more car-like type used on rear-wheel drive Hiluxes (this suspension setup was retained for base four-wheel-drive N100/110 models until 1997). The L series diesel engine was offered on the rear-wheel-drive variants from September 1979 and also on the four-wheel drive variants beginning in October 1981. The N40 chassis was also available as a double cab body style starting in October 1981. It has thinner C-pillar, similar to the short cab variant.

The Australian market originally received the 1.6-litre 12R engine in rear-wheel-drive models, while four-wheel-drive models have the 2.0-litre 18R-C engine with 63 kW (86 PS). These were all built on the longer-wheelbase, with either pickup or cab chassis bodywork. Top speed of the Australian Hilux four-wheel-drive was 130 km/h (81 mph).

Production of the N30/40 Hilux stopped in July 1983, but some rear-wheel-drive variations – 1.6-litre petrol and 2.2-litre diesel – continued production for the Japanese market in parallel with the next generation models. In August 1985, the diesel engine was replaced by a larger 2.4-litre 2L unit, exclusively for the LN41 long-wheelbase model.

In the North American markets, the Hilux (known as the Pickup) also saw the use of four-wheel-drive. This new four-wheel-drive setup featured a gear driven RF1A transfer case. This transfer case is unique in that its low-range reduction portion can be replicated, using what some refer to as a dual or triple transfer case. This results in a much lower overall gear ratio. It was the first Hilux available with an automatic transmission in that market. The double cab body style was never offered in the United States and Canada until the Hilux was discontinued in these markets in 1995.

In 1981, a vehicle development agreement was established between Toyota, Winnebago Industries and two other aftermarket customisers. This was to allow Toyota to enter the SUV market in North America. The vehicles which resulted from this collaboration were the Trekker (Winnebago), Wolverine, and the Trailblazer (Griffith). All three used the Hilux four-wheel-drive RV cab and chassis, and an all-fibreglass rear section (the Trailblazer had a steel bed with a fibreglass top). Research and development work on the Trekker led to the development of the 4Runner/Hilux Surf, which was introduced in 1984.

Toward the end of the SR5's production run (1983 1/2 model year), Toyota introduced the luxury Mojave trim for the United States market as a limited-production (3,500 units) model with options not available on any other Toyota pickup. With a list price of US$8,308 (equivalent to $26,856 in 2025), it had bucket seats, two-speaker multiplex radio, chrome front and rear bumpers, and deleted Toyota logos on either the grille or the tailgate. Cruise control, power steering, and air conditioning were optional. It was powered by the SR5's standard 2.4 L (150 cu in) inline-four engine.

In Thailand, this model was sold as the Toyota Hilux Super Star.

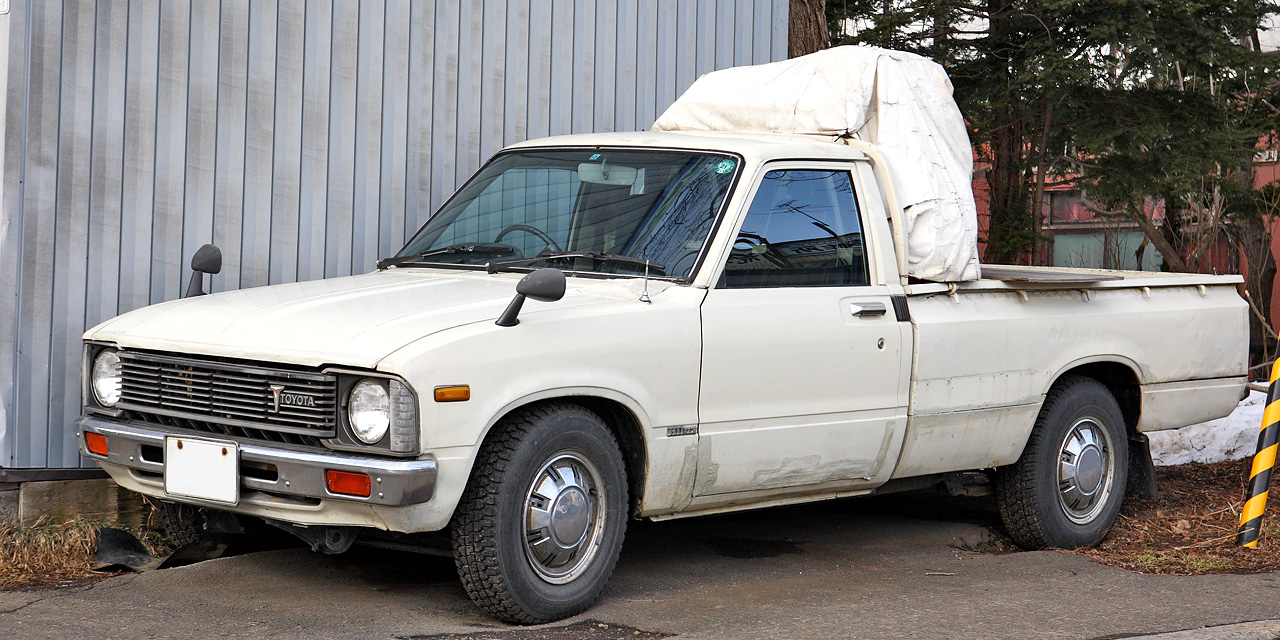
1978–1981 Toyota Hilux short cab

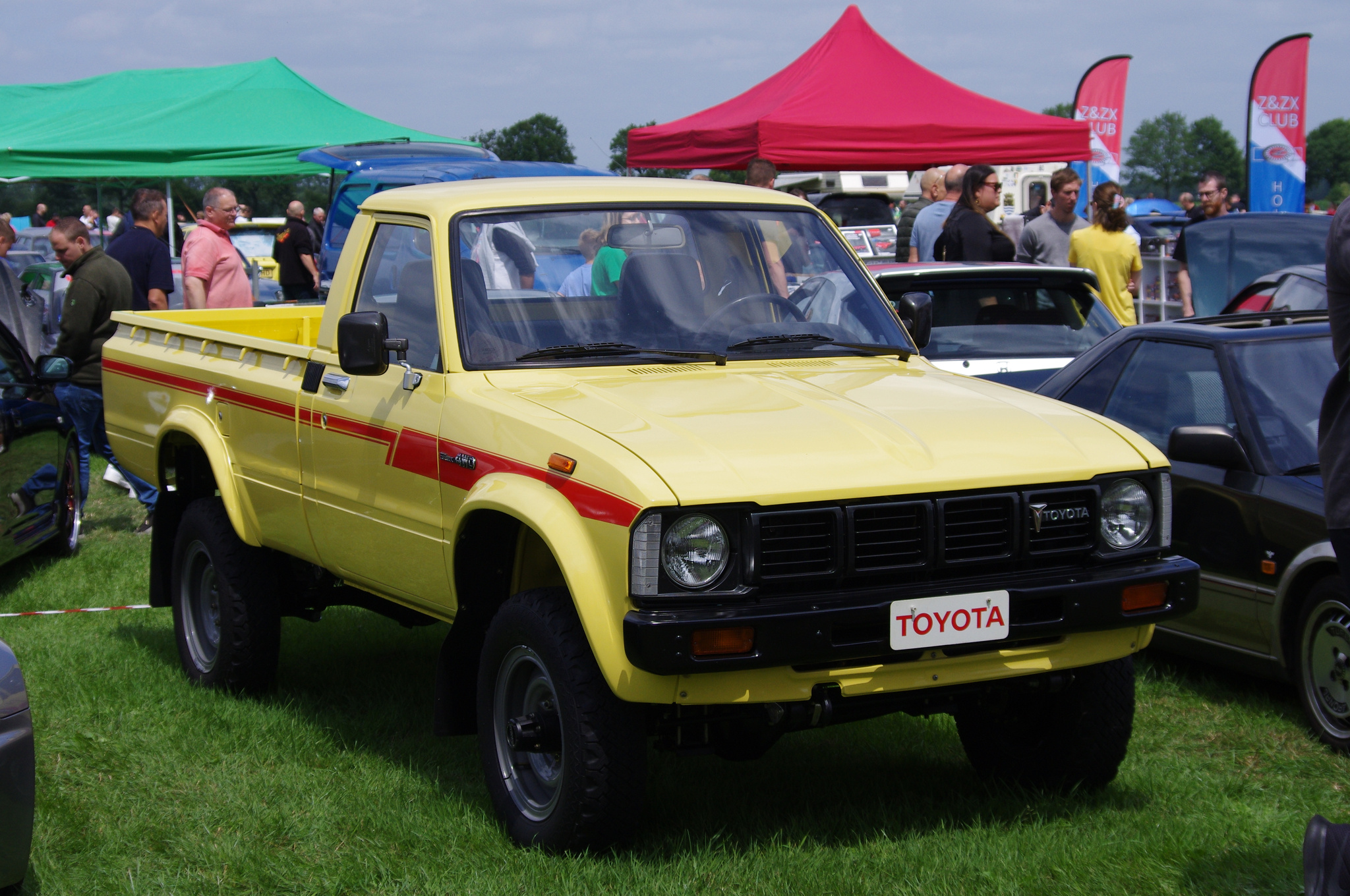
1979–1981 Toyota Hilux 4WD

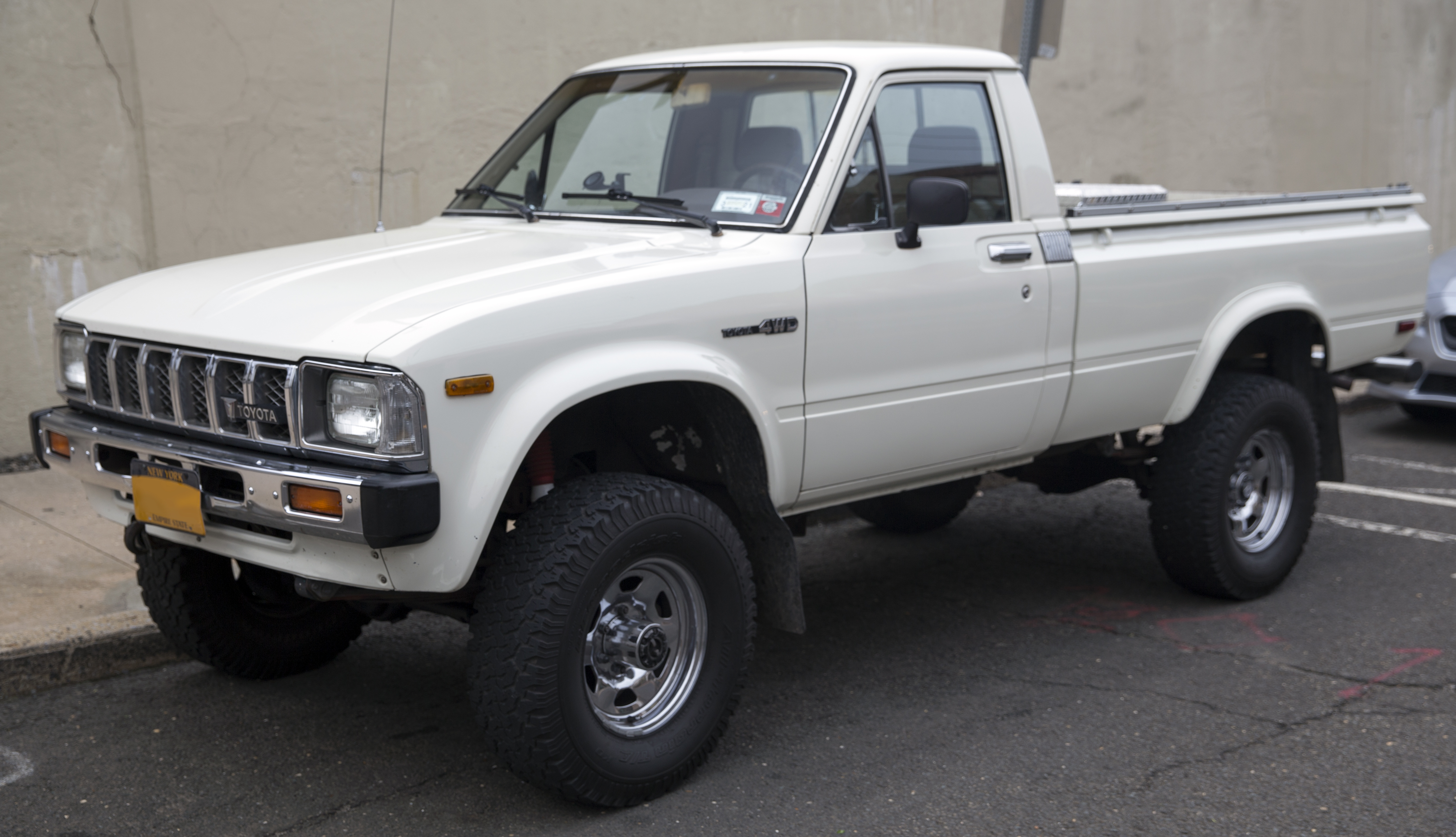
1981–1983 Toyota Pickup SR-5 4WD

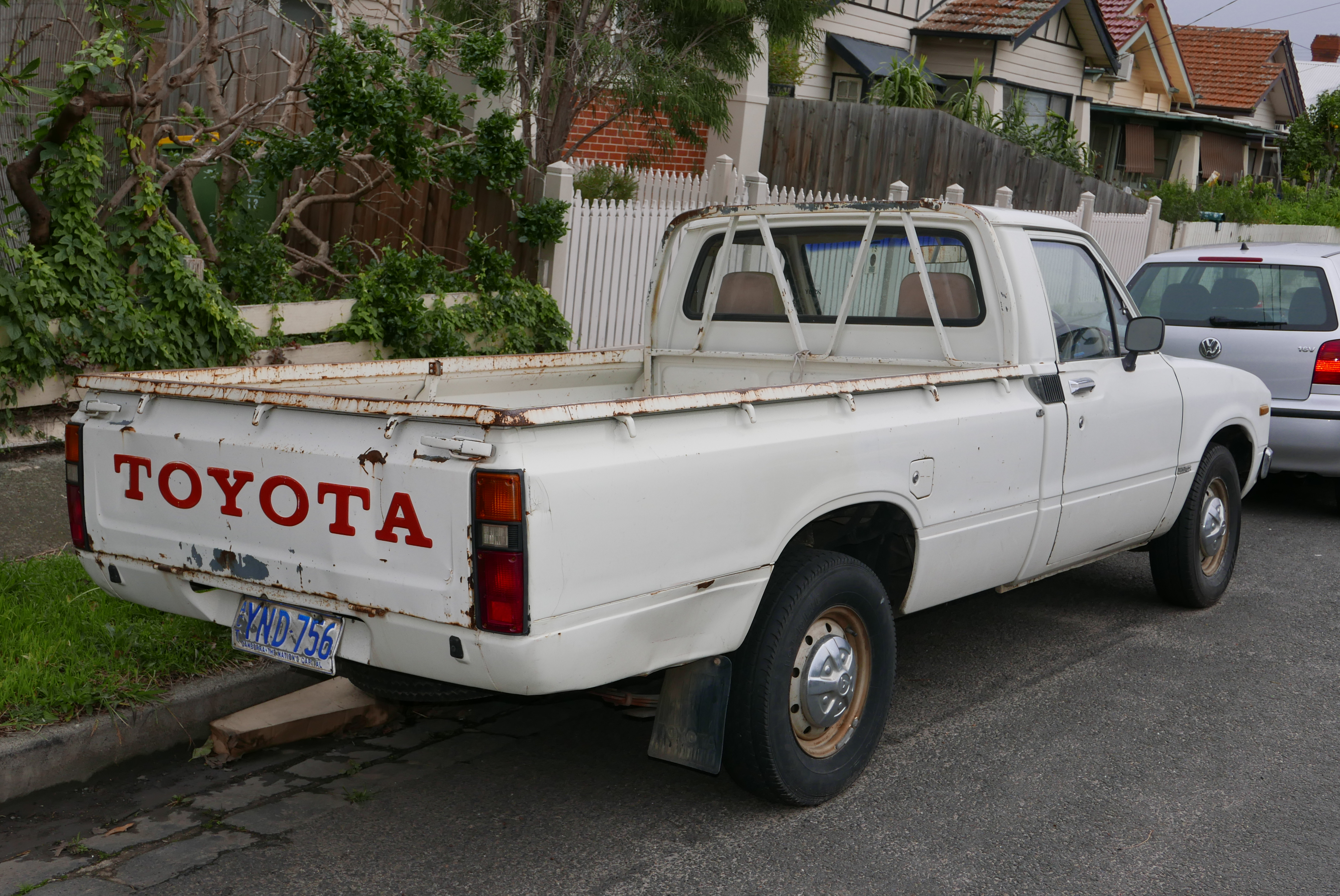
Rear view

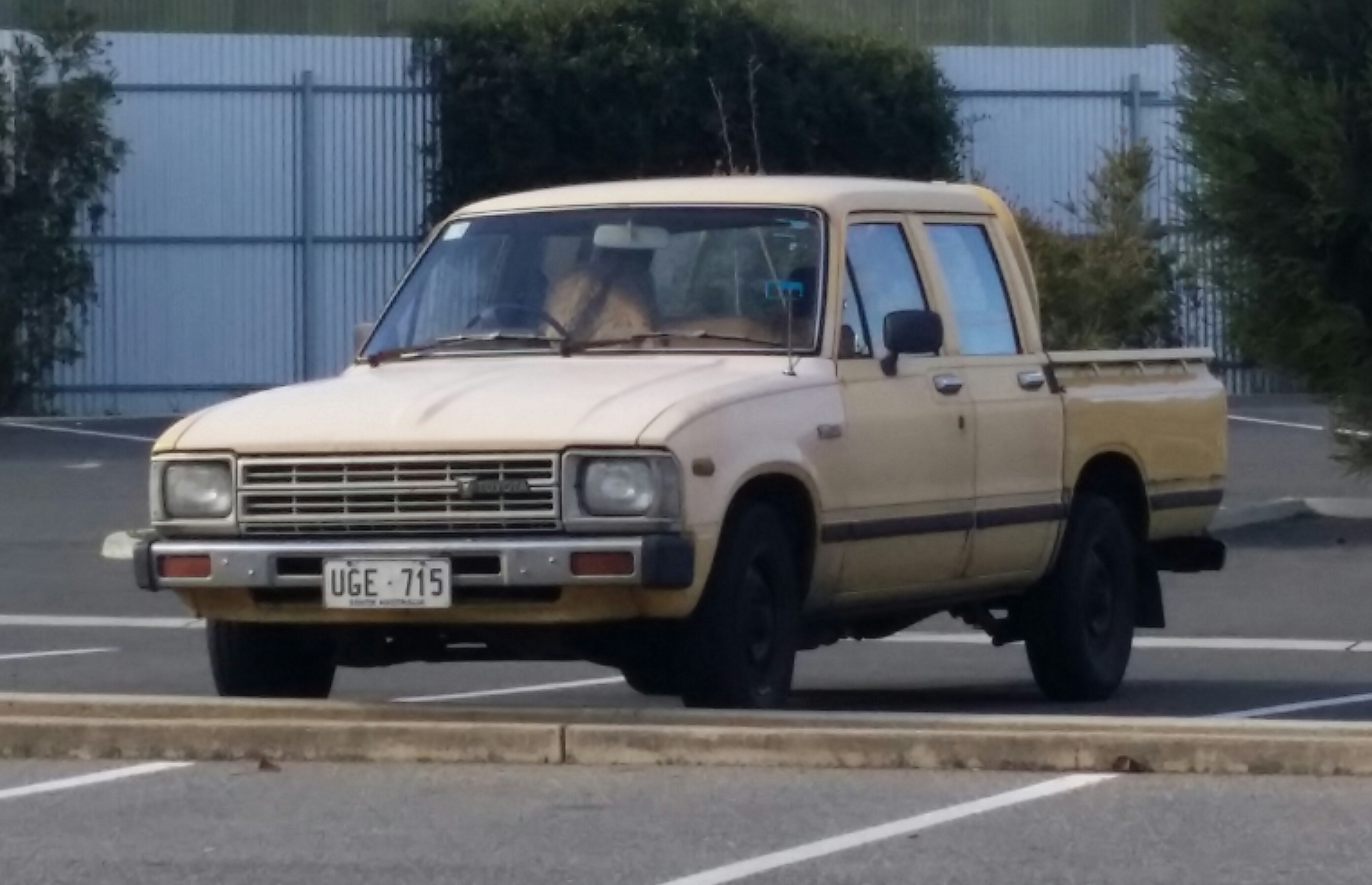
Double cab model (RN41)

=== Engines ===
- 1978–1983: 1.6 L (1,587 cc) 12R SOHC I4, 80 PS (59 kW) at 5,200 rpm and 12.5 kg⋅m (123 N⋅m) of torque at 3,000 rpm (RN30/40, Japan), 51 kW (69 PS; 68 hp) at 5,200 rpm (Europe)
- 1981–1983: 1.8 L preflow, 4-speed manual (Australia),
- 1978–1983: 2.0 L (1,968 cc) 18R SOHC I4, 89 PS (65 kW) at 5,000 rpm and 14.8 kg⋅m (145 N⋅m) of torque at 3,600 rpm (1983 European specifications)
- 1978–1980: 2.2 L (2,189 cc) 20R SOHC I4, 67 kW (91 PS; 90 hp) at 4,800 rpm and 165 N⋅m (122 lb⋅ft) of torque at 2,400 rpm
- 1981–1983: 2.4 L (2,366 cc) 22R SOHC I4, 98 PS; 97 hp (72 kW) at 4,800 rpm and 175 N⋅m (129 lb⋅ft) of torque at 2,800 rpm
- 1979–1983: 2.2 L diesel I4, 46 kW (63 PS; 62 hp) at 4,200 rpm and 126 N⋅m (93 lb⋅ft) of torque (SR5 long bed only in the United States), LN30/40

== Fourth generation (N50, N60, N70; 1983) ==
Fourth generation
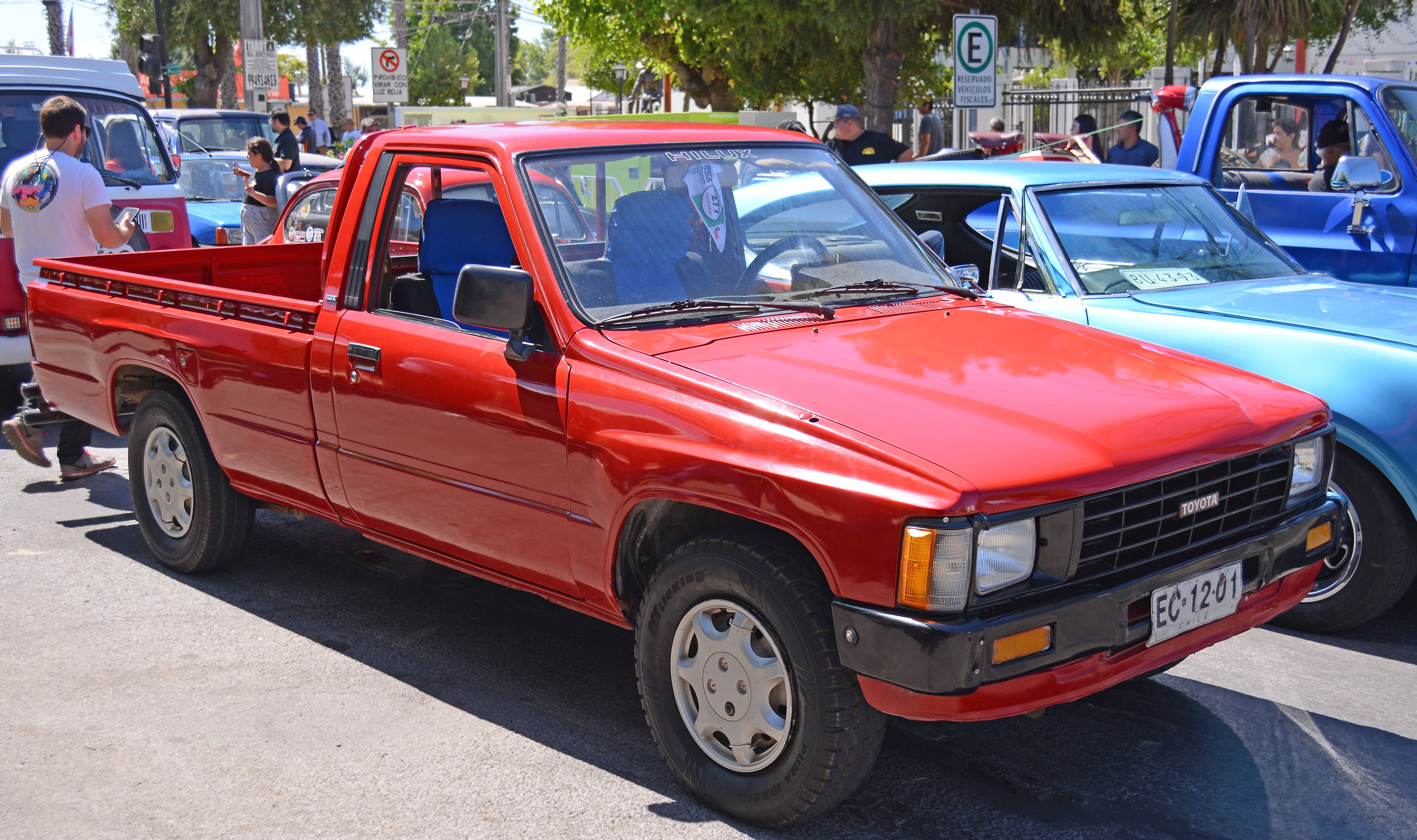
- 1983–1986 Toyota Hilux 2WD (YN51)

Overview
- Model code: N50 (2WD SWB/MWB); N60 (4WD SWB/MWB); N70 (2WD LWB, North America)
- Also called: Toyota Truck (North America)
- Production: August 1983 – August 1988; 1984–1998 (South Africa); January 1985 – March 1987 (Uruguay); December 1985 – June 1991 (Peru)
- Model years: 1984–1988
- Assembly: Japan: Toyota City, Aichi (Tahara plant); Hamura, Tokyo (Hino); Thailand: Samut Prakan (Samrong Plant); United States: Long Beach, California (TMM: final assembly); Uruguay: Montevideo (Ayax S.A./Ambrois & Cía); Peru: Lima (Toyota del Peru)
- Designer: Hiroshi Osawa

Body and chassis
- Body style: 2-door pickup truck; 4-door pickup truck
- Layout: Front-engine, rear-wheel-drive; Front-engine, four-wheel-drive
- Related: Toyota 4Runner/Hilux Surf (N60)

Powertrain
- Engine: Petrol: 1.6 L 1Y I4 (YN50/55); 1.8 L 2Y I4 (YN51/56); 2.0 L 3Y I4 (YN52/57/60/65); 2.2 L 4Y I4 (YN58/62/67); 2.4 L 22R, 22R-E I4 (RN50/55/58/67); 2.4 L 22R-TEC turbo I4 (RN55/61/66/70/75); 3.0 L 3VZ-E V6 (VZN61/66); Diesel: 2.2 L L I4 (LN50/55); 2.4 L 2L I4 (LN51/56/60/65); 2.4 L 2L-T turbo I4 (LN56/60/65/66); 2.8 L 3L I4 (LN57/67)
- Transmission: 4-speed manual; 5-speed manual; 3-speed automatic; 4-speed automatic

Dimensions
- Wheelbase: 2,615 mm (103.0 in) (SWB); 2,850 mm (112.2 in) (MWB); 3,085 mm (121.5 in) (LWB); 3,480 mm (137.0 in) (Extra LWB cab chassis)
- Length: 4,435 mm (174.6 in) (SWB); 4,675–4,830 mm (184.1–190.2 in) (MWB); 4,905–4,965 mm (193.1–195.5 in) (LWB); 4,470–5,100 mm (176.0–200.8 in) (cab chassis)
- Width: 1,620 mm (63.8 in) (2WD); 1,690 mm (66.5 in) (4WD)
- Height: 1,530–1,625 mm (60.2–64.0 in) (2WD); 1,705–1,805 mm (67.1–71.1 in) (4WD)
- Curb weight: 1,045–1,340 kg (2,304–2,954 lb) (2WD); 1,320–1,480 kg (2,910–3,263 lb) (4WD)

The August 1983 redesign (sold as 1984 model year vehicles in North America) introduced the Xtracab extended cab option, with 150 mm (6 in) of space behind the seat for in-cab storage. The R series engines were phased out for Japanese and international models in favour of the Y series engines. Two L series diesel engines were also offered: a 2.2-litre L and a 2.4-litre 2L. In Japan, the older rear wheel-drive N30/40 Hilux continued its production until the end of this generation, positioned as the cheapest model.

In August 1985, the 2.2-litre L diesel engine was discontinued, while a 2.2-litre 4Y petrol engine was added to the line up. The carbureted 22R engine subsequently became available outside North America, starting in the Middle East in January 1986. In August 1986, the truck went through a minor interior and exterior redesign, that included a new grille, a new 1 piece front bumper, an updated interior with full high door panels with faux leather stitching on the base models, a new steering wheel, the gauge cluster surround was more rounded and featured faux leather stitching on it, the dash pad featured a shorter tray than earlier models, the radio bezel was also colour matched to the rest of the interior, the top model tachometer gauge clusters had the pattern on the face changed from a grid pattern to horizontal lines, the outside door mirrors were also changed to have a more stream lined appearance, and the faceplate for the heater controls was also redesigned.

The Hilux-based 4Runner which made its entry in Australia, Americas, Europe and the Middle East in 1984 was based on this generation of the short wheelbase four-wheel-drive N60 Hilux; in Japan, it was called the Hilux Surf.

Starting with this generation, the Hilux was officially rebranded as the Truck in North America, however this and the next generation were still commonly referred to as "Pickup" by many users and enthusiasts. Similar to the previous generation, the double cab body style was not offered. Instead, two rear-wheel drive models with longer wheelbases were introduced in 1985 for the 1986 model year, exclusively for this market: a long bed Xtracab model (RN70), which featured a wheelbase 235 mm (9.3 in) longer than the double cab, and a cab chassis (RN75) with dual rear wheels and a 3,480 mm (137.0 in) wheelbase. The carbureted 2.4-litre 22R engine was carried over from the Pickup, while also introducing the fuel-injected 22R-EC engine option. Two 2.4-litre diesel engines were also introduced in naturally aspirated and turbocharged forms. These diesel engines were discontinued after the 1986 model year in the United States (1988 model year in Canada), this was due to higher performance expectations from customers and the wide availability of inexpensive petrol.

The 1986 model year also saw the introduction of a turbocharged 22R-TEC engine option in North America, perhaps due to increasing competition from Nissan who already offered the Hardbody V6 truck at this time. The automatic shifter on rear-wheel drive models was relocated to the column, and optional automatic differential disconnect for the front differential (an alternative to automatic locking hubs). Another North American market special treatment was the replacement of the solid front axle with leaf spring to a double wishbone independent front suspension with torsion bar setup in the four-wheel drive model. The double wishbone setup for four-wheel drive models was implemented in the next generation for the international market, although the solid front axle was also offered for base models until 1997. From 1987 model year, a 3.0-litre V6 petrol engine was introduced to replace the turbocharged 22R-TEC engine option for the four-wheel drive models.

Toyota introduced a new generation of the Hilux in most markets in late 1988 but the fourth generation remained in production until 1998 in South Africa. This was due to South African "content laws" which made it cheaper to continue the production of the fourth generation of the Hilux, rather than to retool the plant for the fifth generation model. Despite this, the South African market Hilux was upgraded with a 2.8-litre 3L diesel engine from the next generation in 1995.

In Thailand, this generation was sold as the Toyota Hilux Hercules/Hero.

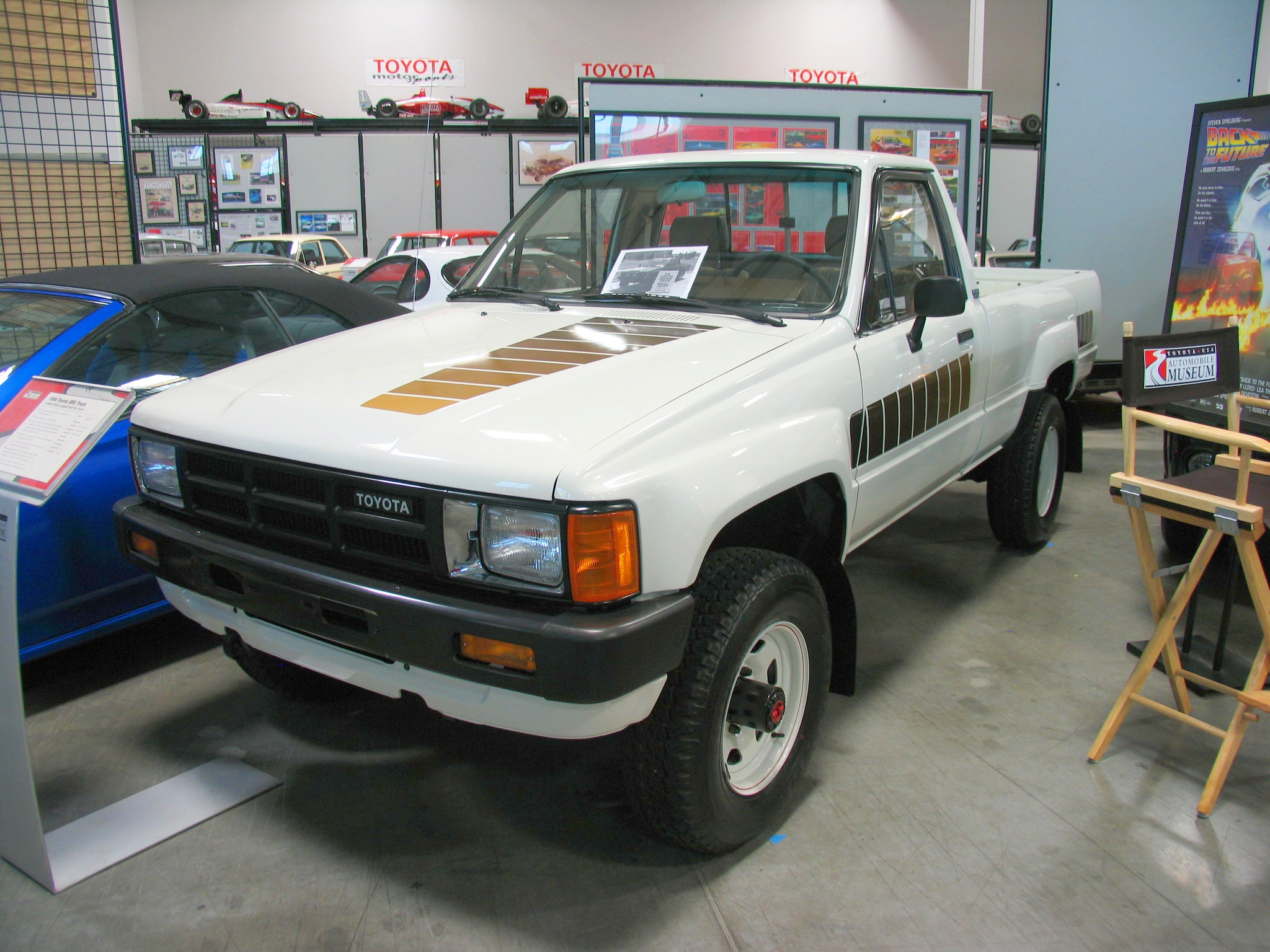
1983–1986 Toyota Truck 4WD

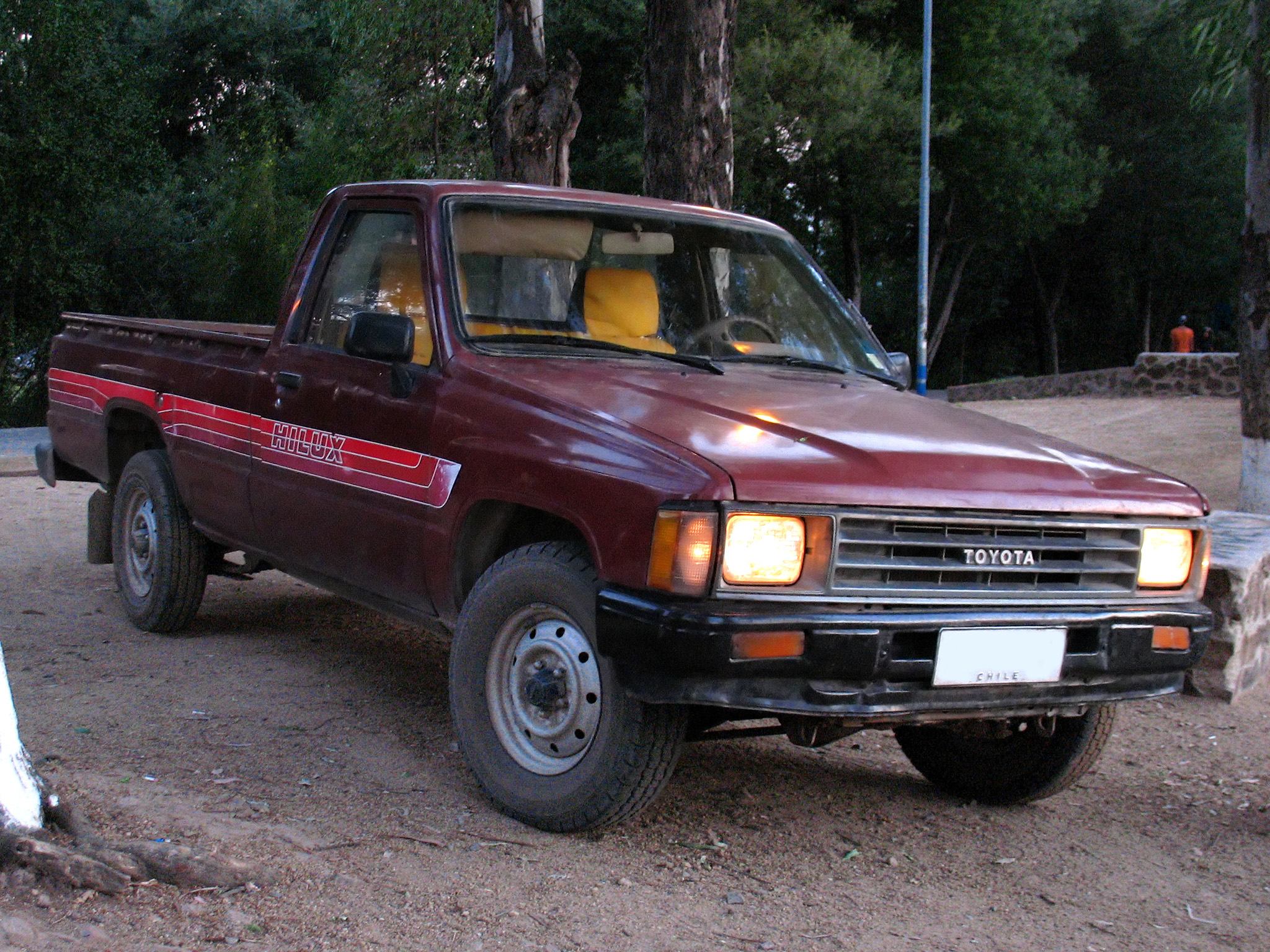
1986–1988 Toyota Hilux 2WD

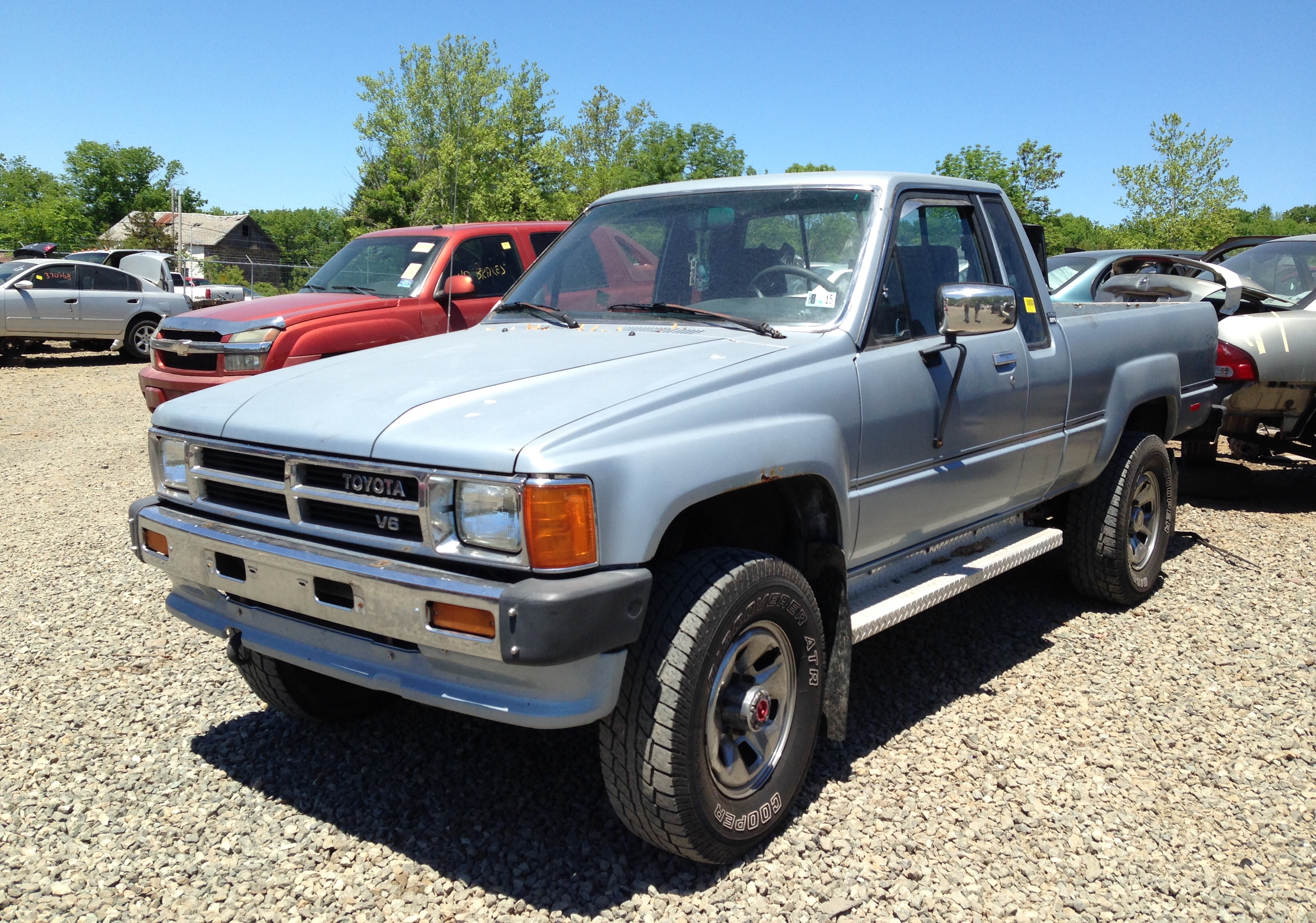
1986–1988 Toyota Truck Xtracab 4WD

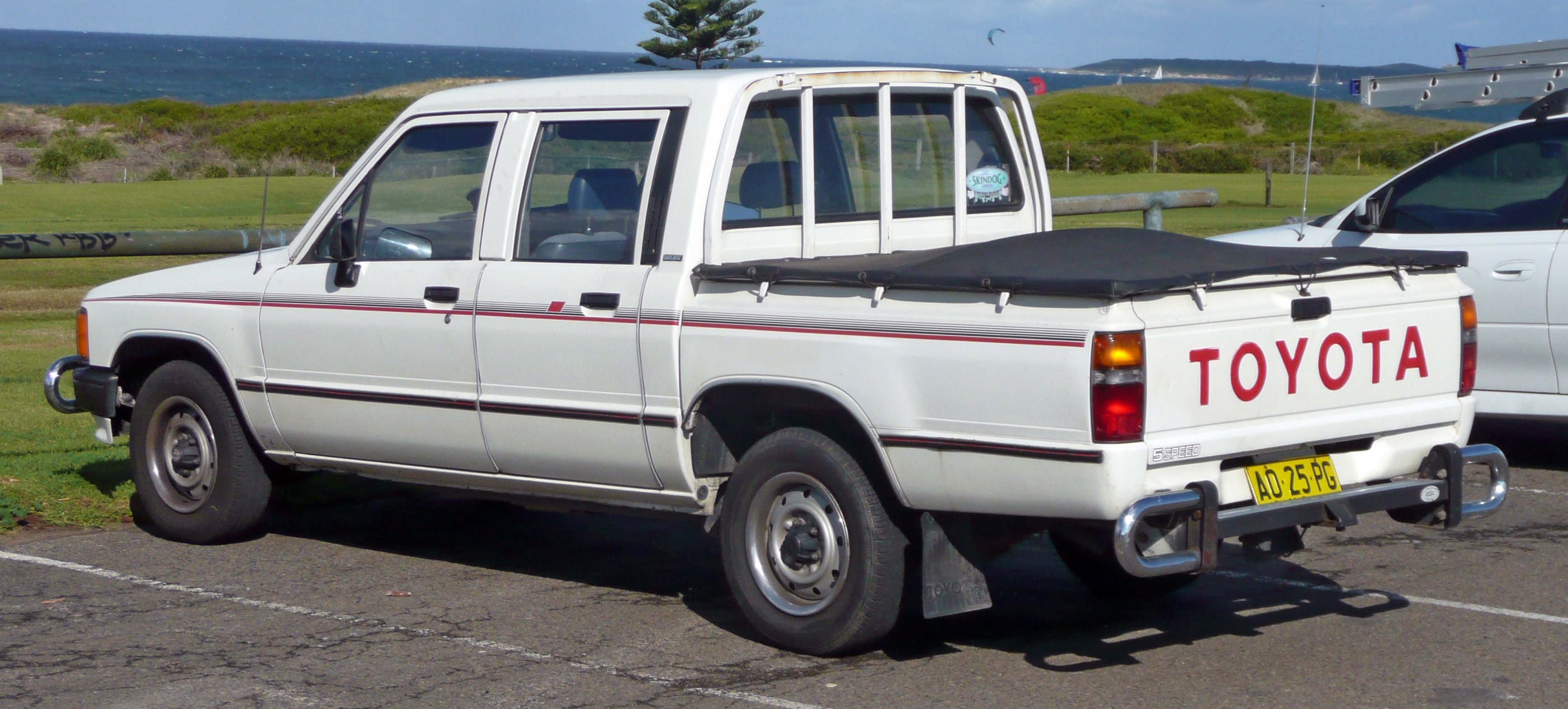
Toyota Hilux double-cab 2WD

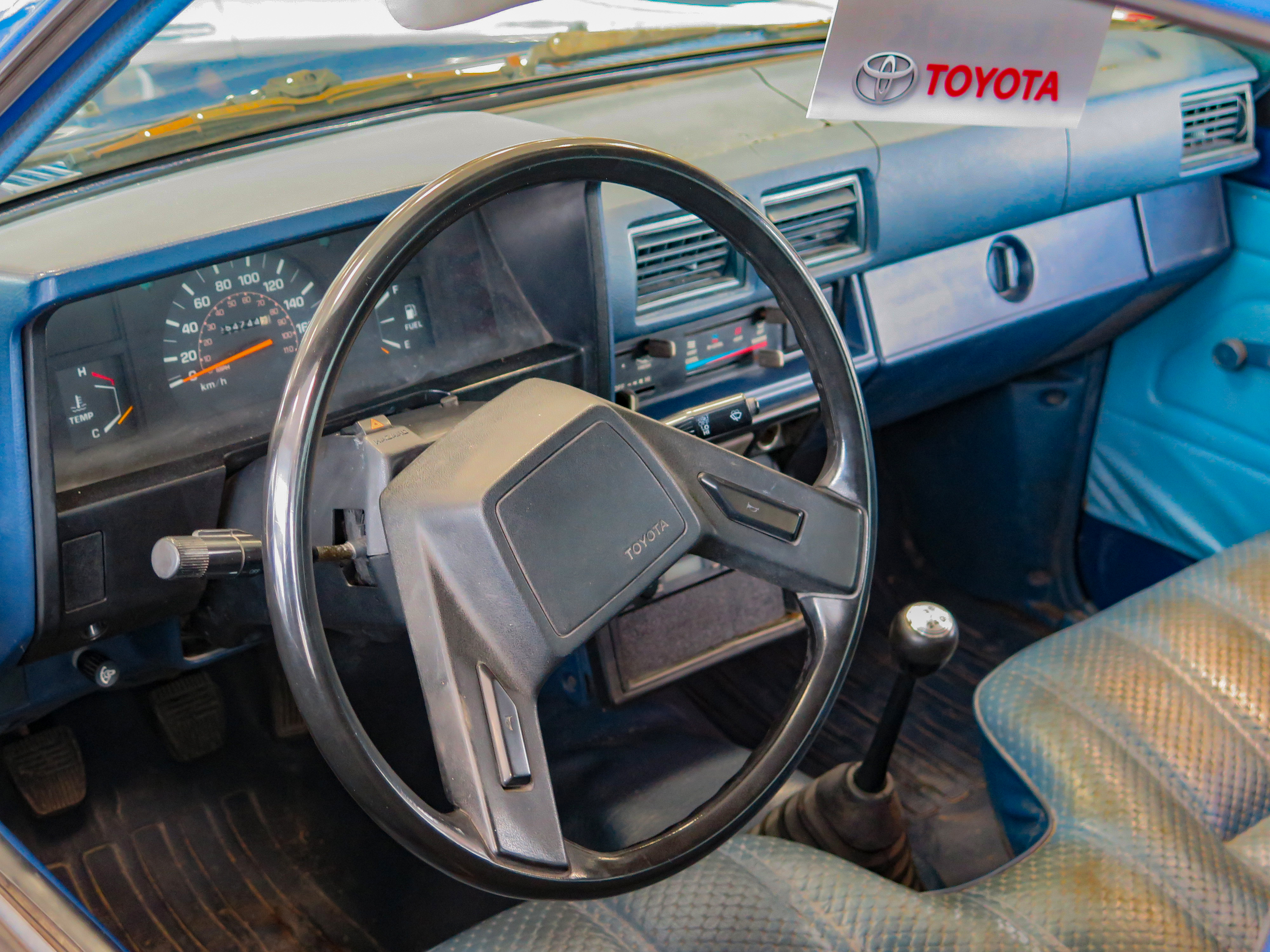
1983–1986 interior (North American market)

=== Engines ===
Calendar years	Capacity	Code	Features	Power	Torque	Comments
1983–1990	1,626 cc (1.6 L)	1Y	OHV I4	54 kW (73 PS; 72 hp) at 4,800 rpm	124 N⋅m (91 lb⋅ft) at 3,000 rpm	General export, Australia, the Middle East and South Africa.
1983–1998	1,812 cc (1.8 L)	2Y	OHV I4	58 kW (79 PS; 78 hp) at 4,800 rpm	140 N⋅m (103 lb⋅ft) at 2,600 rpm	Japan, Europe, Australia and South Africa.
1983–1988	1,998 cc (2.0 L)	3Y	OHV I4	65 kW (88 PS; 87 hp) at 4,600 rpm	157 N⋅m (116 lb⋅ft) at 3,000 rpm	Except North America.
1983–1984	2,366 cc (2.4 L)	22R	SOHC I4	74 kW (101 PS; 99 hp) at 4,800 rpm	185 N⋅m (136 lb⋅ft) at 2,800 rpm	North America
1983–1984	2,366 cc (2.4 L)	22R-EC	SOHC fuel injected I4	79 kW (107 PS; 106 hp) at 4,800 rpm	176 N⋅m (130 lb⋅ft) at 2,800 rpm	North America
1983–1985	2,188 cc (2.2 L)	L	I4 diesel	50 kW (68 PS; 67 hp) at 4,200 rpm	130 N⋅m (96 lb⋅ft) at 2,400 rpm	Japan, Australia, Europe and general export.
1983–1988	2,446 cc (2.4 L)	2L	I4 diesel	55 kW (75 PS; 74 hp) at 4,000 rpm	155 N⋅m (114 lb⋅ft) at 2,200 rpm	Except the Middle East.
1984–1998	2,366 cc (2.4 L)	22R	SOHC I4 (2nd gen 22R engine)	76 kW (103 PS; 102 hp) at 4,800 rpm	180 N⋅m (133 lb⋅ft) at 2,800 rpm	Revised engine design in 1984 for North America. Available in the Middle East from 1986 and South Africa from 1994.
1984–1988	2,366 cc (2.4 L)	22R-EC	SOHC fuel injected I4 (2nd gen 22R engine)	86 kW (117 PS; 115 hp) at 4,800 rpm	190 N⋅m (140 lb⋅ft) at 2,800 rpm	North America
1986–1998	2,237 cc (2.2 L)	4Y	OHV I4	69 kW (94 PS; 93 hp) at 4,400 rpm	179 N⋅m (132 lb⋅ft) at 2,600 rpm	Except Japan and North America.
1985–1987	2,366 cc (2.4 L)	22R-TEC	SOHC turbocharged fuel injected I4	101 kW (137 PS; 135 hp) at 4,800 rpm	235 N⋅m (173 lb⋅ft) at 2,800 rpm	North America
1984–1987	2,446 cc (2.4 L)	2L-T	I4 turbodiesel	62 kW (84 PS; 83 hp) at 4,000 rpm	186 N⋅m (137 lb⋅ft) at 2,400 rpm	1984–1985 in the US, 1984–1987 in Canada.
1987–1988	2,958 cc (3.0 L)	3VZ-E	fuel injected V6	112 kW (152 PS; 150 hp) at 4,800 rpm	244 N⋅m (180 lb⋅ft) at 2,400 rpm	North America
1995–1998	2,779 cc (2.8 L)	3L	I4 diesel	65 kW (88 PS; 87 hp) at 4,000 rpm	186 N⋅m (137 lb⋅ft) at 2,400 rpm	South Africa

== Fifth generation (N80, N90, N100, N110, N200; 1988) ==
Fifth generation
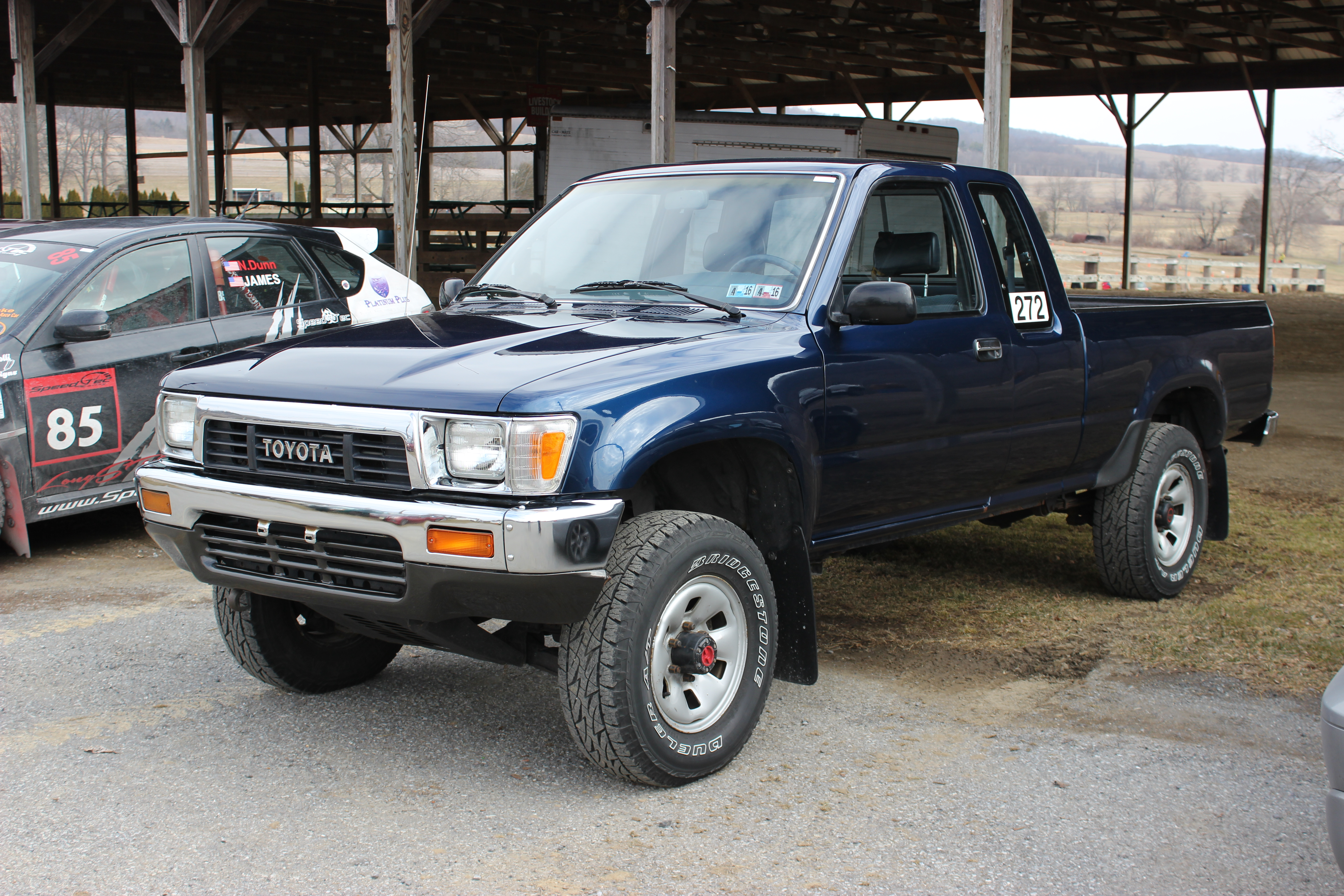
- 1988–1991 Toyota Truck Xtracab 4WD (RN110)

Overview
- Model code: N80 (2WD SWB/MWB); N90 (2WD LWB); N100 (4WD SWB/MWB); N110 (4WD LWB); N200 (2001 facelift MWB)
- Also called: Toyota Truck (North America); Volkswagen Taro (Europe)
- Production: September 1988–February 2005
- Assembly: Japan: Toyota City, Aichi (Tahara plant); Hamura, Tokyo (Hino); Argentina: Zárate (Toyota Argentina S.A., from March 1997); Colombia: Envigado (Sofasa, from 1993); Germany: Hanover (Volkswagen AG: Volkswagen Taro); Thailand: Samrong Tai (Toyota Motor Thailand); United States: Fremont, California (NUMMI: 1990–1995); Long Beach, California (TABC, final assembly: 1988–1995)
- Designer: Shigeo Asai

Body and chassis
- Body style: 2-door pickup truck; 4-door pickup truck
- Layout: Front-engine, rear-wheel-drive; Front-engine, four-wheel-drive
- Related: Toyota 4Runner/Hilux Surf (N120/N130); Toyota Classic; Toyota T100; Volkswagen Taro

Powertrain
- Engine: Petrol: 1.8 L 2Y I4 (YN80/85); 2.0 L 3Y, 3Y-E I4 (YN81/86/100/105/107); 2.2 L 4Y I4 (YN87/92/106/110); 2.4 L 22R, 22R-E I4 (RN80/85/90/101/106/110); 2.7 L 3RZ-FE I4 (RZ200); 3.0 L 3VZ-E V6 (VZN85/90/95/100/105/110); Diesel: 2.4 L 2L I4 (LN80/85/90/105/108/110); 2.4 L 2L-TE turbo I4 (LN108/112); 2.8 L 3L I4 (LN81/86/100/106/107/109/111); 3.0 L 5L I4 (LN200/205); 3.0 L 1KZ-TE turbo I4 (KZ205)
- Transmission: 4-speed manual; 5-speed manual; 4-speed automatic

Dimensions
- Wheelbase: International: 2,615 mm (103.0 in) (SWB); 2,850 mm (112.2 in) (MWB); 3,085 mm (121.5 in) (2WD LWB Xtracab); 3,095 mm (121.9 in) (4WD LWB Xtracab); Japan (4WD): 2,605 mm (102.6 in) (short bed); 2,840 mm (111.8 in) (long bed/pre-1991 double cab); 2,855 mm (112.4 in) (post-1991 double cab)
- Length: 4,430–4,435 mm (174.4–174.6 in) (SWB); 4,690–4,725 mm (184.6–186.0 in) (MWB long bed/double cab); 4,905 mm (193.1 in) (LWB Xtracab)
- Width: 1,650–1,690 mm (65.0–66.5 in) (2WD); 1,690–1,790 mm (66.5–70.5 in) (4WD)
- Height: 1,520–1,600 mm (59.8–63.0 in) (2WD); 1,705–1,805 mm (67.1–71.1 in) (4WD)
- Curb weight: 1,140–1,320 kg (2,513–2,910 lb) (2WD); 1,390–1,570 kg (3,064–3,461 lb) (4WD)

The next redesign, launched in September 1988, introduced an even longer-wheelbase option, 3,095 mm (121.9 in) for four-wheel drive Xtracab models, while Japanese market Hiluxes were initially offered with four different wheelbases and no Xtracab option as before. Its one-piece cargo-box walls eliminated the rust-prone seams that were found in earlier models. The Xtracabs now featured more room behind the front seats than the last generation which allowed optional jump-seats for rear passengers, a feature more in line with competitors of the time. The rear-wheel drive V6 Xtracab SR5 earned Motor Trend magazine's Truck of the Year award that year. Like the previous generation, all North American four-wheel-drive models were equipped with a double wishbone and torsion bar front suspension, whereas in international markets, this setup was initially limited to Xtracab models.

The Hilux received a minor facelift in 1991 (for the 1992 model year), which was a grille change incorporating the new Toyota emblem that had been recently adopted. For Japanese market, the wheelbase of four-wheel-drive double cab model was extended from 2,840 mm (111.8 in) to 2,855 mm (112.4 in), making it the fifth wheelbase variant offered in the country. The top trims four-wheel-drive double cab models were also upgraded to a double wishbone front suspension, while the lower trims and single cab variants retained the older live axle with leaf springs until 1997. International models outside of North America received another facelift and improvement in 1994, with new front fascias.

In 1991, North American production began at the NUMMI plant in Fremont, California. It was during this generation that Toyota discontinued the Hilux line in North America (where it was marketed as the "Toyota Truck"), replacing it with the new Tacoma for the 1995 model year.

Volkswagen built and marketed the Hilux under the Volkswagen Taro name from February 1989 to March 1997. It was also sold in Thailand as the Toyota Hilux Mighty-X.

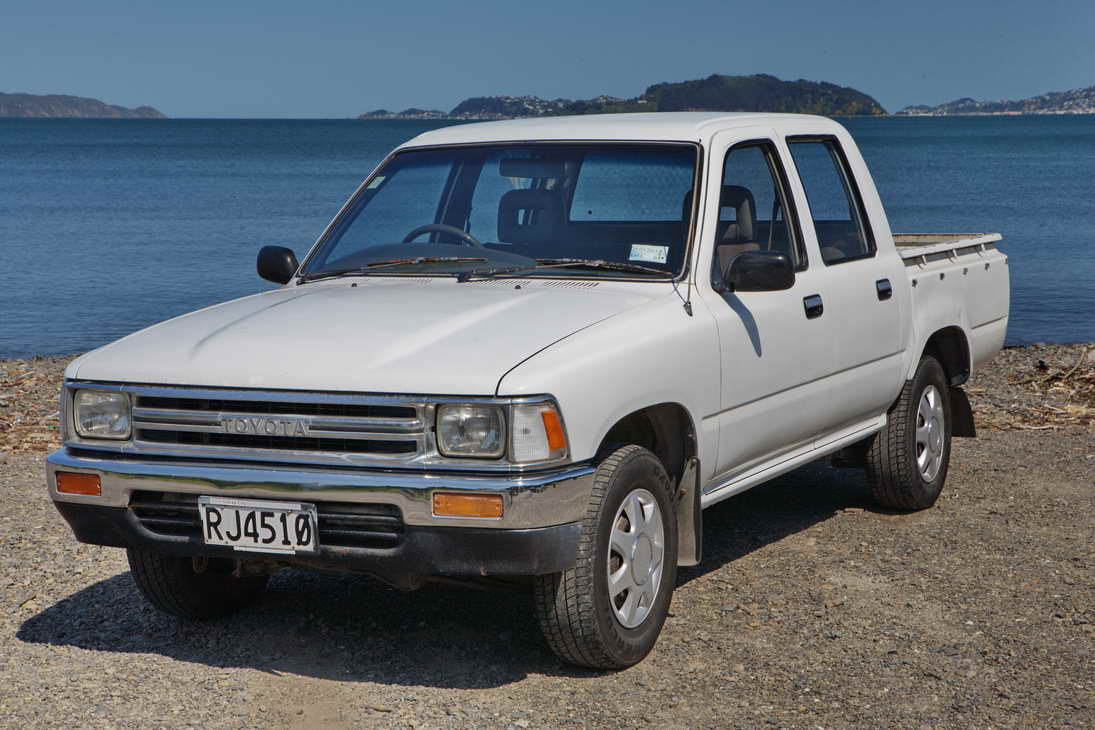
1988–1991 Toyota Hilux double cab 2WD

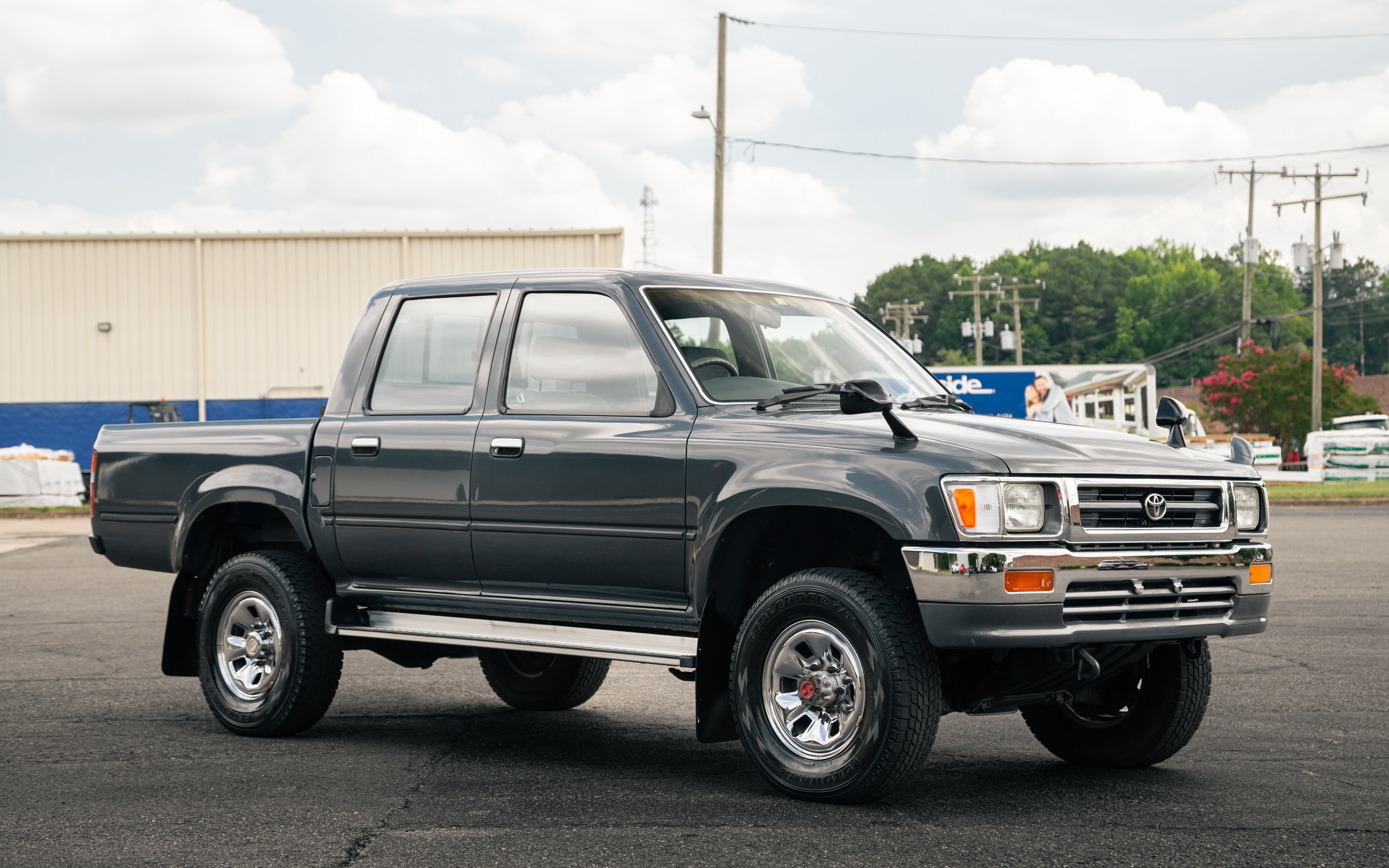
1991–1994 Toyota Hilux double cab 4WD

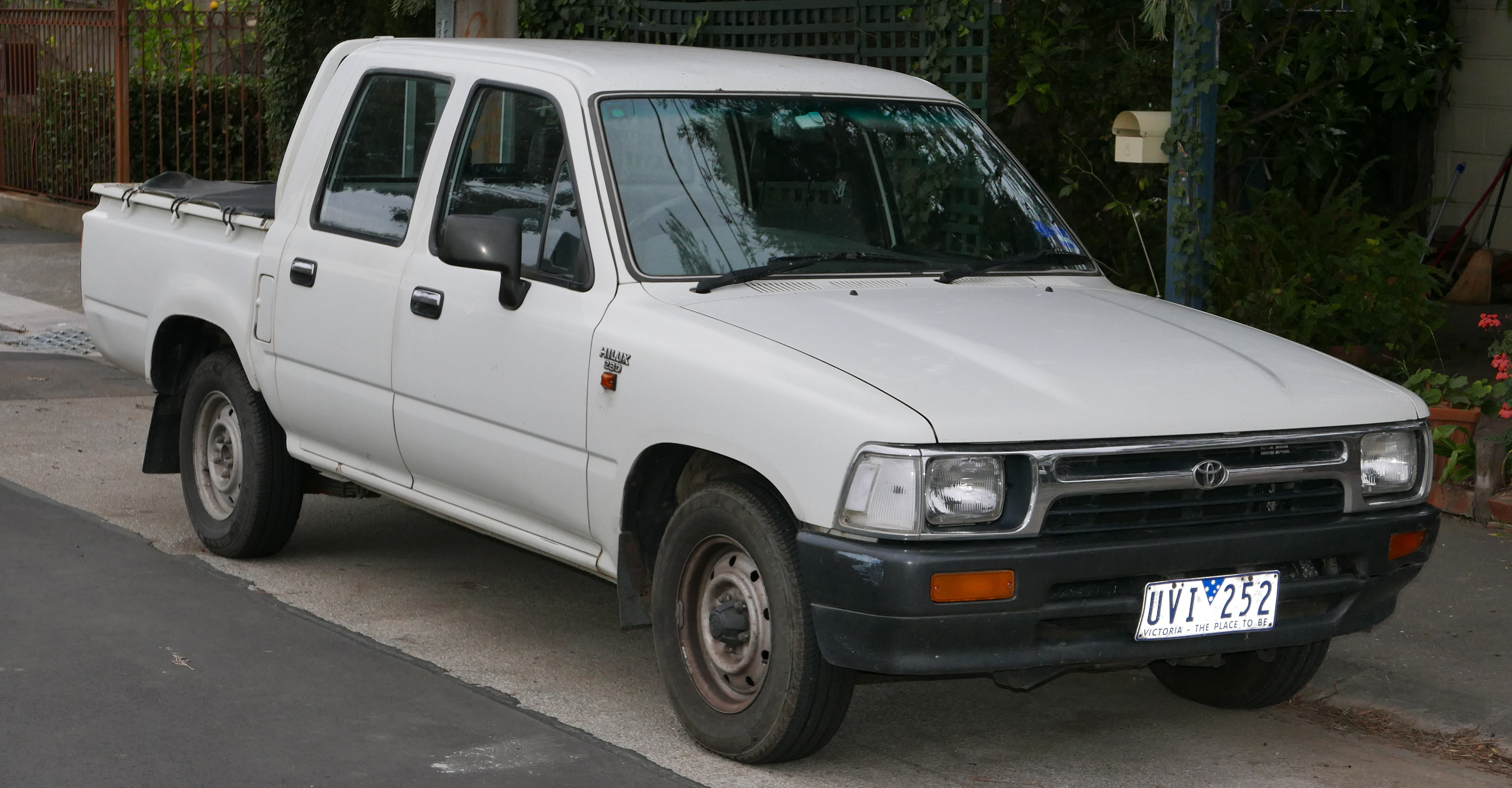
1991–1994 Toyota Hilux double cab 2WD

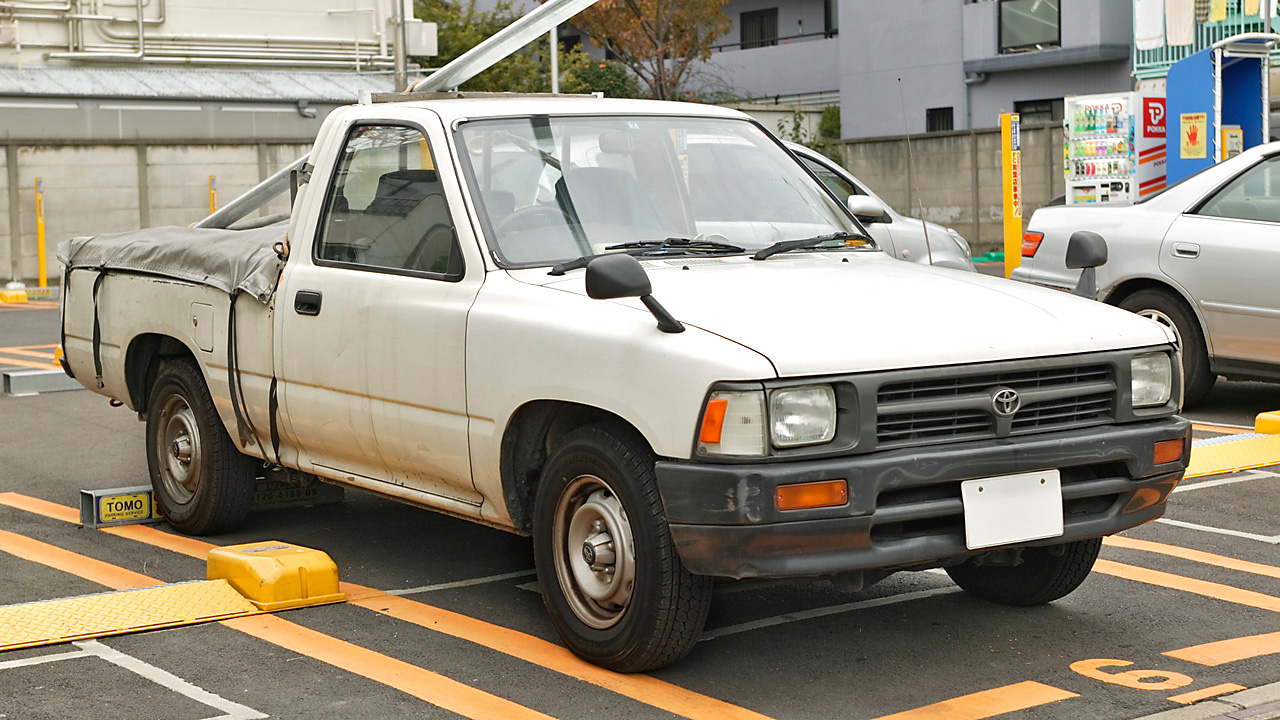
1994–1998 Toyota Hilux 2WD

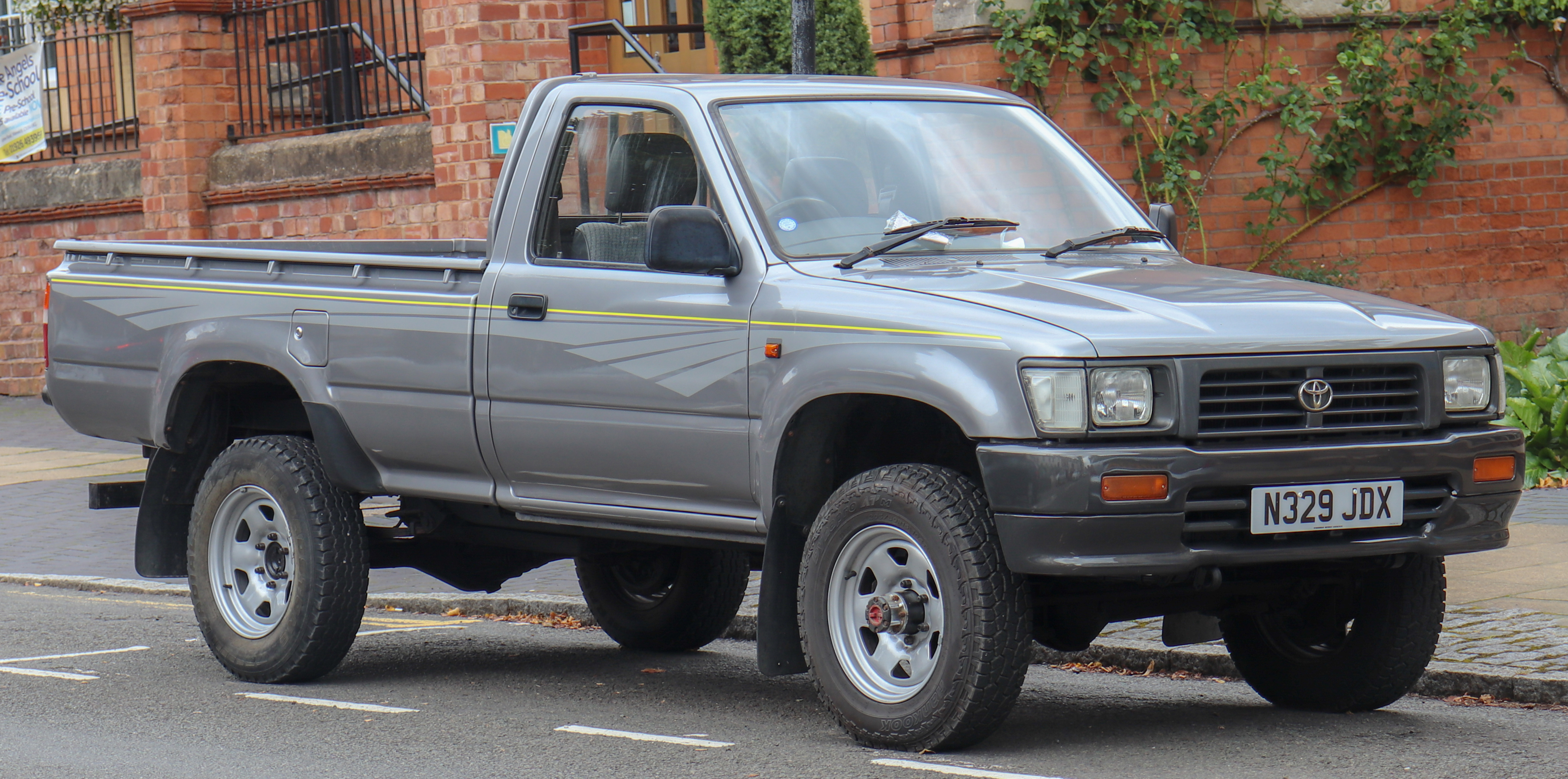
1994–1998 Toyota Hilux 4WD

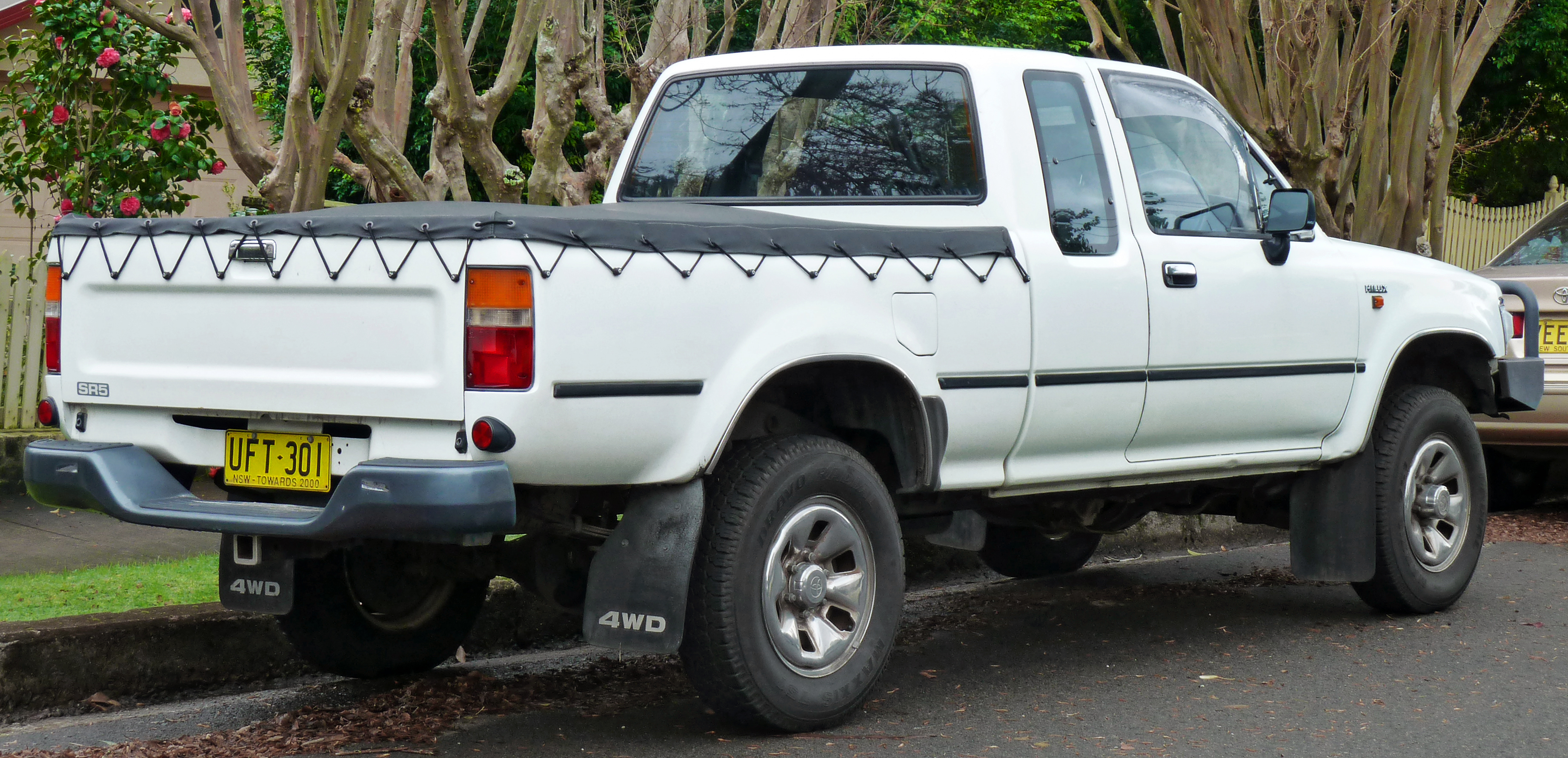
Rear view

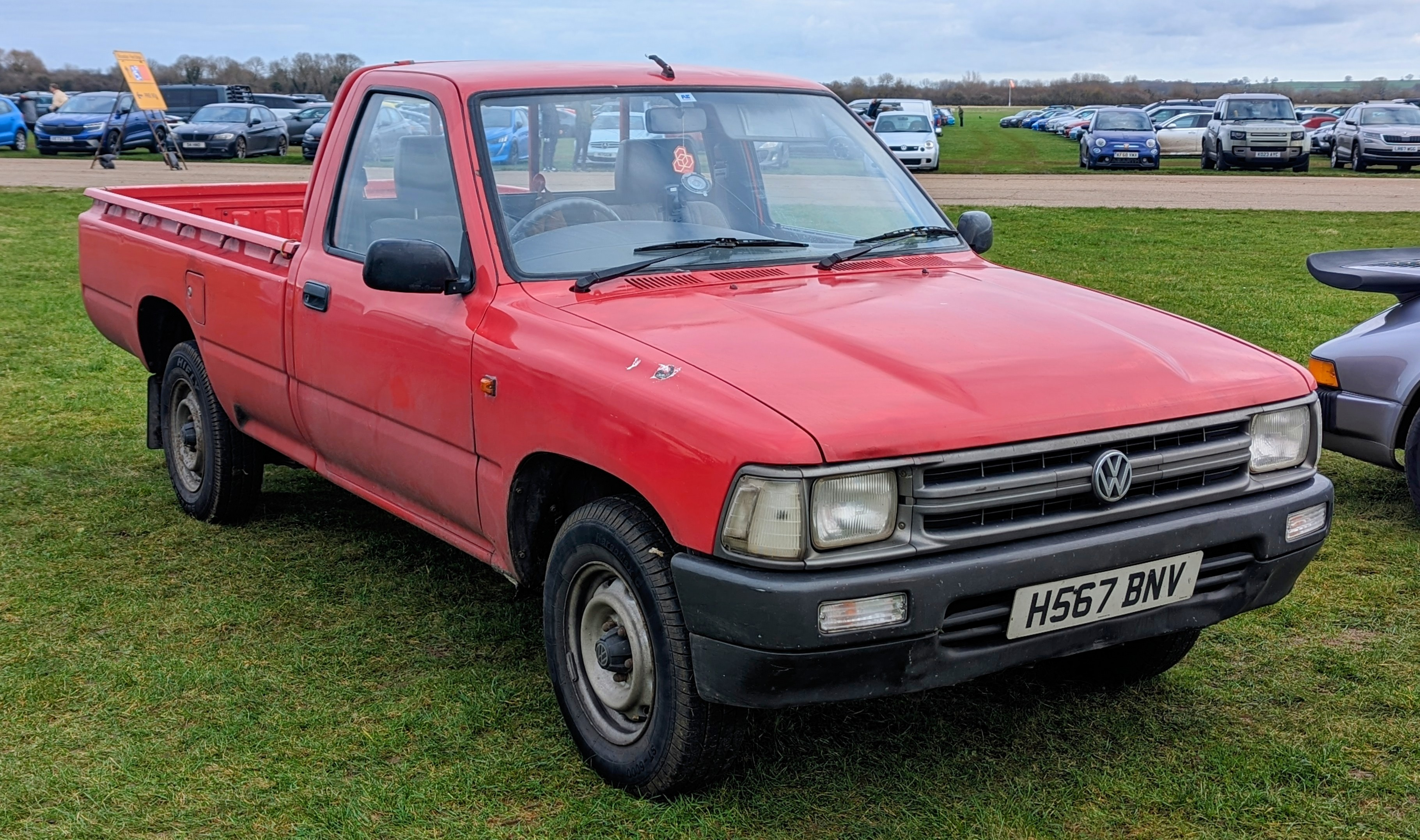
Volkswagen Taro 2WD

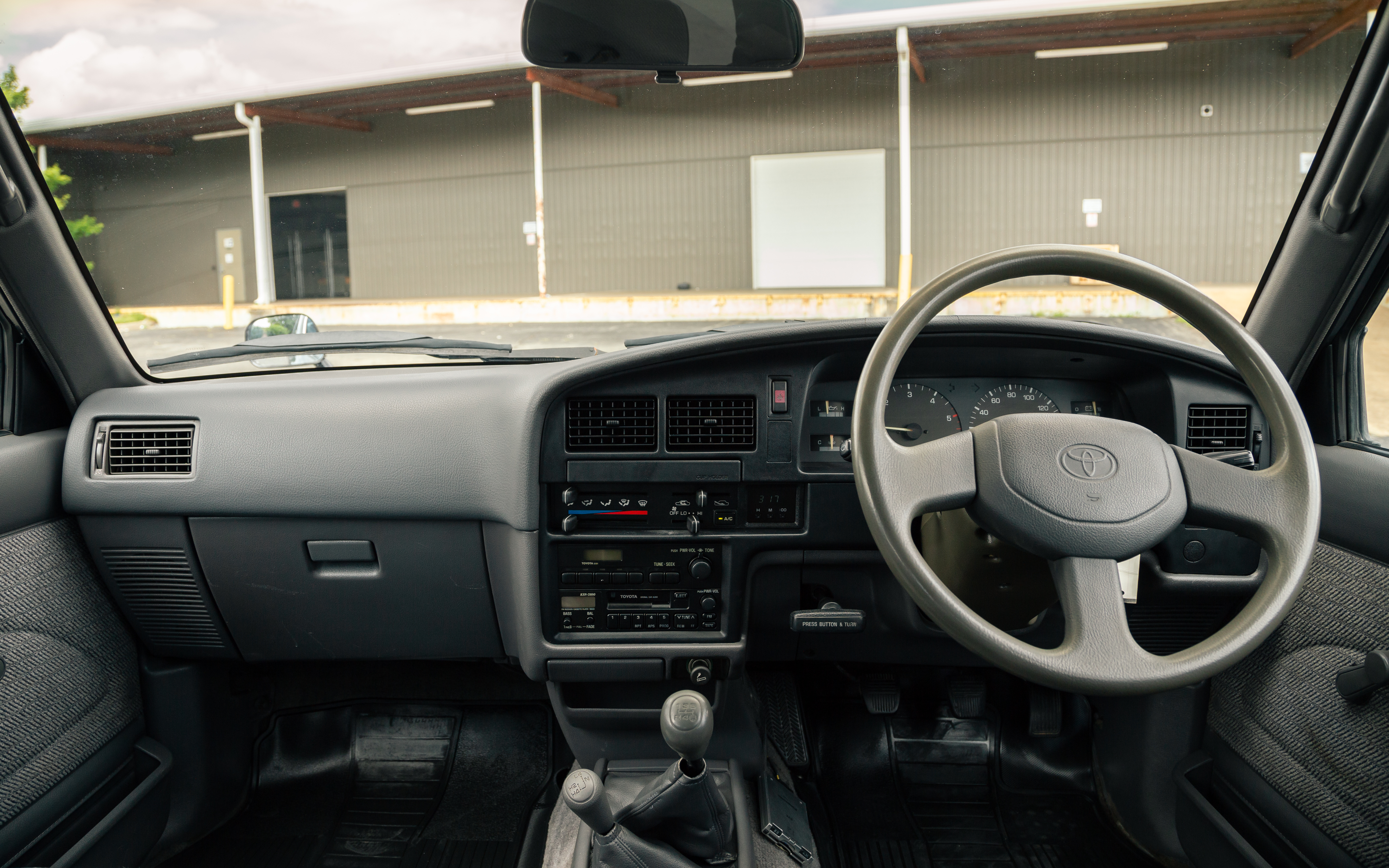
Interior

=== Engines ===
- 1988–1995: 1.8 L (1,812 cc) 2Y-U I4, 58 kW (79 PS; 78 hp) at 5,000rpm 140 N⋅m (100 lb⋅ft) at 3,200rpm
- 1988–1995: 1.8 L (1,812 cc) 2Y I4, 61 kW (83 PS; 82 hp) at 4,800rpm 140 N⋅m (100 lb⋅ft) at 2,800rpm (export markets)
- 1989–1997: 2.4 L (2,366 cc) 22R SOHC I4, 81 kW (110 PS; 109 hp) at 5,000 rpm and 187 N⋅m (138 lb⋅ft) at 3,400 rpm
- 1989–1997: 2.4 L (2,366 cc) 22R-E SOHC EFI I4, 84 kW (114 PS; 113 hp) at 4,600 rpm and 192 N⋅m (142 lb⋅ft) at 3,400 rpm
- 1989–1995: 3.0 L (2,958 cc) 3VZ-E V6, 112 kW (152 PS; 150 hp) at 4,800 rpm
- 1989–1997: 2.4 L (2,446 cc) 2L-II diesel I4, 66 kW (90 PS; 89 hp) at 4,200 rpm and 167 N⋅m (123 lb⋅ft) at 2,400 rpm
- 2.8 L (2,779 cc) 3L diesel I4, 67 kW (91 PS; 90 hp) at 4,000 rpm and 188 N⋅m (139 lb⋅ft) at 2,400 rpm

=== Sales in South America ===
- Colombia, Ecuador and Venezuela: the Hilux was produced in Colombia from 1993 to 1997 by the Sofasa company equipped with the 22R-E 2.4 L petrol engine. For these markets the model number for the 4WD double cabin was RN106.
- For sales in Argentina, Brazil, and Uruguay, the Hilux was produced in Argentina from March 1997 (Zárate Plant – both petrol and diesel engines). In 2001, the truck received a fourth facelift that was exclusively made in Argentina, which was also rebranded as the N200 series (3.0 L diesel engines – 1KZ-TE KZ205 4WD and 5L LN200 2WD/LN205 4WD – and 2.7 L 3RZ-FE petrol engine RZ200 2WD). The RZ200 model was also sold in Mexico from 2004 to 2005 when Toyota returned to the Mexican market in 2002, making it the only market in North America that received the N200 series.
- For sales in Bolivia, Chile, Paraguay and Peru, the Hilux was imported from factories in Japan from 1989 to 1997 (petrol and diesel engines).

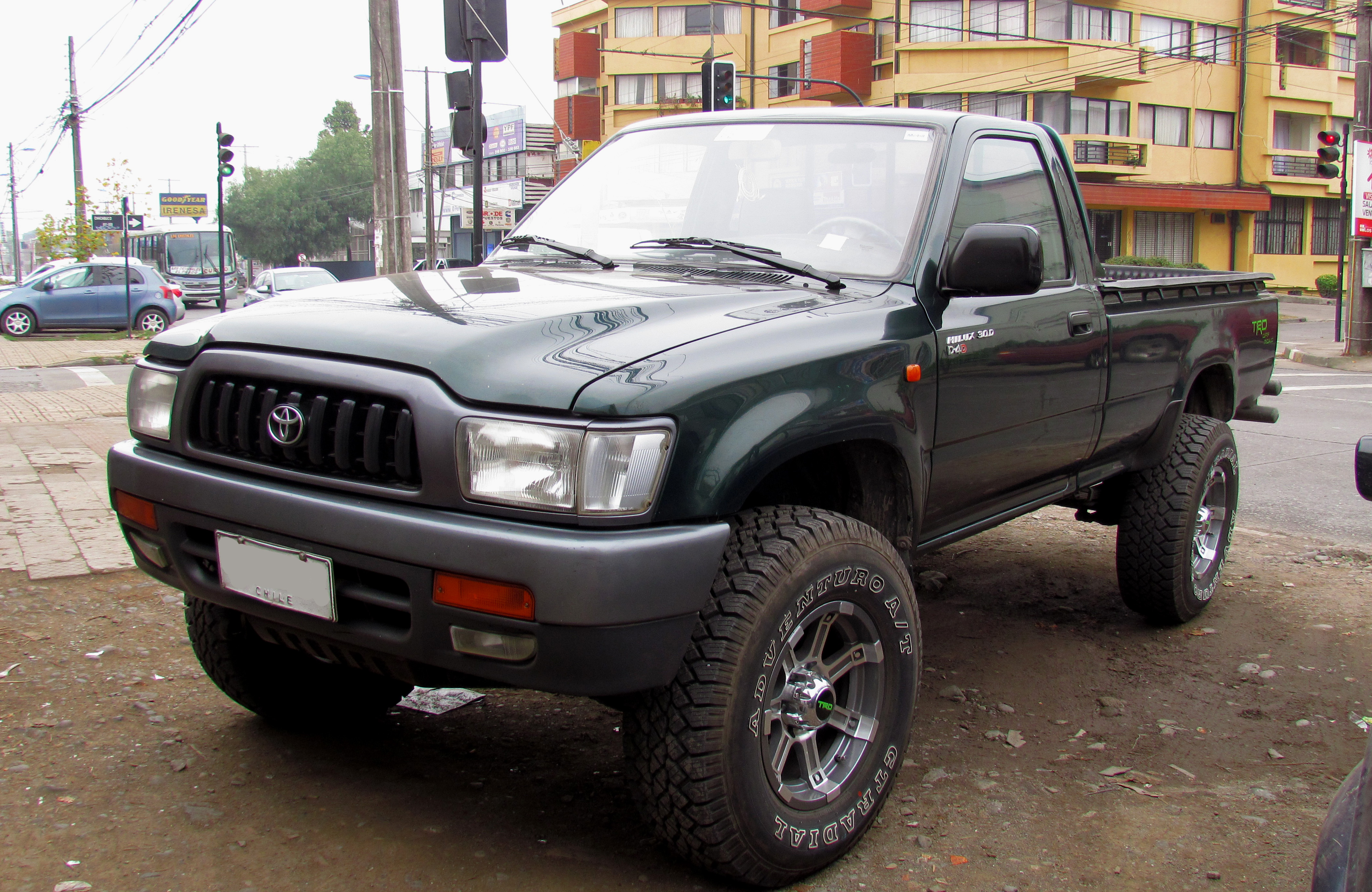
2001–2005 Toyota Hilux N200 series made by Toyota Argentina

The available options for these markets were:

- Single cab chassis (2WD, 4WD, petrol engines) (Colombia and Ecuador)
- Single cab long bed (2WD, 4WD, petrol and diesel engines - all South American markets; diesel engine not available in Colombia, Ecuador, and Venezuela)
- Xtracab (2WD, 4WD, petrol - only Bolivia)
- Double cab (2WD, 4WD, petrol and diesel engines - all South American markets; Diesel engine not available in Colombia, Ecuador, and Venezuela)

=== North America ===
In North America, the Hilux continued to be sold simply as the "Toyota Truck". A wide range of models were available (excluding the double cab model available internationally), mixing four- and six-cylinder engines, long and short beds, regular and Xtracabs, manual and automatic transmissions, and two- or four-wheel-drive. The cargo capacity was typically 1,640 lb (744 kg) for two-wheel drives and 1,400 lb (635 kg) for four-wheel drive models. GVWRs ranged from 2,565 to 5,350 lb (1,163 to 2,427 kg). Initially only imported from Japan, NUMMI-built trucks began appearing in 1990, however some trucks sold in the United States during the 1991 through 1995 model years were still manufactured in Japan as not all versions were built in California. The VIN on NUMMI-made trucks began with '4T' while Japanese-made ones started with 'JT'.

While the fifth generation Hilux continued to be sold elsewhere in the world until 1997, in North America it was replaced by the new Tacoma after an abbreviated 1995 model year.

== Sixth generation (N140, N150, N160, N170, N190; 1997) ==
Sixth generation
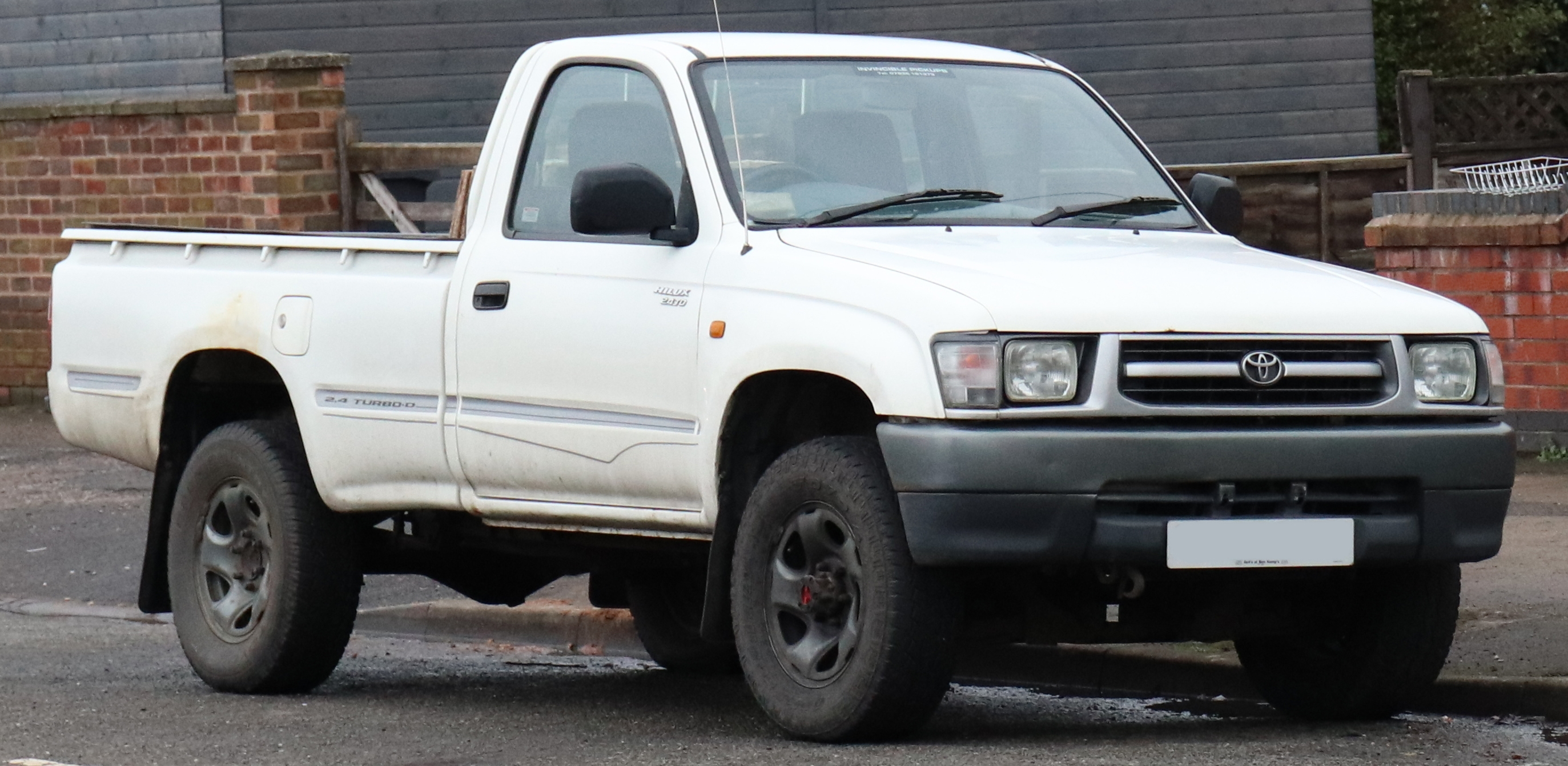
- 1997–2001 Toyota HiLux 4WD (LN165)

Overview
- Model code: N140 (2WD SWB/MWB); N150 (2WD LWB); N160 (4WD MWB); N170 (4WD LWB); N190 (2WD MWB Prerunner)
- Also called: Toyota Stout II (2WD single cab, Ecuador)
- Production: August 1997–March 2006
- Assembly: Japan: Hamura, Tokyo (Hino); Malaysia: Shah Alam; Thailand: Samut Prakan (TMT); South Africa: Prospecton (TSAM); Colombia: Envigado (Sofasa); Pakistan: Karachi (IMC); Venezuela: Cumaná
- Designer: Masaaki Ishiko

Body and chassis
- Body style: 2-door pickup truck; 4-door pickup truck
- Layout: Front-engine, rear-wheel-drive; Front-engine, four-wheel-drive
- Related: Toyota Tacoma (N140/N150/N160/N170/N190); Toyota 4Runner/Hilux Surf (N180); Toyota Kijang (F60/F70/F80)

Powertrain
- Engine: Petrol: 1.8 L 2Y I4 (YN140); 2.0 L 1RZ I4 (RZN142/147); 2.0 L 1RZ-E I4 (RZN147/152/167); 2.4 L 2RZ-FE I4 (RZN148/168/173/193); 2.7 L 3RZ-F I4 (RZN144/149/154/169); 2.7 L 3RZ-FE I4 (RZN144/149/154/169/174/194); 3.4 L 5VZ-FE V6 (VZN167/172); Diesel: 2.4 L 2L I4 (LN140/145/150/155); 2.4 L 2L-T turbodiesel I4 (LN165/170/190); 2.4 L 2L-TE turbodiesel I4 (LN165/170); 2.5 L 2KD-FTV turbodiesel I4 (KDN145/150/155/165/170/190); 2.8 L 3L I4 (LN141/146/166/171/191); 3.0 L 1KD-FTV turbodiesel I4 (KDN151/166); 3.0 L 5L, 5L-E I4 (LN147/152/157/167/172/192); 3.0 L 1KZ-TE turbodiesel I4 (KZN165/190)
- Transmission: 5-speed manual R151F; 5-speed manual W56; 5-speed manual G58; 4-speed automatic A340F

Dimensions
- Wheelbase: 2,615 mm (103.0 in) (2WD SWB); 2,850 mm (112.2 in) (2WD MWB); 2,855 mm (112.4 in) (4WD MWB, Japan); 2,860 mm (112.6 in) (4WD MWB); 2,960 mm (116.5 in) (2WD LWB, Thailand); 3,085 mm (121.5 in) (2WD LWB Xtracab); 3,090 mm (121.7 in) (4WD LWB Xtracab)
- Length: 4,650–4,840 mm (183.1–190.6 in) (regular cab); 4,690–4,915 mm (184.6–193.5 in) (double cab); 4,730–5,035 mm (186.2–198.2 in) (Xtracab)
- Width: 1,665–1,700 mm (65.6–66.9 in) (2WD); 1,690–1,790 mm (66.5–70.5 in) (4WD)
- Height: 1,580–1,640 mm (62.2–64.6 in) (2WD); 1,760–1,800 mm (69.3–70.9 in) (4WD)
- Curb weight: 1,270–1,585 kg (2,800–3,495 lb) (2WD); 1,410–1,830 kg (3,110–4,035 lb) (4WD)

The sixth-generation Hilux was introduced in late 1997, marking the first time the Xtracab model became available in Japan. The truck was powered primarily by RZ series four-cylinder petrol engines, with additional L series diesel engine options carried over from the previous generation. A 3.0-litre 5L diesel engine was added in 1998 and later upgraded to the fuel-injected 5L-E in 2000 for markets outside Japan. Additionally, a 3.0-litre 1KZ-TE turbodiesel engine was introduced in 1999, exclusively for right-hand drive markets such as Australia, Thailand, and South Africa.

The truck underwent a facelift in 2001 for the 2002 model year, featuring a more rounded fascia. The Prerunner package (N190 series) — a medium-wheelbase rear-wheel-drive model equipped with the suspension setup from the four-wheel-drive variant — became available for the first time. For the European, Thai, and Malaysian markets, the turbodiesel engines were replaced by the DOHC KD series turbodiesel engines. Additionally, the V6 engine made a comeback in 2002 with the arrival of the 3.4-litre 5VZ-FE engine, though it was offered exclusively for the Australian four-wheel-drive models.

In 2004, Toyota ceased production of the Hilux truck for the Japanese market, however it remained in production for export markets for a few years. This was the last generation of the Hilux to be built in Japan; production for international markets was moved to Thailand starting in 2004.

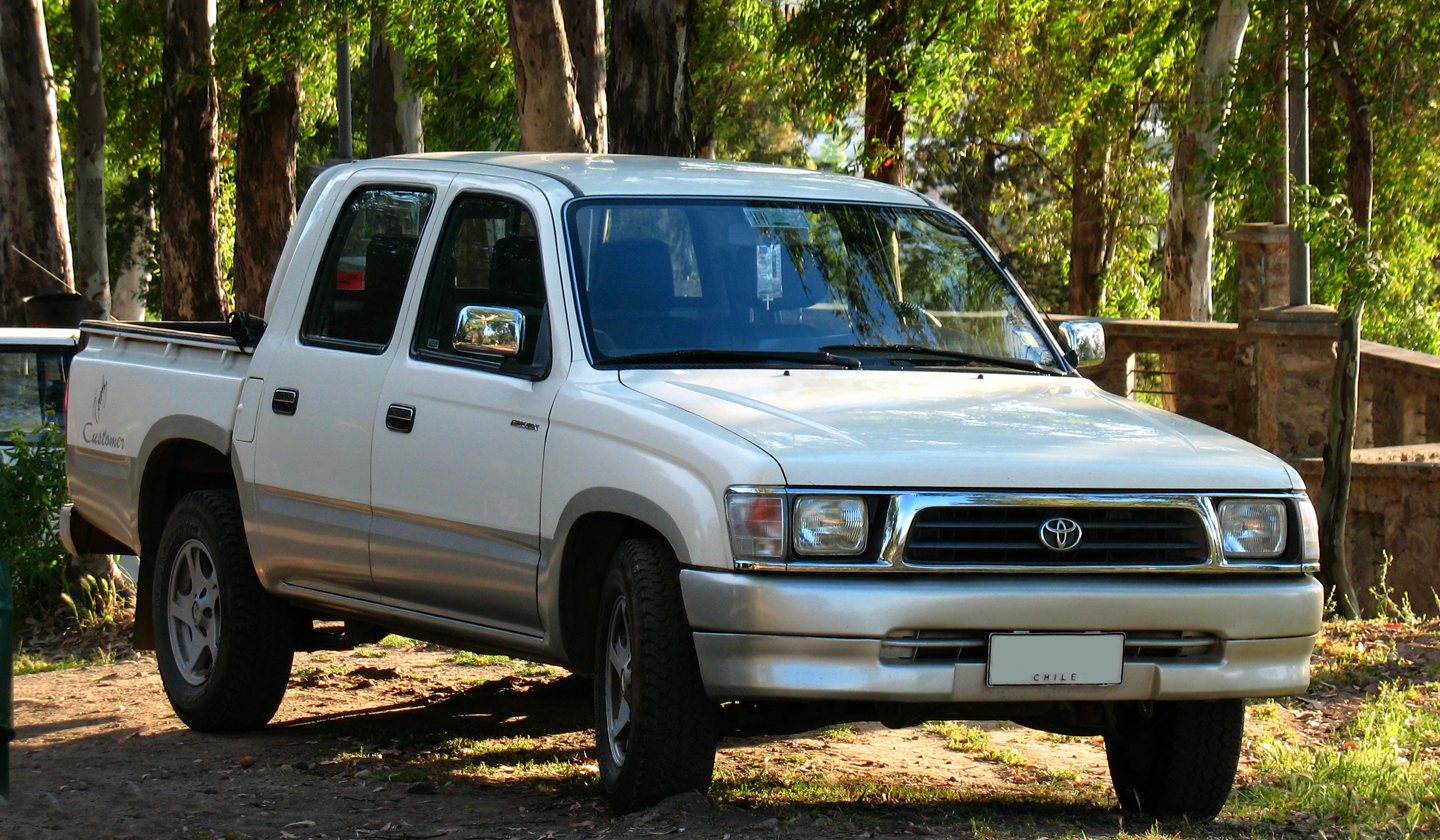
1997–2001 Toyota Hilux double cab 2WD

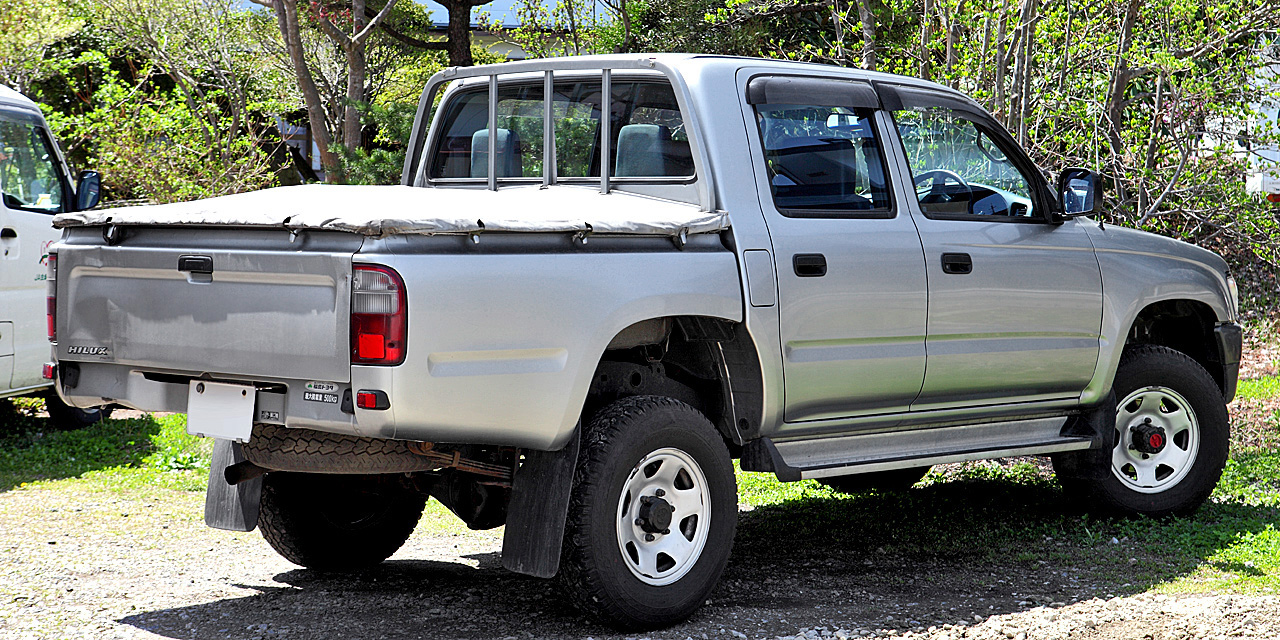
1997–2001 Toyota Hilux double cab 4WD

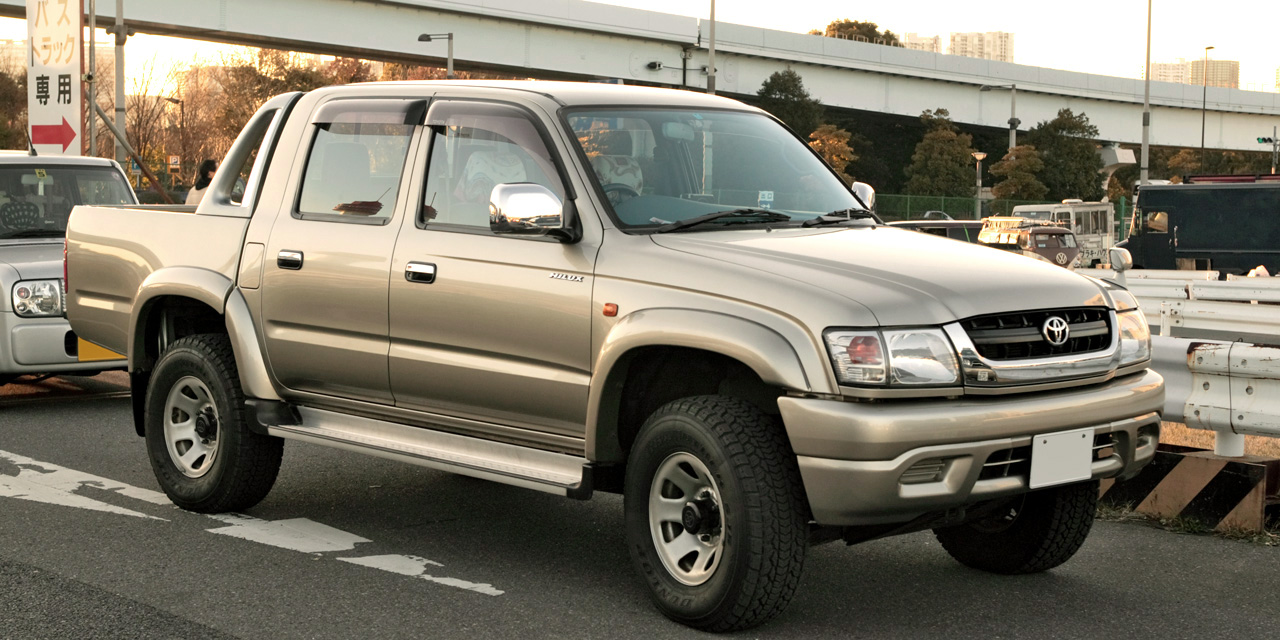
2001–2005 Toyota Hilux double cab 4WD

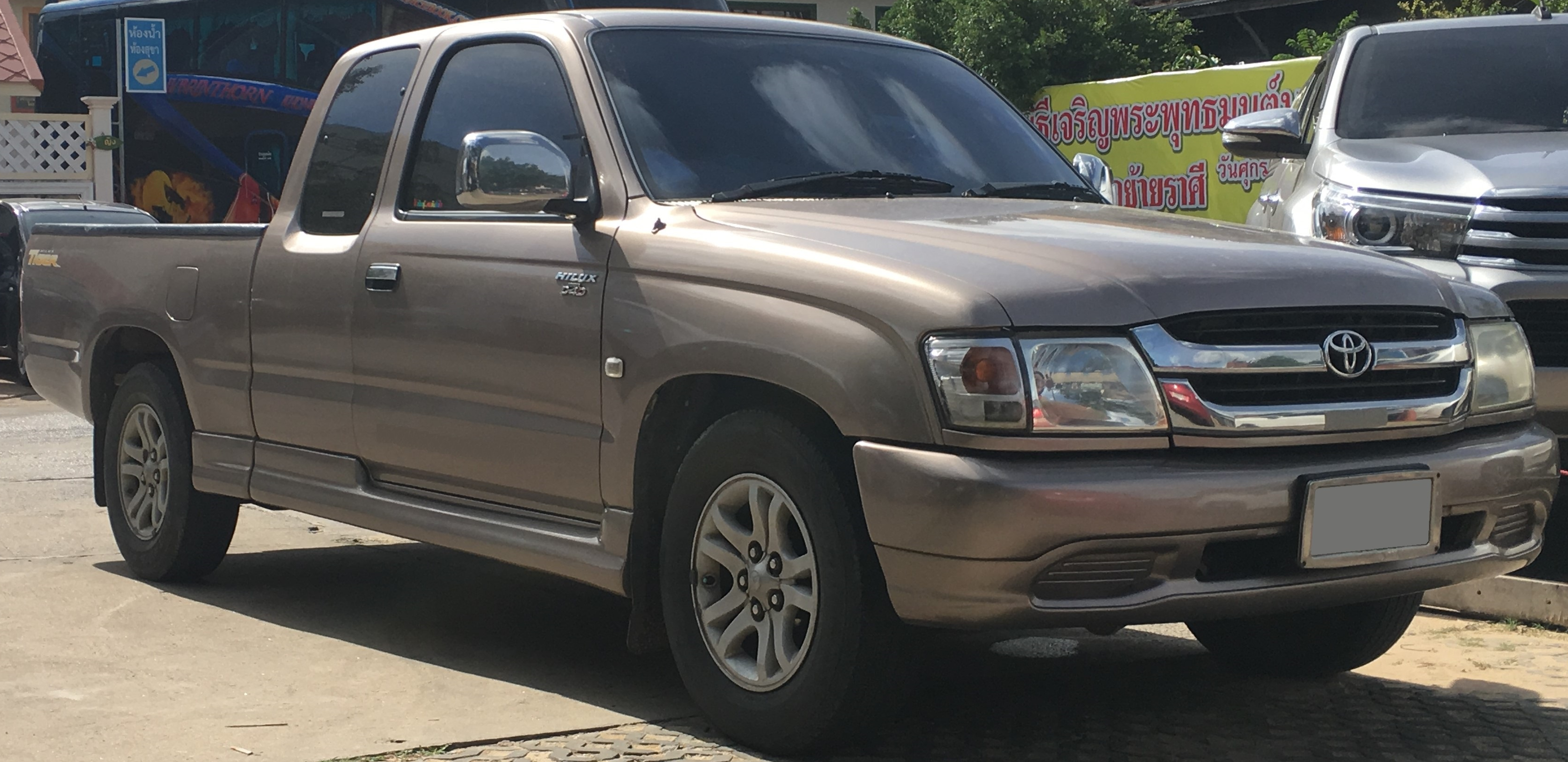
2001–2005 Toyota Hilux Xtracab 2WD

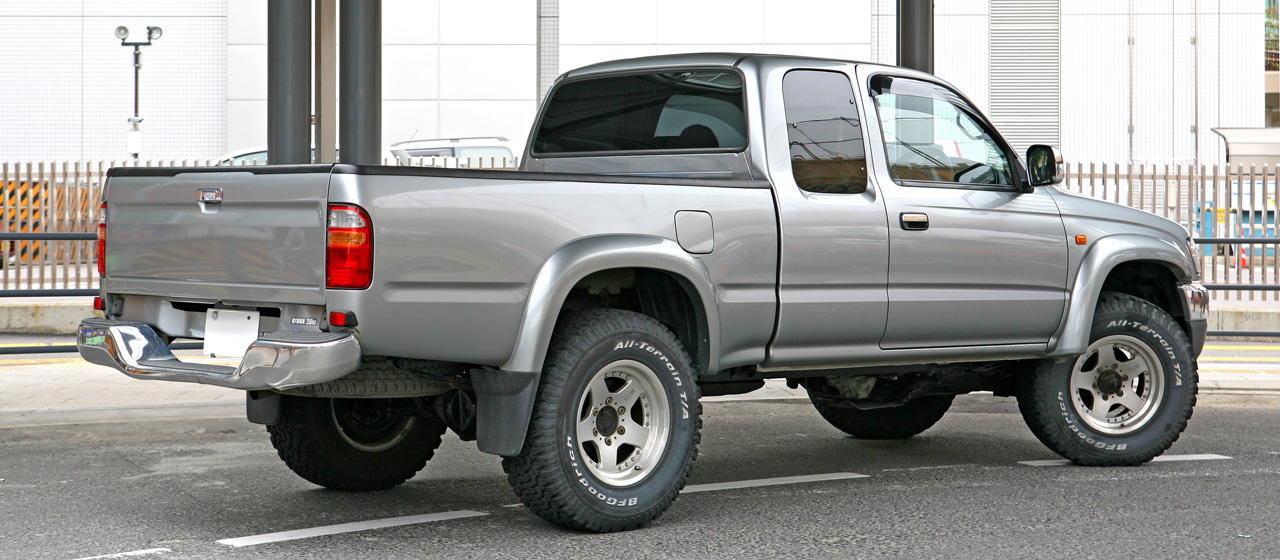
2001–2005 Toyota Hilux Xtracab 4WD

=== Engines ===
- 1998–2000 1.8 L (1,812 cc) 2Y 8-valve OHV I4 carb (South Africa only, 2WD)
- 1997–2006 2.0 L (1,998 cc) 1RZ 8-valve SOHC I4 carb (GCC, South Africa and general exports only, 2WD)
- 1997–2003 2.0 L (1,998 cc) 1RZ-E 8-valve SOHC I4 EFI, 81 kW (110 PS; 109 hp) (2WD/4WD – Japanese specification)
- 1997–2005 2.4 L (2,438 cc) 2RZ-FE 16-valve DOHC I4 EFI, 106 kW (144 PS; 142 hp) (2WD/4WD)
- 1997–2005 2.4 L (2,446 cc) 2L 8-valve SOHC diesel I4, 55 kW (75 PS; 74 hp) (Thailand, South Africa, Europe (until 2001) and general exports only, 2WD – UK specification)
- 1997–2001 2.4 L (2,446 cc) 2L-T 8-valve SOHC turbodiesel I4, 66 kW (90 PS; 89 hp) (Europe only, 2WD/4WD – UK specification)
- 1997–1999 2.4 L (2,446 cc) 2L-TE 8-valve SOHC turbodiesel I4 EFI, 71 kW (97 PS; 95 hp) (Japan only, 4WD)
- 2001–2005 2.5 L (2,494 cc) 2KD-FTV 16-valve DOHC turbodiesel I4 D-4D, 75 kW (102 PS; 101 hp) (Europe, Thailand and Malaysia only, 2WD/4WD – Thai specification)
- 1997–2001 2.7 L (2,693 cc) 3RZ-F 16-valve DOHC I4 carb, 102 kW (139 PS; 137 hp) (GCC and general exports only, 2WD/4WD)
- 1997–2005 2.7 L (2,693 cc) 3RZ-FE 16-valve DOHC I4, 115 kW (156 PS; 154 hp) (2WD/4WD – GCC specification)
- 1997–2005 2.8 L (2,779 cc) 3L 8-valve SOHC diesel I4, 69 kW (94 PS; 93 hp) (GCC and general exports only, 2WD/4WD – GCC specificatios)
- 1999–2005 3.0 L (2,982 cc) 1KZ-TE 8-valve SOHC turbodiesel I4 EFI, 85 kW (116 PS; 114 hp) (Australia, South Africa and Thailand only 2WD/4WD, – Thai specification)
- 2002–2004 3.0 L (2,982 cc) 1KD-FTV 16-valve DOHC turbodiesel I4 D-4D, 92 kW (125 PS; 123 hp) (Thailand only, 2WD/4WD)
- 1997–2004 3.0 L (2,986 cc) 5L 8-valve SOHC diesel I4, 67 kW (91 PS; 90 hp) (Japan (until 2004), Australia, South Africa and Thailand only, 2WD/4WD – Japanese specification)
- 2000–2005 3.0 L (2,986 cc) 5L-E 8-valve SOHC diesel I4 EFI, 71 kW (97 PS; 95 hp) (Australia, South Africa and Thailand only 2WD/4WD, – Thai specification)
- 2002–2004 3.4 L (3,378 cc) 5VZ-FE 24-valve DOHC V6, 142 kW (193 PS; 190 hp) (Australia only, 4WD)

South American markets

The Hilux was produced in Colombia for sales in Colombia, Venezuela, and Ecuador from 1998 to 2005 by the SOFASA company (with only 2.4-litre and 2.7-litre petrol engines). In Ecuador, the single-cab 2WD chassis/long bed is called the Stout II. For sales in Bolivia, Chile, Paraguay, Peru, it was imported from Japan from 1998 through 2004 (2.7-litre petrol engine, and 2.8-litre diesel engine). This model was not sold in Argentina, Brazil and Uruguay because the fifth-generation Hilux had received a redesign and upgrade (N200 series). Options for South American markets included:

- Single cab chassis (2WD, 4WD, petrol engines – for sales in Colombia and Ecuador)
- Single cab long bed (2WD, 4WD, petrol and diesel engines – all South American countries)
- Xtracab (4WD, petrol and diesel engines – in Bolivia only)
- Double cab (2WD, 4WD, petrol and diesel engines – all South American countries, named the Hilux Millennium from 2002 through to the present)

Thailand market

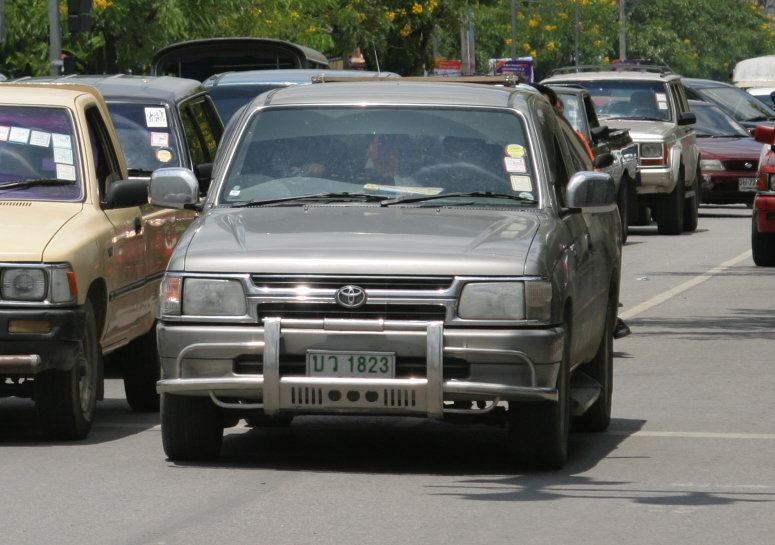
1998–2001 Thai market Toyota Hilux Tiger Xtracab 2WD

Toyota shifted production from the Hilux Mighty-X (fifth generation) to the Hilux Tiger (sixth generation) in 1998 and made it the global export hub. The pre-facelift models of Thai market Hilux Tiger 2WD (Xtracab only) and 4WD featured different fascias than the international markets version. There were also two exclusive models for local Thai market such as a longer wheelbase single cab rear-wheel-drive model and a Xtracab four-wheel-drive model built on the medium-wheelbase frame.

The Thailand-made Hilux Tiger went through the following versions:

- 1998–2004: Hilux Tiger with a 2.4 L 2L engine (2WD only)
- 1998–1999: Hilux Tiger with a 3.0 L 5L engine
- 2000–2002: Hilux Tiger with a 3.0 L 5L-E EFI engine
- 2000–2002: Hilux Tiger with a 3.0 L 1KZ-TE turbodiesel EFI engine
- late 2001 – late 2004: Hilux Tiger with a 2.5 L 2KD-FTV D-4D turbodiesel engines
- late 2002 – late 2004: Hilux SportCruiser with a 3.0 L 1KD-FTV D-4D turbodiesel engines

=== Sport Rider ===
Toyota Hilux Sport Rider
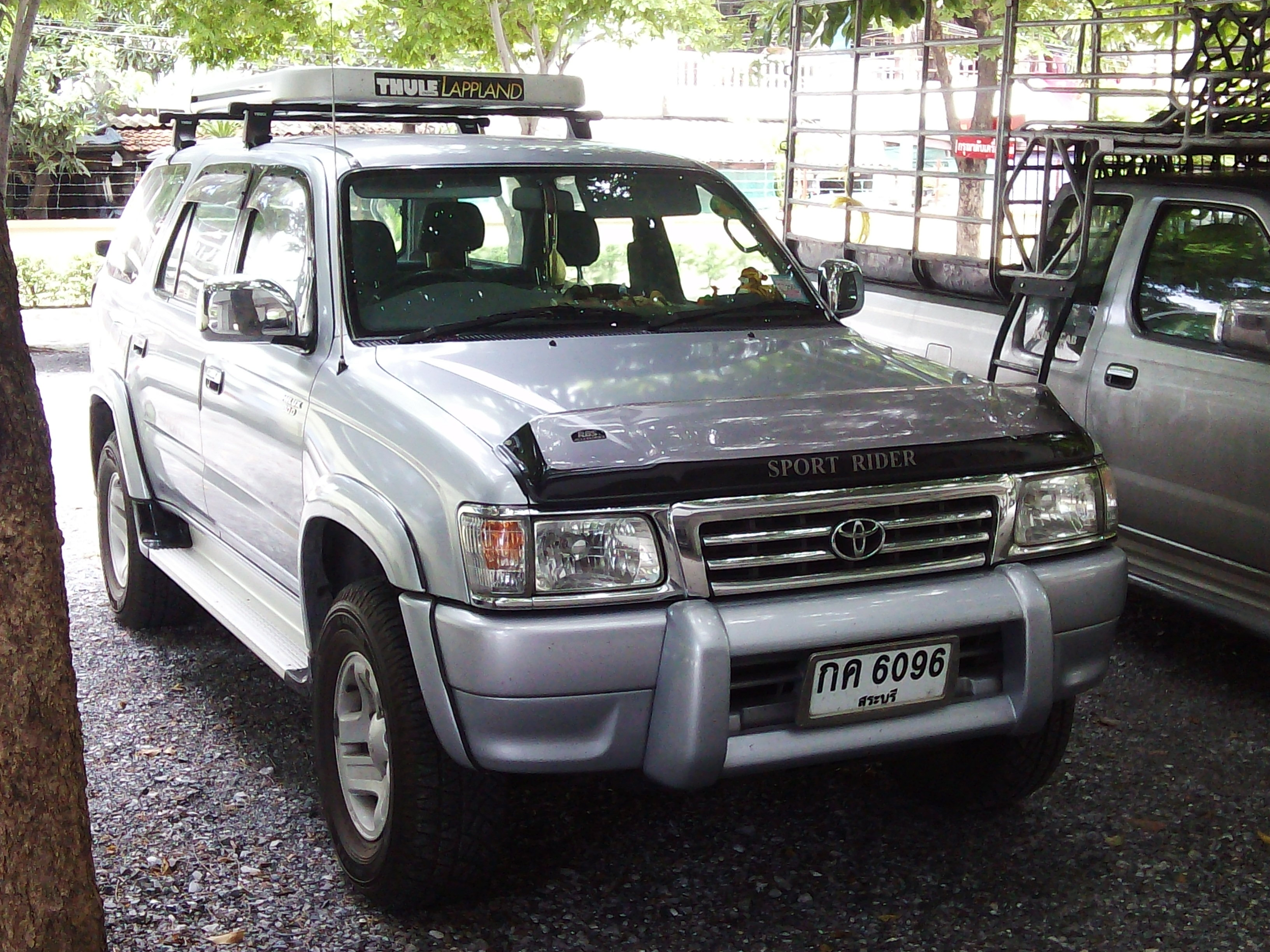
- 1998–2001 Hilux Sport Rider Prerunner (LN192)

Overview
- Model code: N160 (4WD); N190 (2WD Prerunner)
- Production: October 1998–November 2004
- Assembly: Thailand: Samut Prakan (Thai Auto Works Co.)

Body and chassis
- Body style: 5-door SUV
- Layout: Front-engine, rear-wheel-drive; Front-engine, four-wheel-drive
- Related: Toyota Tacoma (N140/N150/N160/N170/N190); Toyota 4Runner/Hilux Surf (N180); Toyota Kijang (F60/F70/F80)

Powertrain
- Engine: Diesel: 2.5 L 2KD-FTV turbodiesel I4 (KDN165/190); 3.0 L 1KD-FTV turbodiesel I4 (KDN166); 3.0 L 5L, 5L-E I4 (LN167/192); 3.0 L 1KZ-TE turbodiesel I4 (KZN165)
- Transmission: 5-speed manual; 4-speed automatic

Dimensions
- Wheelbase: 2,860 mm (112.6 in)
- Length: 4,590–4,985 mm (180.7–196.3 in) (1998–2002); 5,045 mm (198.6 in) (2002–2004)
- Width: 1,740–1,775 mm (68.5–69.9 in) (1998–2002); 1,790 mm (70.5 in) (2002–2004)
- Height: 1,775–1,795 mm (69.9–70.7 in) (1998–2002); 1,810 mm (71.3 in) (2002–2004)
- Curb weight: 1,730–1,820 kg (3,815–4,010 lb) (2WD); 1,875–1,935 kg (4,135–4,265 lb) (4WD)

Chronology
- Successor: Toyota Fortuner

Toyota introduced a mid-size SUV variant of the Hilux in 1998, called the Sport Rider. This variant was sold only in Thailand, where it was also built. In style and execution, the Sport Rider is similar to the 4Runner. The Sport Rider frame and suspension system are derived from the medium-wheelbase four-wheel-drive Hilux Tiger, including the Hilux's independent front suspension and leaf-sprung rear suspension. The vehicles began as four-door pickup trucks and were then modified into wagons on arrival in Thailand by Thai Auto Works Co (a majority Thai-owned company in which Toyota has a 20 percent stake) and distributed by Toyota Tsusho Thailand to Toyota dealers in the country.

The Sport Rider was available with the 3.0-litre 5L engine and a 5-speed manual transmission only, There was a choice of PreRunner (2WD) or 4WD model. Toyota introduced the first facelift in 2000, the 3.0-litre 5L engine was replaced by the 3.0-litre 5L-E engines, added the 3.0-litre 1KZ-TE turbodiesel engine for the 4WD model, a new front bumper with integrated foglamps.

In 2002, Toyota introduced a second facelift, the 3.0-litre 5L-E engines was replaced by the 2.5-litre 2KD-FTV engine, a 4-speed automatic transmission was added to the PreRunner (2WD) model, a new front bumper, a new grille, new projector-style headlights, and new rear lamps. In 2003, the 3.0-litre 1KZ-TE turbodiesel engine was replaced by the 3.0-litre 1KD-FTV engine, a 4-speed automatic transmission was added to the 4WD model Toyota discontinued the Sport Rider in 2004 and replaced it with the Fortuner in 2005.

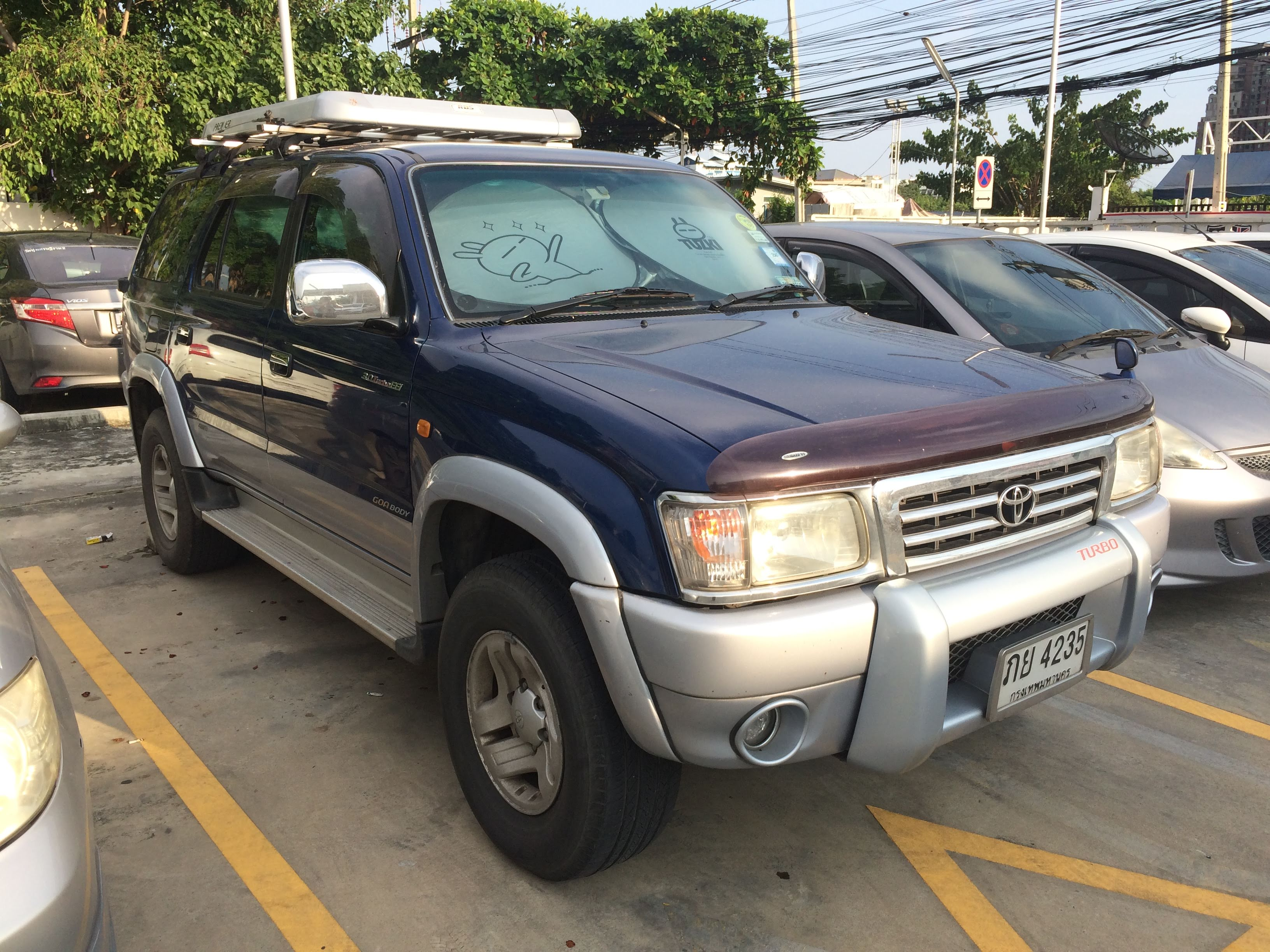
2001–2002 Hilux Sport Rider SR5 Limited 4WD

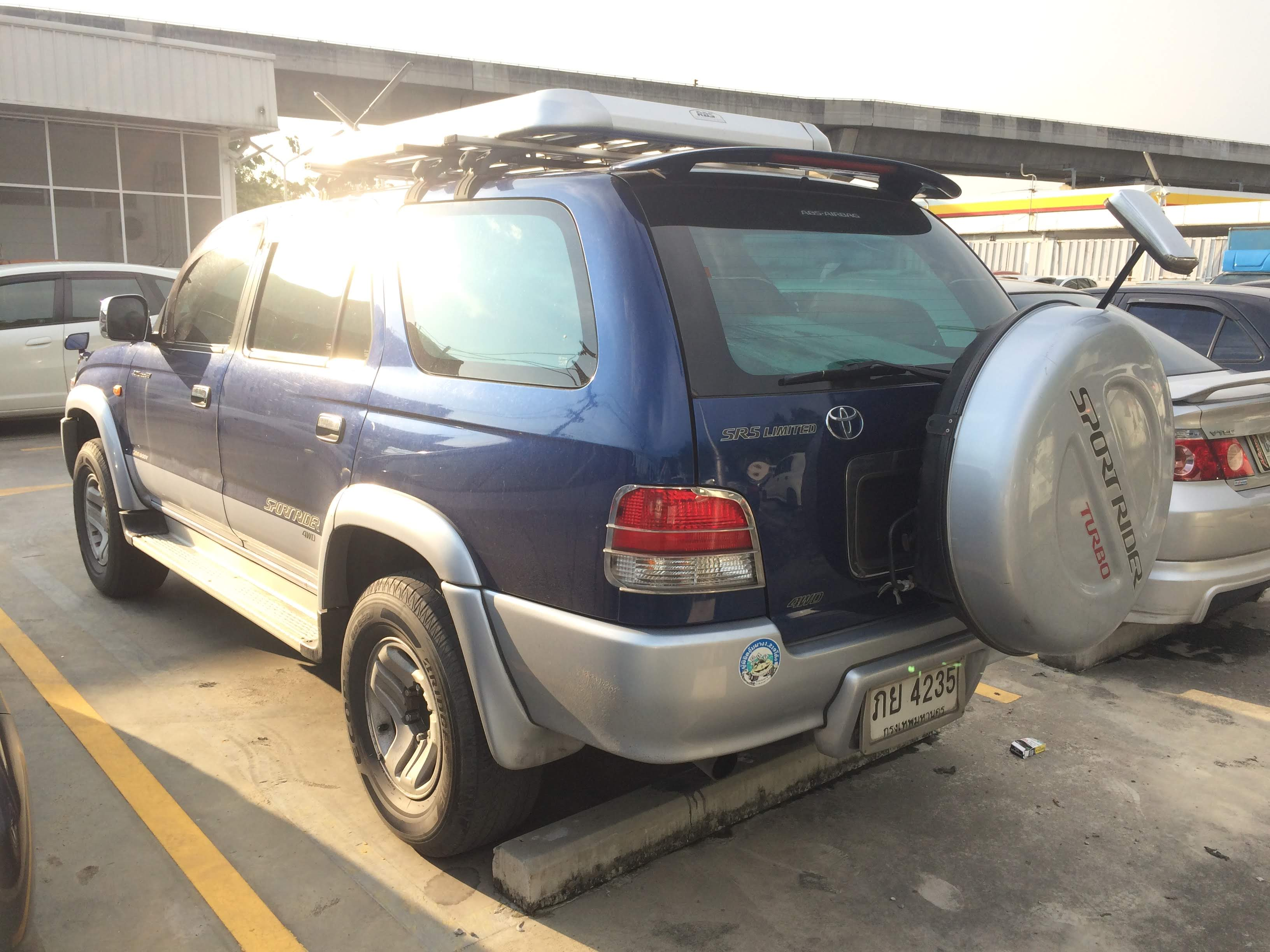
Rear view of the 1998–2002 model

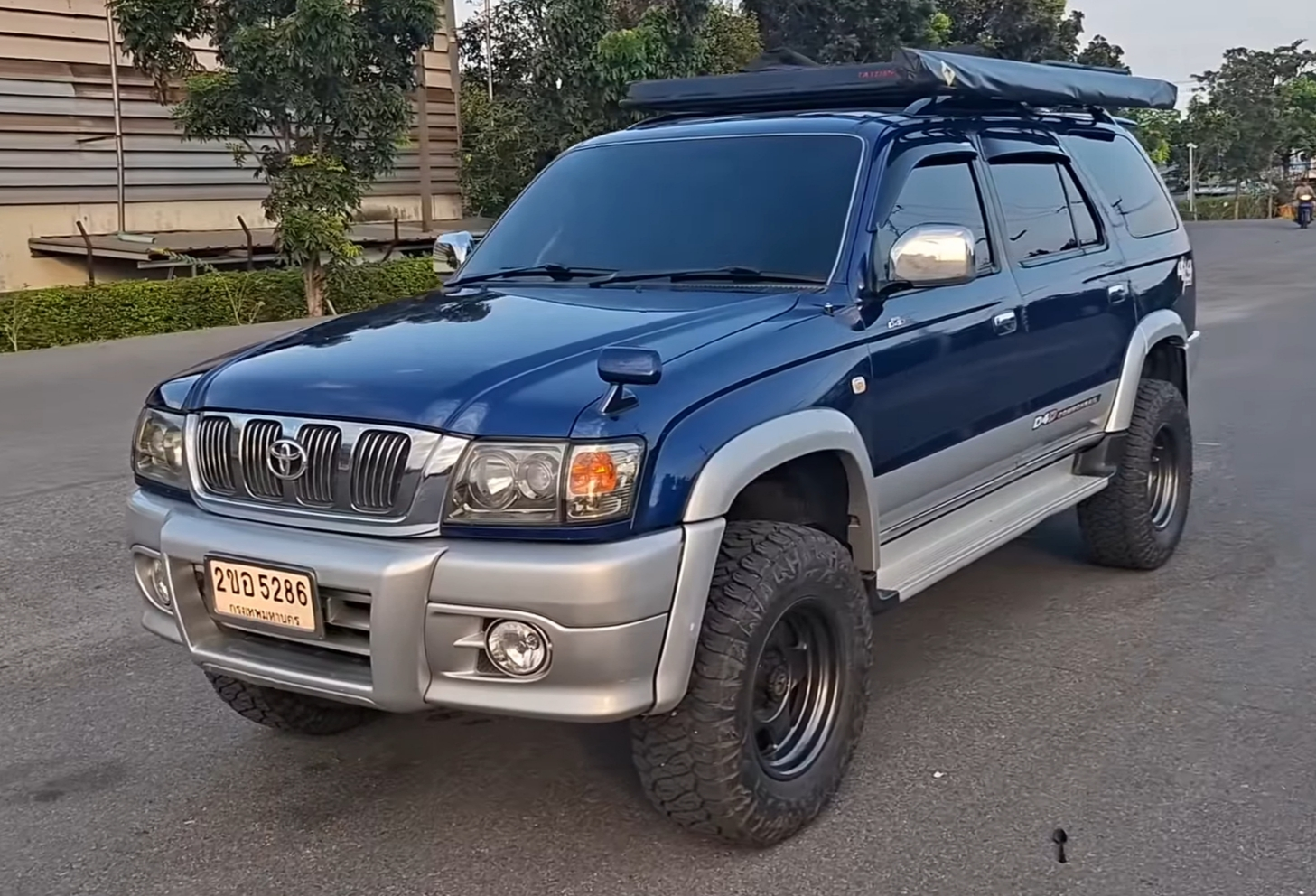
2002–2004 Toyota Hilux Sport Rider S 4WD

=== Engines ===
- 1998–2000: 3.0 L (2,986 cc) 5L 8-valve SOHC I4, 66 kW (90 PS; 89 hp) at 4,000 rpm 192 N⋅m (142 lb⋅ft) at 2,400 rpm (ECC net)
- 2000–2002: 3.0 L (2,986 cc) 5L-E I4 8-valve SOHC EFI, 71 kW (97 PS; 95 hp) at 4,000 rpm 200 N⋅m (150 lb⋅ft) at 2,600 rpm (ECC net)
- 2000–2002: 3.0 L (2,982 cc) 1KZ-TE I4 8-valve SOHC EFI turbodiesel, 85 kW (116 PS; 114 hp) at 3,600 rpm and 315 N⋅m (232 lb⋅ft) at 2,000 rpm (ECC net)
- late 2001–2004: 2.5 L (2,494 cc) 2KD-FTV I4 16-valve DOHC D-4D turbodiesel, 75 kW (102 PS; 101 hp) at 3,600 rpm and 260 N⋅m (190 lb⋅ft) at 1,400–3,400 rpm (ECC net)
- late 2002–2004: 3.0 L (2,982 cc) 1KD-FTV I4 16-valve DOHC D-4D turbodiesel, 92 kW (125 PS; 123 hp) at 4,800 rpm and 315 N⋅m (232 lb⋅ft) at 1,800–2,600 rpm (ECC net)

== Seventh generation (AN10, AN20, AN30; 2004) ==
Seventh generation
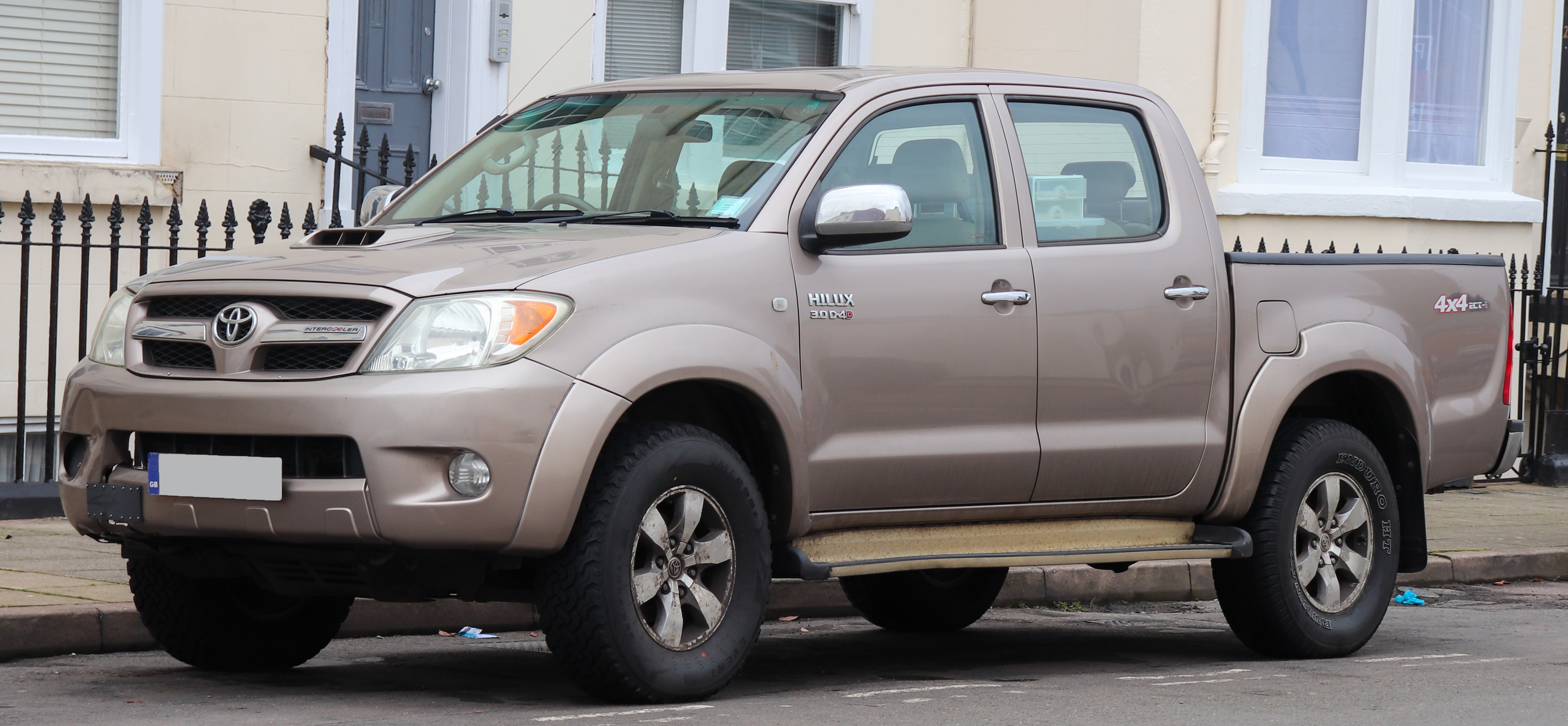
- 2005 Toyota Hilux pre-facelift (KUN26R)

Overview
- Model code: AN10 (2WD); AN20 (4WD); AN30 (2WD Prerunner)
- Also called: TruckMasters OX (Finland)
- Production: August 2004 – May 2015
- Assembly: Argentina: Zárate, Buenos Aires (TASA); Malaysia: Shah Alam; Pakistan: Karachi (IMC); South Africa: Prospecton (TSAM); Thailand: Ban Pho; Samrong Tai (TMT); Venezuela: Cumaná
- Designer: Satoru Oya, Yoshikazu Harada and Takumi Nakamura

Body and chassis
- Body style: 2-door pickup truck; 4-door pickup truck
- Layout: Front-engine, rear-wheel-drive; Front-engine, four-wheel-drive
- Platform: Toyota IMV
- Related: Toyota Fortuner (AN50/AN60); Toyota Innova (AN40)

Powertrain
- Engine: Petrol: 2.0 L 1TR-FE VVT-i I4; 2.7 L 2TR-FE VVT-i I4; 4.0 L 1GR-FE VVT-i V6; 4.0 L 1GR-FE supercharged VVT-i V6; Petrol/CNG: 2.7 L 2TR-FE VVT-i I4; Diesel: 2.4 L 2L-T/2L-TE; 2.5 L 2KD-FTV D-4D Turbodiesel I4 (102 hp: non-intercooler, 120 hp: intercooler); 2.5 L 2KD-FTV D-4D VN-Turbo I4; 3.0 L 1KD-FTV D-4D turbocharged I4
- Transmission: 5-speed manual; 4-speed automatic; 5-speed A750F automatic

Dimensions
- Wheelbase: 3,085 mm (121.5 in)
- Length: Single Cab: 4,980 mm (196.1 in); Xtra Cab: 5,135–5,260 mm (202.2–207.1 in); Double Cab: 4,980–5,260 mm (196.1–207.1 in)
- Width: Single Cab: 1,760 mm (69.3 in); Xtra and Double Cab: 1,885 mm (74.2 in)
- Height: Single Cab (2WD): 1,795 mm (70.7 in); Single Cab (4WD): 1,810 mm (71.3 in); Xtra and Double Cab (2WD): 1,695 mm (66.7 in); Xtra and Double Cab (4WD): 1,810 mm (71.3 in)
- Curb weight: 1,450–1,920 kg (3,200–4,230 lb)

The seventh-generation Hilux (designated the AN10/AN20/AN30), part of the IMV program led by chief engineer Kaoru Hosokawa, started production in Thailand during August 2004. Three pickup truck body variants were initially produced: a two-door Single Cab (referred to by Toyota as IMV1), a two-door Xtra Cab (IMV2), and four-door Double Cab (IMV3). In September 2008, Toyota introduced the Smart Cab, a four-door cab with hidden rear clamshell doors. The IMV program also spawned the Toyota Innova (AN40) minivan (IMV4) and Toyota Fortuner (AN50/AN60) SUV (IMV5).

Primarily developed in Thailand, it was the first generation of the Hilux to not be produced in Japan. Hilux models sold in Asian, European, Middle Eastern and Oceanian markets were initially built and assembled in Thailand with targeted annual production of 280,000 units, with 140,000 allocated for exports. Later, production was delegated to Malaysia and Southeast Asia in order to increase sales in those regions. In Thailand, the vehicle is called the Hilux Vigo. For other European markets and South Africa, the Hilux was built in Durban, South Africa. Hiluxes sold in Argentina and Brazil were built in Argentina, as with the previous generation Hilux.

The ladder frame chassis used by the seventh-generation Hilux is 45 percent stiffer compared to its predecessor. Combined with a reduction in the number of welded joints with the use of a unified inner frame, it has a higher torsional stiffness while the vertical rigidity is improved by stronger crossmembers. The model also used a new double wishbone front suspension which was said to improve stability and ride comfort.

The model is also considerably larger than the previous generation Hilux. For the double cab variant, the 2005 model is 400 mm (15.7 in) longer and 45 mm (1.8 in) wider. The deck is 165 mm (6.5 in) longer and both wider and taller by 50 mm (2.0 in). The increased size was achieved without a significant increase in the kerb weight. Drag coefficient is rated 0.36 (0.39 with over fenders), which was claimed to be "class-leading" during the time of its introduction.

In Singapore, the Hilux was available as a single cab with the 2.5 L engine or a double cab with the 3.0 L engine.

This generation of the Hilux was introduced for Argentina on 2 March 2005 in Buenos Aires with a market launch in April.

This generation of the Hilux was also sold in Finland as the TruckMasters OX by Truck Masters Finland. Because of a modified rear suspension, the truck is registered in Finland as a light truck. The OX was only available with a 3.0-litre D-4D diesel engine.

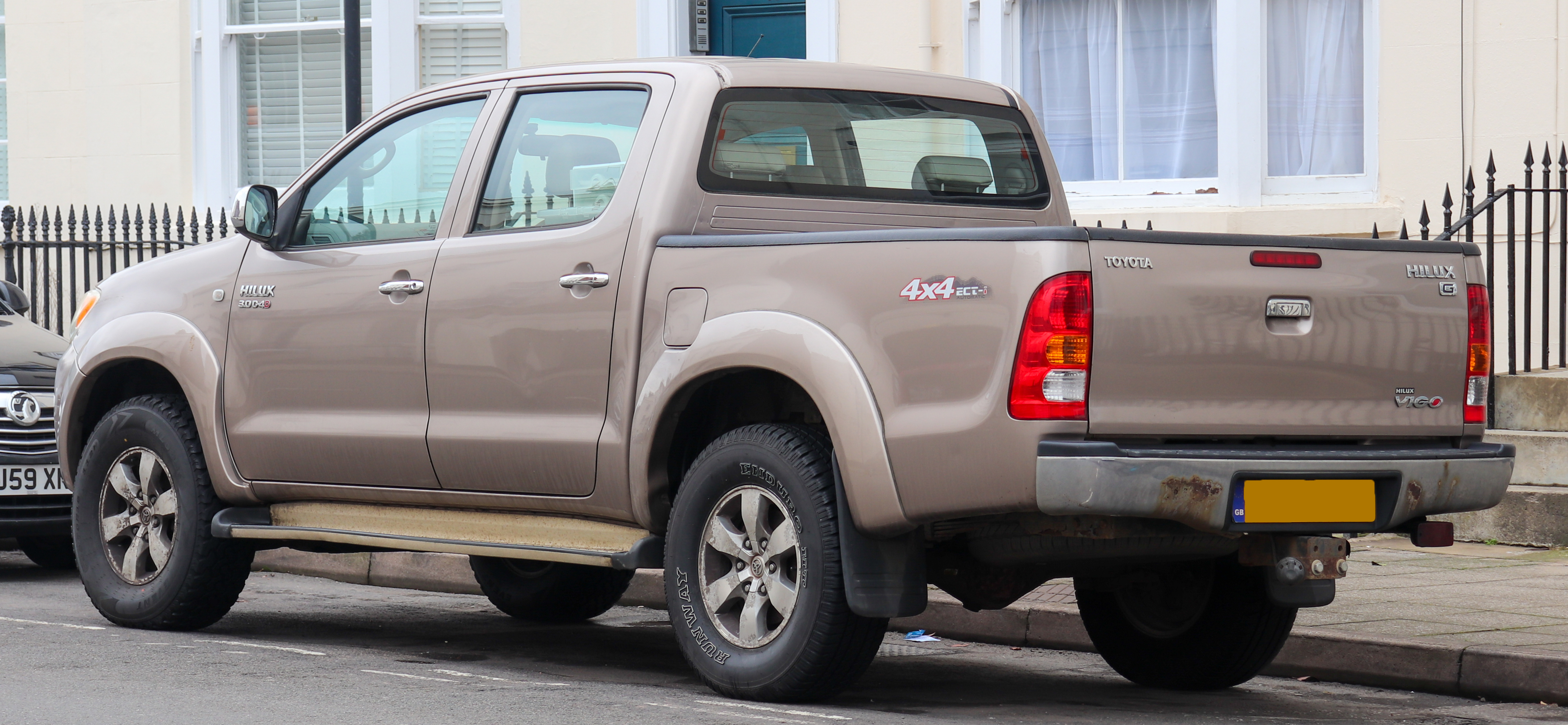
2005 pre-facelift Rear view

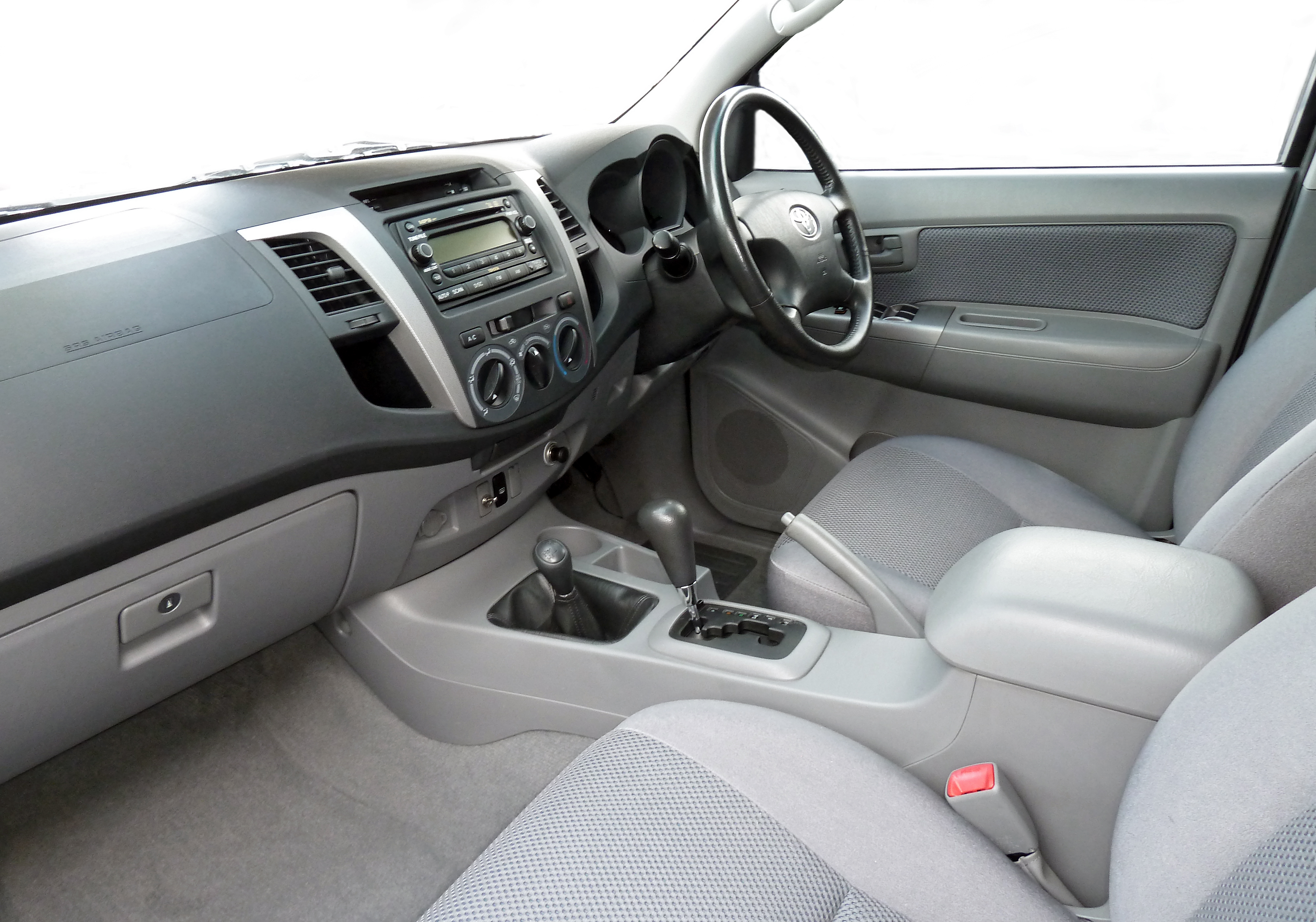
Interior

=== Engines ===
- 2005 2.0 L petrol VVT-i DOHC I4 (South Africa, Indonesia and Middle East) (TGN15)
- 2005 2.5 L diesel D-4D DOHC I4, Turbo-diesel 76 kW (103 PS; 102 hp) – 107 kW (145 PS; 143 hp) (Asia, Europe, South Africa, South America) (KUN15, KUN25, KUN35)
- 2005 2.7 L petrol VVT-i DOHC I4, 119 kW (162 PS; 160 hp) (Australia, Arabian Peninsula, Philippines, South Africa, Venezuela) (TGN16, TGN26)
- 2005 3.0 L diesel D-4D DOHC I4, Turbo-diesel, common rail 16-valve direct injection, 121 kW (165 PS; 162 hp) (Asia, South Africa, South America, Australia, Europe). This version is made at Toyota's facility in Zárate, Argentina. (KUN16, KUN26, KUN36)
- 2005 4.0 L petrol VVT-i DOHC V6, 170–176 kW (231–239 PS; 228–236 hp) (Australia, South Africa, Venezuela, China) (GGN15, GGN25, GGN35)
- 2008 4.0 L Supercharged DOHC V6 225 kW (306 PS; 302 hp) (Australia only, TRD Hilux 4000S & 4000SL)

=== 2008 facelift ===
A facelifted version of the Hilux was unveiled by Toyota's Malaysian distributors, UMW Toyota Motor, in August 2008. Toyota has introduced a left hand drive Hilux Vigo in August 2008 while a right hand drive facelifted model was introduced in September 2008. These facelifted models were introduced in the Philippines in October 2008.

Toyota also introduced a four-door extended cab called "Smart Cab" to replace all Xtra Cab models in E and G grade. The Smart Cab models were developed in Thailand and were only sold in the Thai market.

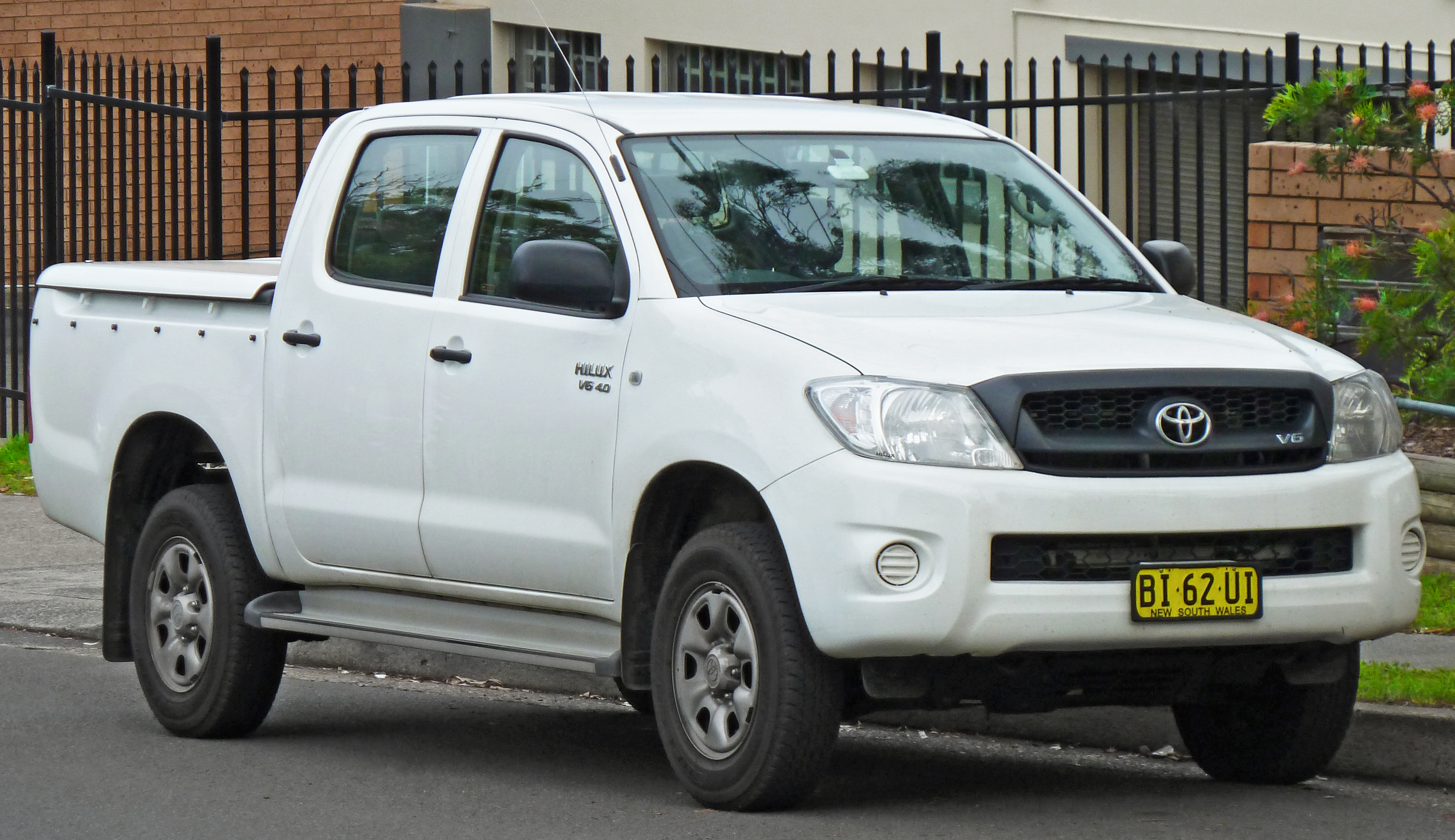
First facelift (front)

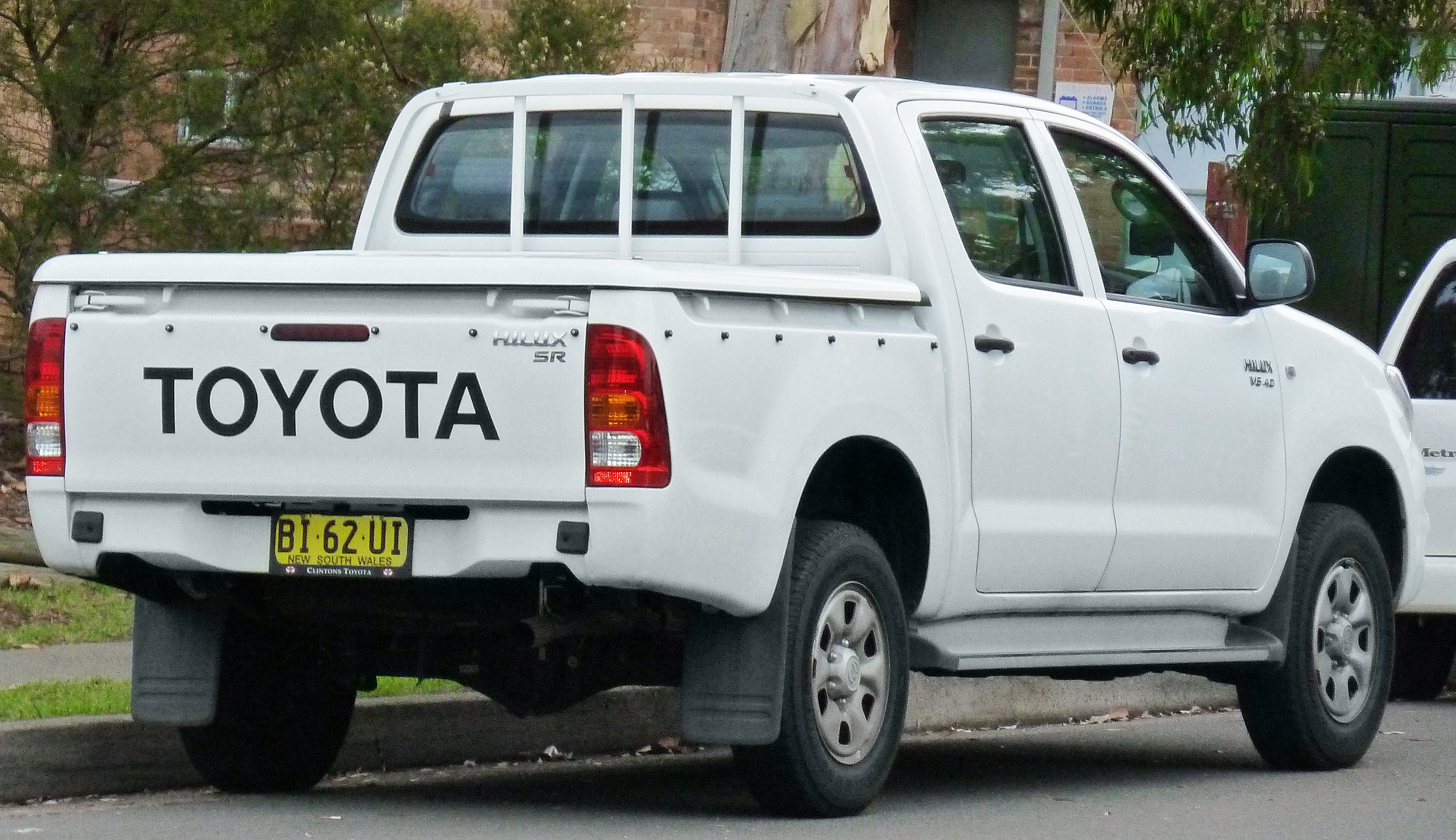
First facelift (rear)

=== 2011 facelift ===
On 13 July 2011, Toyota announced that the Hilux would receive a facelift, including a redesigned front end (front grille similar to IMV-based Innova and Fortuner) and other external styling changes, changes to the interior and a new turbocharged diesel engine rated at 107 kW (144 hp) and 343 N⋅m (253 lb⋅ft) of torque, as well as lower fuel consumption compared to the previous model. This update was initially launched in Thailand and later in Australia called as Toyota IMV Project.

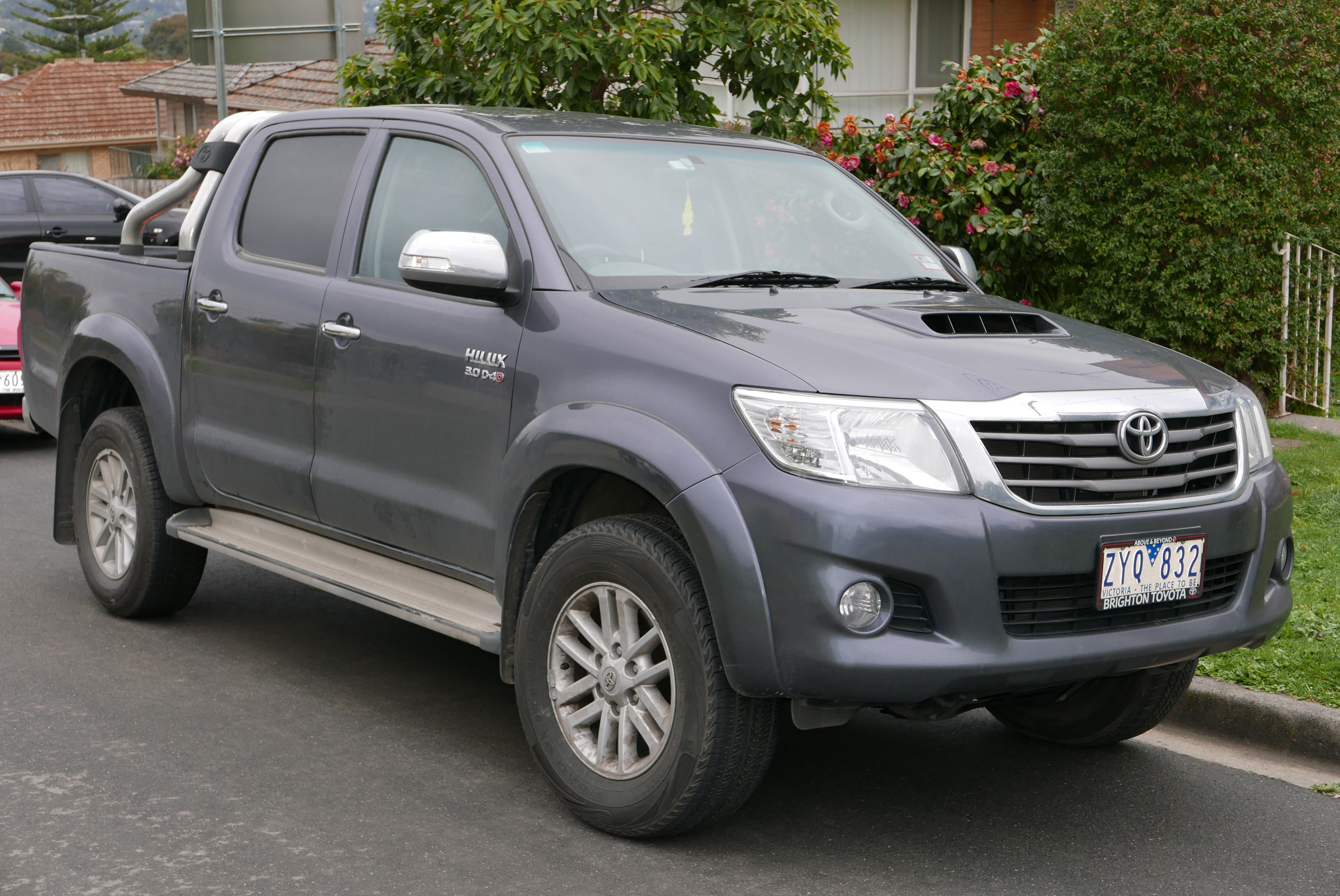
Second facelift (front)

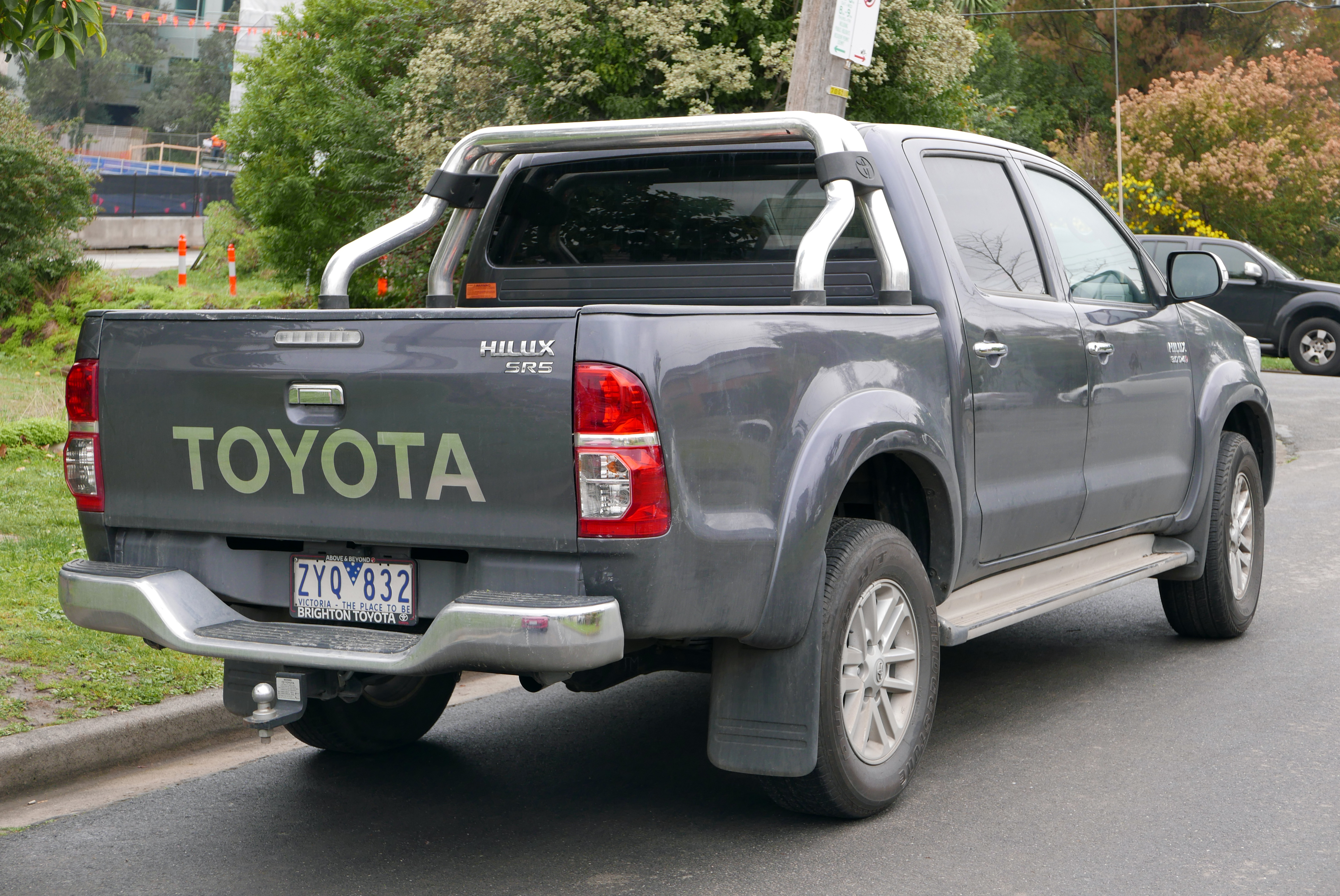
Second facelift (rear)

=== Hilux Vigo Champ ===
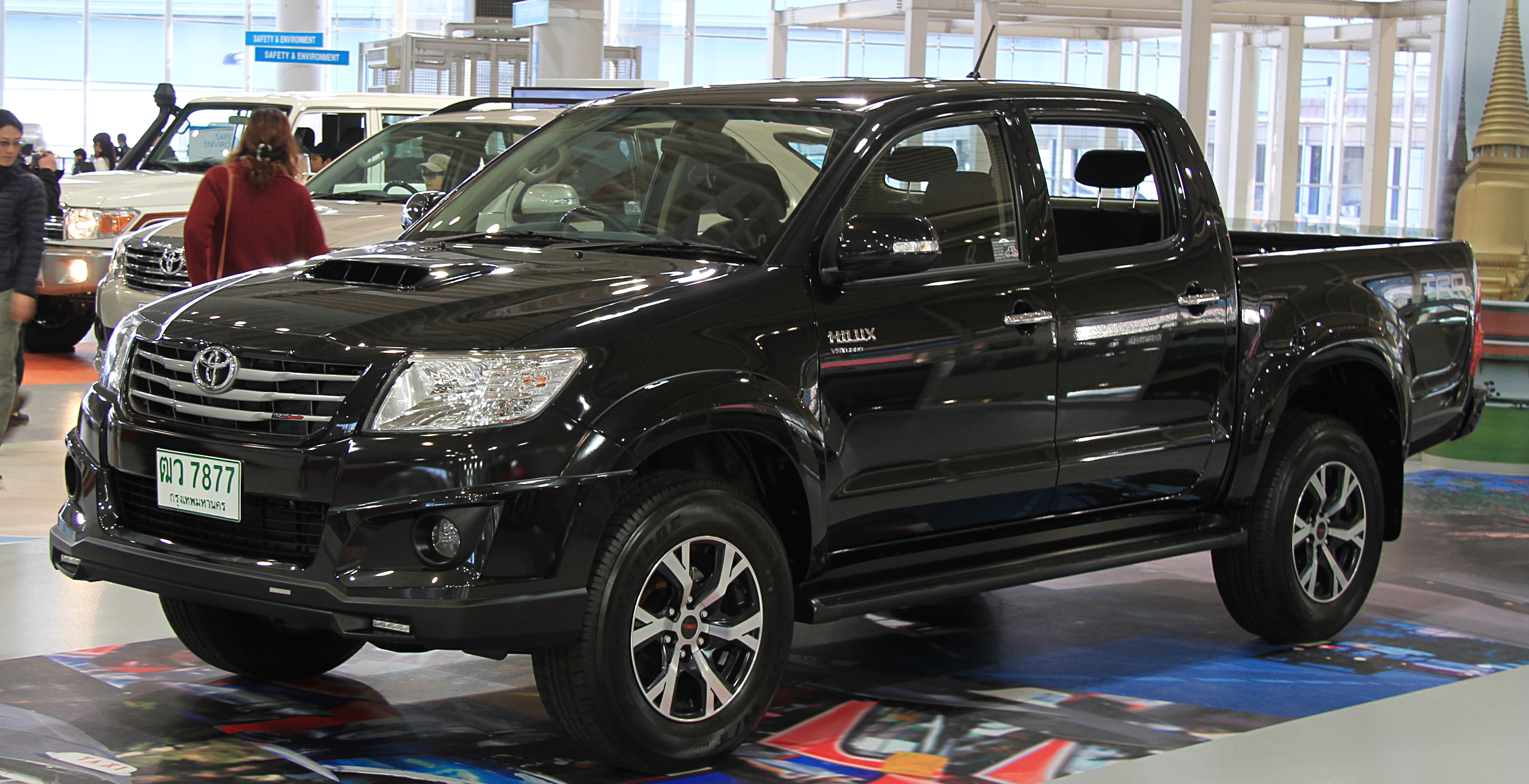
HiLux Vigo Champ TRD (Thailand)

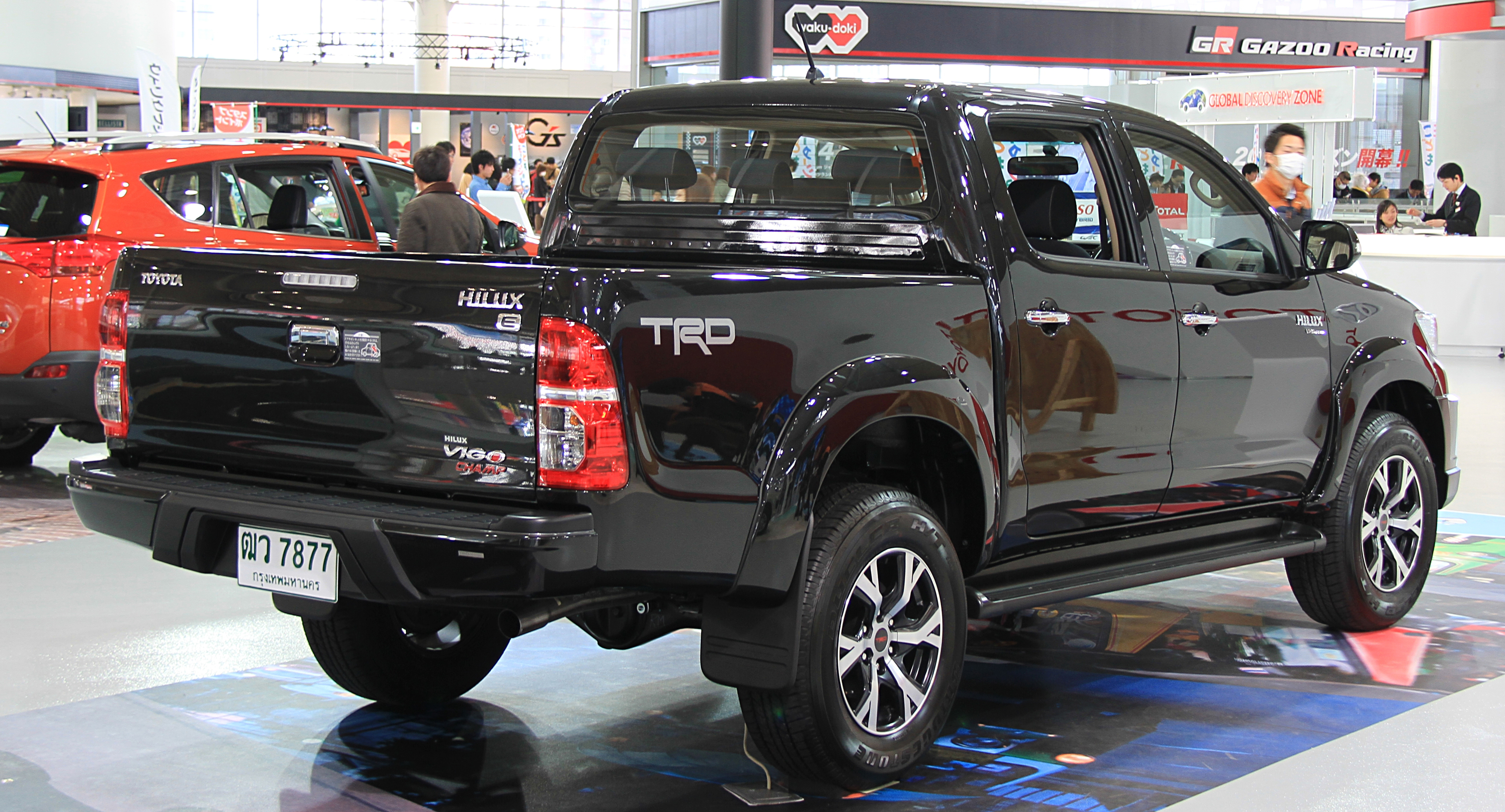
HiLux Vigo Champ TRD (Thailand)

The Hilux Vigo Champ was introduced in Thailand in August 2012 as a significant "minor change" with a new front design and a revamped interior to reinforce perceived luxury. The front was redesigned from the A pillar forwards. With the exception of the doors, roof and tailgate, everything else was new: new guards, new headlights, new bumper, new bonnet, new three-bar grille, new taillights, a new rear bumper and new badges. There were also new mirrors and new alloy wheel designs. The interior features a new upper dashboard design with a new horizontal centre instrument cluster. Perceived quality was improved through the adoption of uniformly darker finishes with greater colour consistency throughout the interior. The high-end Double Cab version now came with a DVD player, rear camera and Bluetooth functionality.

This minor update upgraded the emission standard to Euro 4, updated the four-speed automatic transmission to five-speed, upgraded power rating of the 3.0-litre model from 122 to 128 kW (166 to 174 PS; 164 to 172 hp), increased torque from 343 to 360 N⋅m (253 to 266 ft⋅lb) for the five-speed automatic transmission, and the Smart Cab Prerunner 4×2 was introduced with automatic transmission. Other changes included a more efficient fuel injection system and the addition of a centre headrest on the rear double cab seat.

The Vigo Champ CNG included the 2.7-litre 2TR-FE bi-fuel engine that could run on compressed natural gas (CNG).

=== Safety ===
ANCAP test results* Toyota Hilux 4x2 Workmate single cab chassis (2005)
Test	Score
Overall	4 /5 stars
Frontal offset	11.31/16
Side impact	16/16
Pole	Not Assessed
Seat belt reminders	0/3
Whiplash protection	Not Assessed
Pedestrian protection	Not Assessed
Electronic stability control	Not Assessed

ANCAP test results* Toyota Hilux 4x4 SR dual cab (2005)
Test	Score
Overall	4 /5 stars
Frontal offset	10.86/16
Side impact	16/16
Pole	Not Assessed
Seat belt reminders	0/3
Whiplash protection	Not Assessed
Pedestrian protection	Poor
Electronic stability control	Not Assessed

ANCAP test results* Toyota Hilux all 4x4 single and extra cab variants (2011)
Test	Score
Overall	5 /5 stars
Frontal offset	12.86/16
Side impact	16/16
Pole	2/2
Seat belt reminders	2/3
Whiplash protection	Not Assessed
Pedestrian protection	Poor
Electronic stability control	Standard

ANCAP test results* Toyota Hilux all 4x4 dual cab variants (2011)
Test	Score
Overall	5 /5 stars
Frontal offset	12.86/16
Side impact	16/16
Pole	2/2
Seat belt reminders	2/3
Whiplash protection	Not Assessed
Pedestrian protection	Poor
Electronic stability control	Standard

== Eighth generation (AN110, AN120, AN130; 2015) ==
Eighth generation
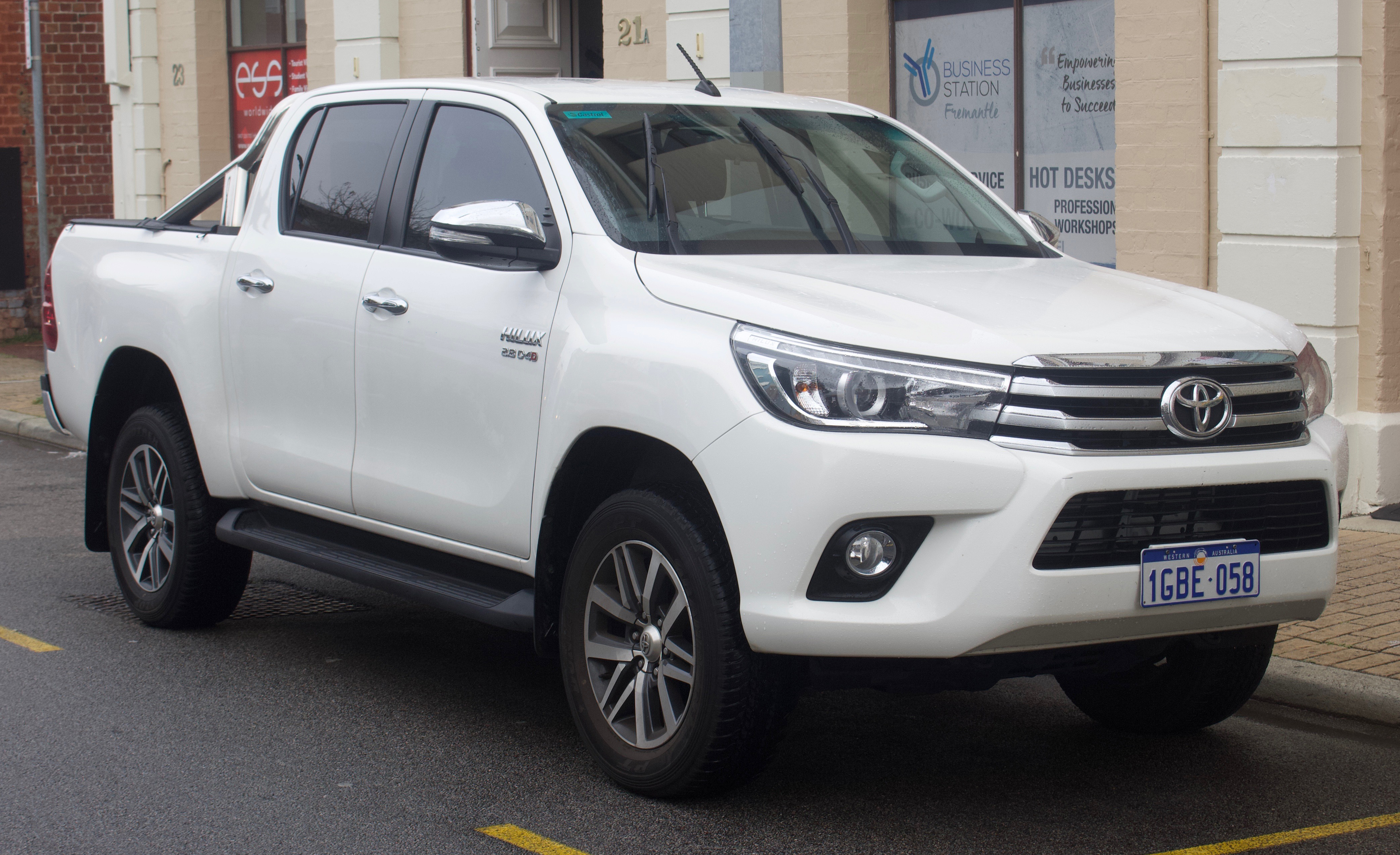
- 2016 Toyota Hilux SR5 (GUN136; pre-facelift)

Overview
- Model code: AN110; AN120; AN130
- Also called: TruckMasters OX (Finland)
- Production: May 2015 – present
- Assembly: Thailand: Ban Pho; Samrong Tai (TMT); South Africa: Prospecton (TSAM); Argentina: Zárate, Buenos Aires (TASA); Malaysia: Shah Alam (UMW); Pakistan: Karachi (IMC); India: Bidadi (TKM); Myanmar: Thilawa (Toyota Myanmar); Cambodia: Phnom Penh (TTMC)
- Designer: Ryota Naka, Yukihiro Koide, Takuya Watabe, Eishi Suzuki and Yusuke Fukushima; Peter Anthony Elliott (2020 facelift)

Body and chassis
- Body style: 2-door pickup truck; 4-door pickup truck
- Layout: Front-engine, rear-wheel-drive; Front-engine, four-wheel-drive
- Platform: Toyota IMV
- Related: Toyota Hilux Champ; Toyota Fortuner (AN150/AN160); Toyota Land Cruiser FJ; Toyota Innova (AN140)

Powertrain
- Engine: Petrol: 2.0 L 1TR-FE I4; 2.7 L 2TR-FE I4; 4.0 L 1GR-FE V6; Diesel: 2.4 L 2GD-FTV turbo I4; 2.5 L 2KD-FTV turbo I4; 2.5 L 2KD-FTV turbo-intercooled I4; 2.8 L 1GD-FTV turbo I4; 3.0 L 1KD-FTV turbo I4; 3.0 L 5L-E I4
- Power output: 10 kW (13 hp) electric motor (MHEV); 12kW, 65Nm (MHEV); 8.4kW, 65Nm (MHEV)
- Transmission: 5-speed R151 manual; 6-speed RC60/RC61 manual / iMT manual; 5-speed A750F automatic; 6-speed AC60 Super Intelligent ECT automatic
- Battery: 0.5 kWh, 48V (MHEV); 0.207 kWh, 48V (MHEV); 0.2064 kWh, 48V, 13 cells (MHEV), charges 12V battery via DC/DC converter

Dimensions
- Wheelbase: 2,750 mm (108.3 in) (short-wheelbase); 3,085 mm (121.5 in) (long-wheelbase)
- Length: Crew Cab: 5,320–5,325 mm (209.4–209.6 in); Single Cab: 4,935–5,270 mm (194.3–207.5 in); Smart Cab: 5,320 mm (209.4 in)
- Width: 1,800–2,020 mm (70.9–79.5 in)
- Height: Crew Cab: 1,750–1,880 mm (68.9–74.0 in); Single Cab: 1,690–1,855 mm (66.5–73.0 in); Smart Cab: 1,695–1,860 mm (66.7–73.2 in)
- Curb weight: 1,495–2,286 kg (3,296–5,040 lb)

The eighth-generation Hilux was introduced simultaneously on 21 May 2015 in Bangkok, Thailand and Sydney, Australia. It was the first of the Toyota IMV family to receive a new generation, with the related Fortuner and Innova receiving new generations in July and November, respectively. In some Asian markets such as Thailand, Laos, Cambodia, Myanmar, and Pakistan, the model also adopted a new moniker, Hilux Revo.

The model was subsequently introduced in the Philippines in July 2015, Mexico and GCC countries in August 2015, and Argentina and Brazil in November 2015, while in Europe specifications were unveiled in September 2015 for a mid-2016 market introduction. Introductions of the model in more markets started in 2016. In March 2016, the model was released in South Africa, where it is also produced. In Malaysia, it was launched in May 2016, while in Pakistan it was launched in September 2016. In September 2017, Toyota released the Hilux in Japan for the first time since 2004.

The eighth-generation Hilux features the "Keen Look" design language with a slimmer headlight shape (with optional projector headlights and LED daytime running lights). This design continues into the interior with similar AC vents and centre fascia design, which has been described as more "car-like". First for a Hilux, this generation is available with an optional autonomous emergency braking system (AEB).

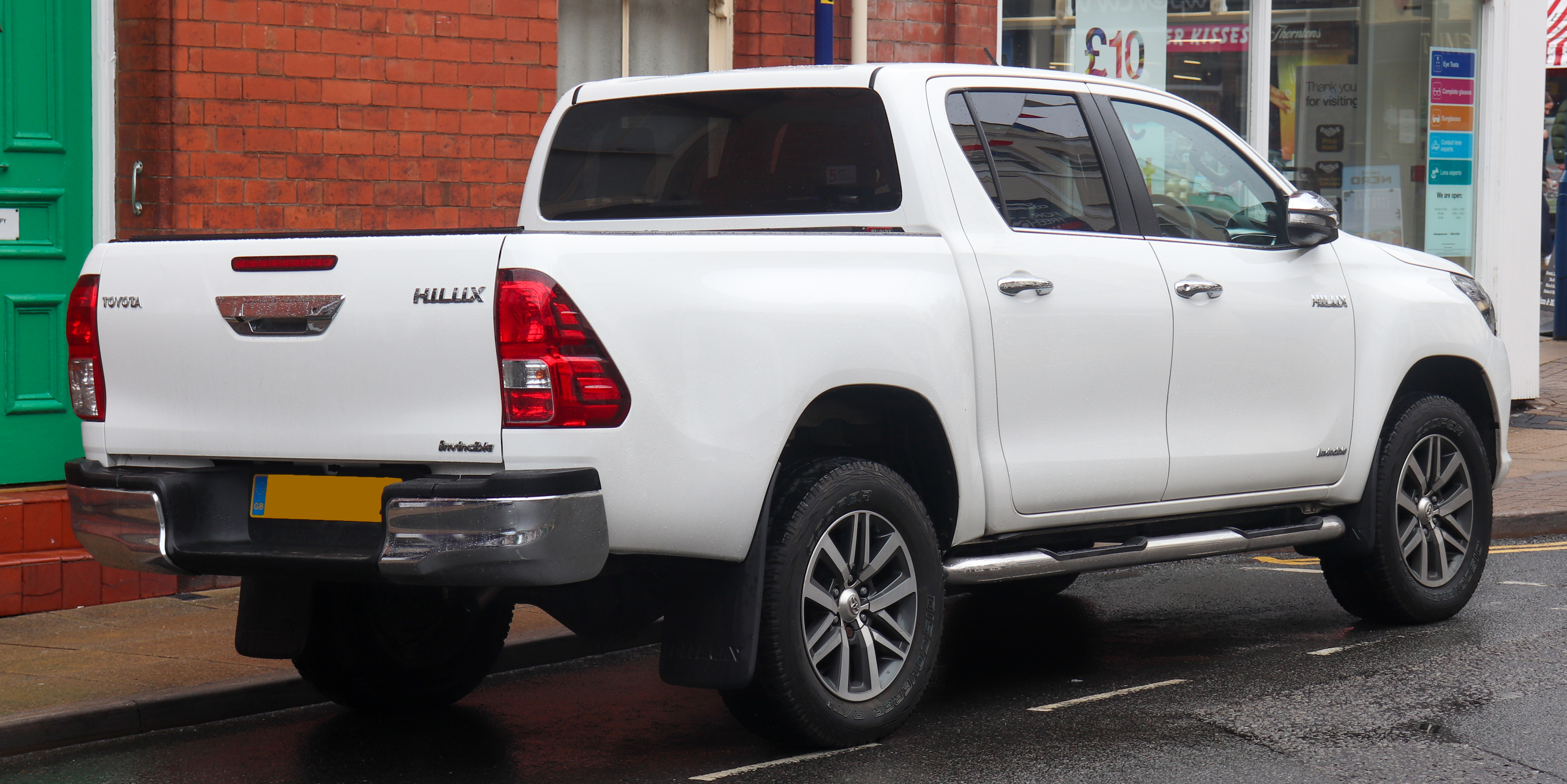
2016 Hilux Invincible (GUN125; pre-facelift)

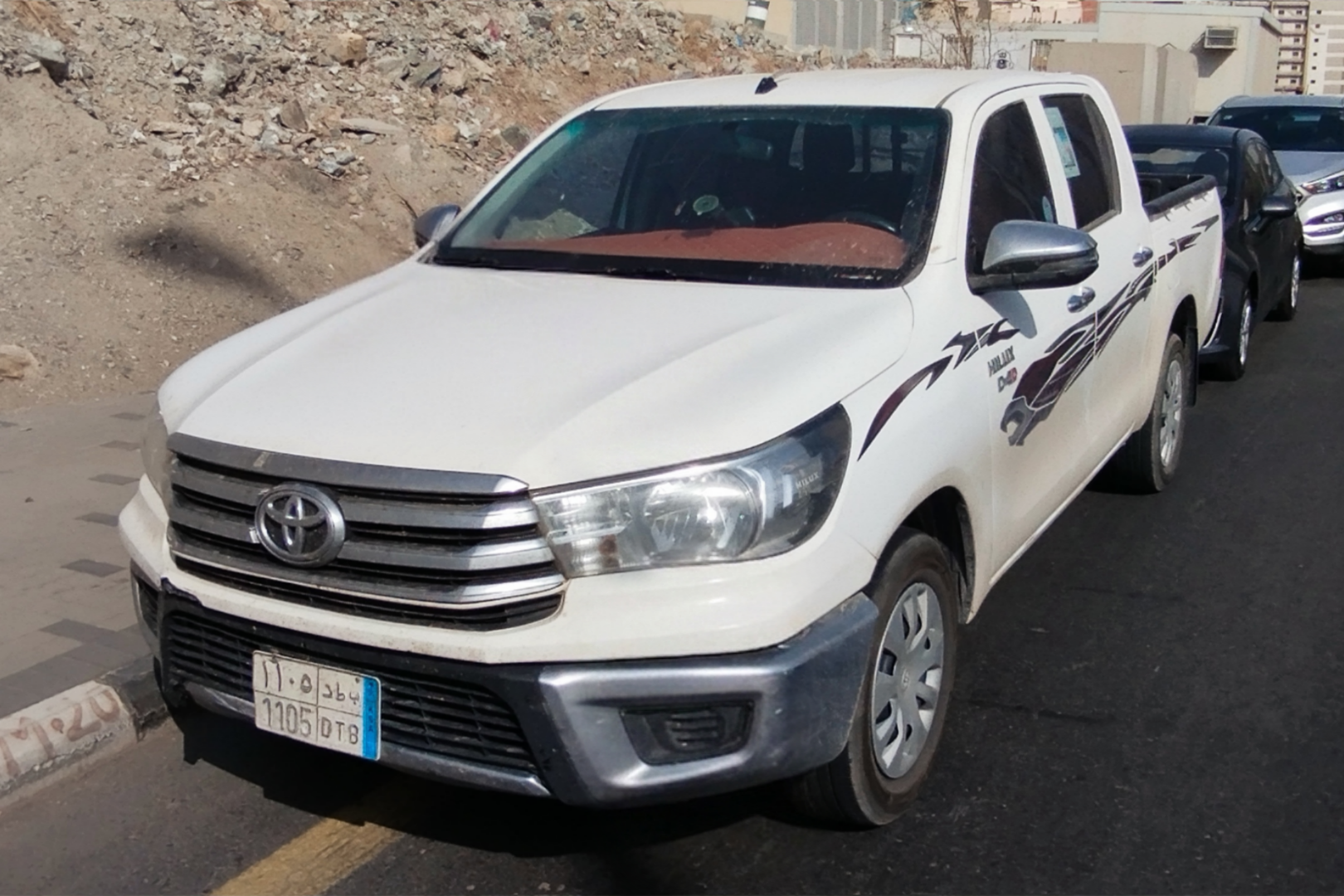
GCC-spec with metal front bumper

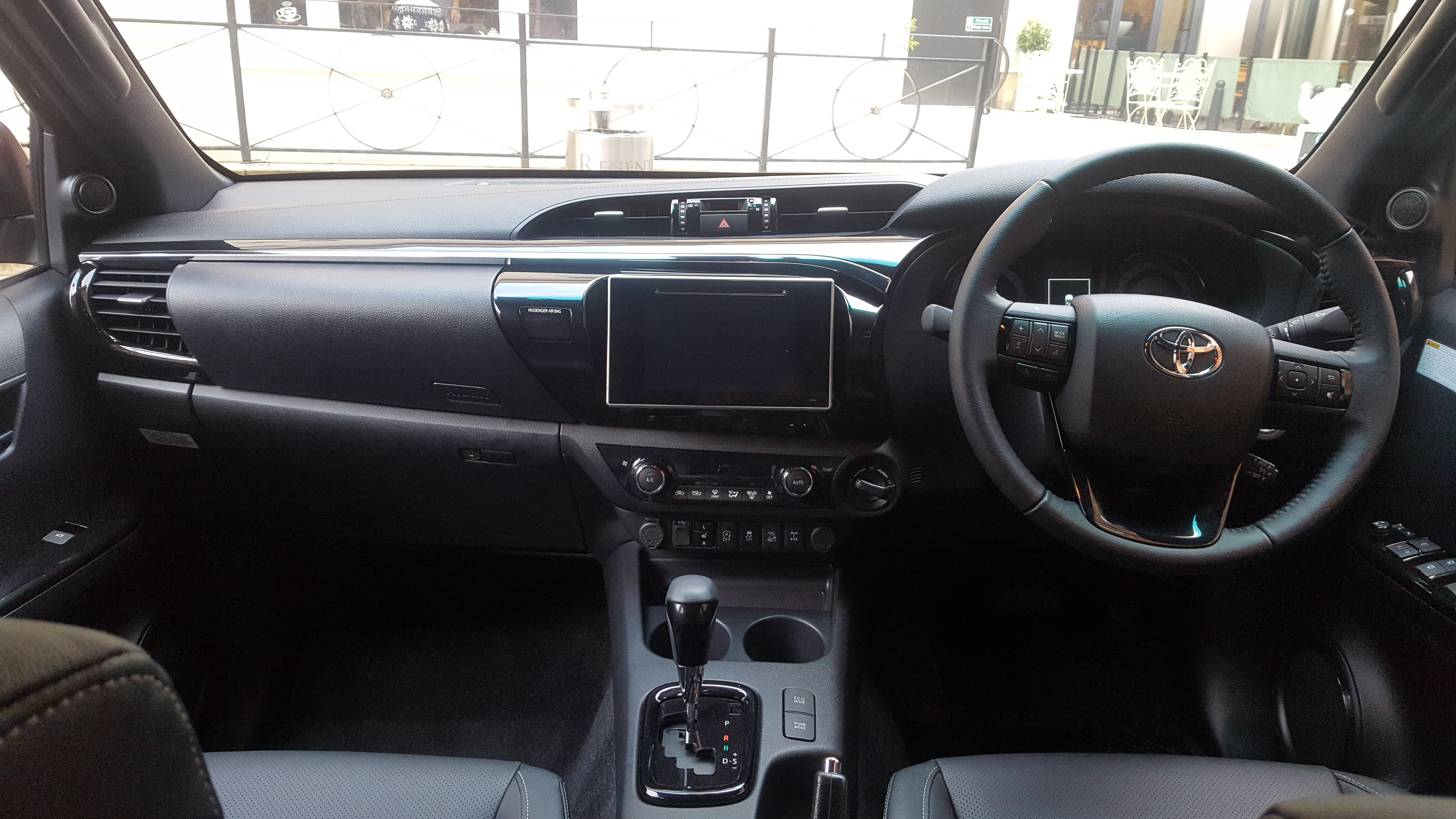
Interior

=== Development ===
Development of the vehicle was led by Hiroki Nakajima as chief engineer, who visited 120 countries during its development. It was reported that in 2011, Toyota started over on the new Hilux just six months into development due to the release of the Volkswagen Amarok and Ford Ranger, which reset Toyota's benchmark for "car-like driving". Toyota President and CEO Akio Toyoda personally intervened to set the Hilux on a new development path.

Toyota stated the eighth-generation Hilux received larger cabin space in the front and rear with 19 mm (0.7 in) extra shoulder room, 8 mm (0.3 in) extra head room, 15 mm (0.6 in) higher seat height and 35 mm (1.4 in) larger rear knee room. It also featured a broader seat adjustment range and a larger 80-litre (17.6 imp gal; 21.1 US gal) fuel tank. It is also equipped with rear air vents as an option, making it one of the few pickups in its segment with rear air vents at the time of its launch.

The front bumper has a bigger bulge to meet new pedestrian safety regulations, while the lower section of the front bumper has been shaped to ensure the Hilux is more agile than its predecessor in off-road conditions. In the Middle East, the Hilux received an optional steel front bumper. The approach angle is 31 degrees and the departure angle is 26 degrees, compared to the previous 30 and 23, respectively.

The new ladder-frame chassis gives the vehicle a 20-percent increase in torsional rigidity compared to the previous generation model. The stronger FIRM (Frame with Integrated Rigidity Mechanism) makes use of high-tensile strength steel and more spot welds. The improved body structure is said to yield lower noise, vibration and harshness levels. It is also equipped with a newly developed Dynamic Control Suspension system and Body Control with Torque Demand.

Three different suspension setups are available for the Hilux for different markets. Vehicles destined for Australia, South Africa, Russia and South America receive an Australian-developed heavy-duty suspension setup that offers improved off-road performance, better vibration suppression and improved roll stiffness. Vehicles sold in Thailand receive a comfort-biased setup due to the large market of pickup trucks for personal use. The third suspension setup is a general setup that is "suited to all road conditions the world over." The suspension setups consist of front double wishbone with a thicker front stabiliser bar and rear leaf spring configuration. It is aimed to give the Hilux a more "car-like" driving experience.

=== Markets ===
==== Argentina ====
As of 2016, the Argentine version has about 40% of locally and 60% of regionally made parts.

==== Australia ====
During its introduction in Australia, the eighth-generation Hilux was offered with 31 variants, eight more than its predecessor, with 4×2 and 4×4 single, extra and double cabin styles, and WorkMate, SR and SR5 grade levels. Toyota has also added Hi-Rider variants for SR and SR5 models, with added ride height, heavy-duty suspensions, larger front ventilated disc brakes and larger rear drum brakes.

Four engine options are offered in the market, ranging from the 2.4-litre turbo-diesel, 2.8-litre turbo-diesel (with different outputs for both 4×2 and 4×4), 2.7-litre petrol and 4.0-litre V6 petrol, and continues to be imported from Thailand.

The Australian specification Hilux offers an upgraded 3,500 kg (7,716 lb) towing capacity (for diesel manual) or 3,200 kg (7,055 lb) for diesel automatic model, while it also offers a payload of up to 1,240 kg (2,734 lb). It comes equipped with a standard reversing camera, up to seven airbags, electronic stability control, trailer sway control and rear parking sensors.

In March 2017, the TRD appearance package became available. In January 2018, Toyota introduced the Hilux Rugged X, Rogue and Rugged variants which were fully designed, developed and engineered in Australia. Based on the double-cab 4×4 Hilux, the three variants are targeted towards "urban adventurers" with off-road related changes and additions. The 2020 facelift was presented in August, which also introduced upgraded diesel engines and Toyota Safety Sense.

In September 2022, the Hilux Rogue received upgrades such as wider tracks and fenders, larger 18-inch wheels, rear disc brakes replacing drum brakes and larger front brake discs. It also gained extended front suspension arms, a lengthened rear axle, revised rear dampers, and a rear anti-roll bar, which are claimed to increase the vehicle's roll rigidity by 20 percent.

In January 2023, the GR Sport model became available in Australia with a different styling compared to the Hilux GR Sport in other markets, by sharing many elements with the Hilux Rogue. Powered with the 2.8-litre diesel engine, it received engine upgrades, heavy-duty suspension, wider fenders and wider track.

==== Cambodia ====
The eighth‑generation Hilux was officially introduced to the Cambodian market back in 2016, with local assembly for the Cambodian market began in May 2024 at the Phnom Penh Special Economic Zone by TTMC. The locally assembled Hilux Revo is offered in V Edition and Rally trims, both powered by a 2.8‑litre diesel engine paired with a six‑speed automatic transmission and four‑wheel drive. Standard equipment includes wireless Apple CarPlay and Android Auto, Bi‑LED headlamps, and advanced safety features.

==== Europe ====
The eighth-generation Hilux entered European markets such as the UK in April 2016 with customer deliveries in July. It was available in Active, Icon, Invincible and Invincible X grade levels and single, extra and double cab body styles. The sole powertrain option is the 2.4-litre diesel engine. The 2020 facelift model received an optional 2.8-litre diesel engine, and a GR Sport variant since 2022.

Like the previous generation, this generation has also been sold as the TruckMasters OX in Finland by Truck Masters Finland since 2017. The modified suspension means that the truck is registered as a light truck in Finland, leading to lower taxes.

==== India ====
In India, the Hilux was unveiled in January 2022 and went on sale in late March 2022. Mainly marketed as a "lifestyle utility vehicle", it is offered in Low and High trim levels. Models sold in India are assembled at Toyota Kirloskar Motor's plant in Bidadi, Karnataka, and 30 percent of its components are sourced locally.

==== Japan ====
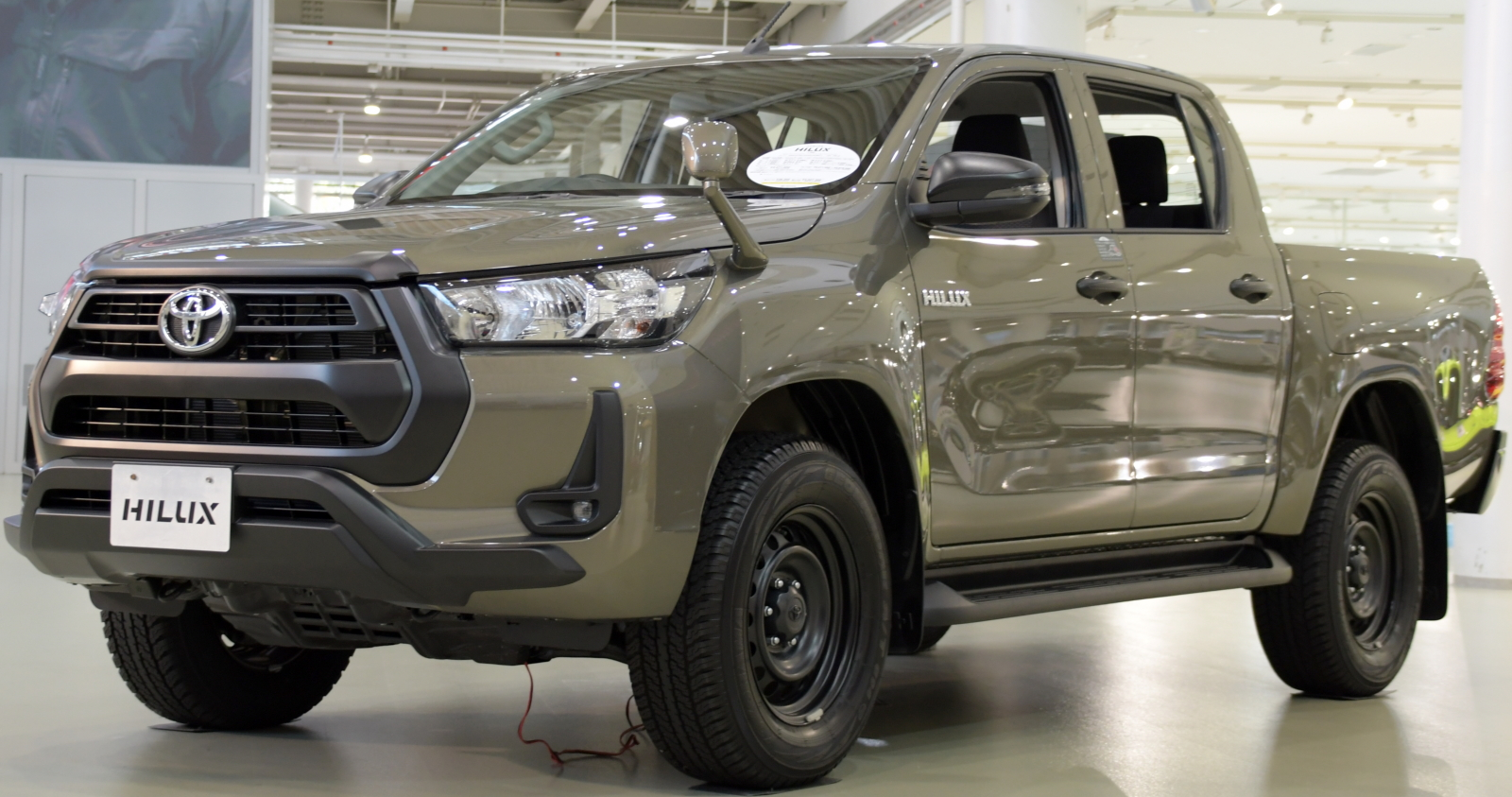
Toyota Hilux (GUN12, Japan)

The Hilux was reintroduced in Japan on 12 September 2017, after 13 years of hiatus. Initial orders for the vehicle exceeded 2,000 in the first month of sales. For the Japanese market, the Hilux is imported from Thailand, with only double-cab 4WD configuration available in two trim levels, "X" and "Z", both equipped with a 2.4-litre 2GD-FTV engine and a 6-speed automatic transmission.

==== Pakistan ====
Indus Motor Company launched the eighth-generation Hilux in early 2017 under the Hilux Revo brand name, with eight variants, all powered by the 3.0-litre 1KD-FTV engine. There was a choice of a 6-speed manual transmission (RC60/RC61) or a 5-speed automatic transmission (A750F).

In February 2018, the 3.0-litre diesel engine and 5-speed automatic transmission were discontinued and replaced by the 2.8-litre 1GD-FTV engine and 6-speed automatic transmission (AC60). The 2018 Hilux was offered with multiple trim levels, beginning with the entry-level "E" model, followed by the mid-grade "G" and the highest trim level "V" variant, which was equipped with push start, keyless entry, a touchscreen infotainment system and downhill assist control, among other advanced features.

In July 2021, the facelift version was introduced, followed by the introduction of a new trim level called Rocco in February 2022, which featured a more aggressive design with fender flares, matte black accents and an updated front bumper. The launch of the Hilux Revo Rocco also brought parking sensors and dual-zone climate control. In March 2023, the Hilux GR-S model was launched, bringing Apple CarPlay and Android Auto support, a new front bumper and radiator grille, red accents in the interior, piano black trim pieces, glossy black alloy wheels and GR badges on the front and rear.

==== Philippines ====
The eighth-generation Hilux was launched in the Philippines in July 2015. It was initially offered in 2.4 Cab & Chassis (manual only), 2.4 FX (manual only), 2.4 J (manual only), 2.4 E (manual only), 2.4 G 4×2 (manual and automatic) and 2.8 G 4×4 (manual and automatic) grades.

In September 2020, the Hilux received a facelift and is offered in 2.4 Cab & Chassis (manual only), 2.4 Cargo (manual only), 2.4 FX (manual only), 2.4 J (available either in 4×2 or 4×4, manual only), 2.4 E 4×2 (manual only), 2.4 G 4×2 (manual and automatic), 2.4 Conquest 4×2 (manual and automatic) and 2.8 Conquest 4×4 (manual and automatic) grades. In August 2022, the Hilux gained a feature list upgrade.

In September 2023, the Hilux GR-S was updated with the similar styling as the Australian market GR Sport model while the G grade received the same styling as the Conquest grade. The manual transmission variant of the 2.4 Conquest 4×2 was discontinued.

==== South Africa ====
As of 2016, Toyota South Africa Motors (TSAM) would export more than 55,000 Hilux and Fortuner units to 74 countries, including Africa (43 markets), Europe (28 markets) and Latin America (three markets). Hilux vehicles sold in South Africa are marketed as 2.4 and 2.8 GD-6 respectively which signifies engine displacement, the GD engine series and the 6 speed transmission. Exports included right-hand-drive and left-hand-drive variants, and would consist of more than 50 percent of TSAM’s total 2016 Hilux and Fortuner production.

==== Taiwan ====
The eighth-generation Hilux was launched in Taiwan on 31 July 2019.

On 29 July 2020, the facelift Hilux was launched in Taiwan.

==== Thailand ====
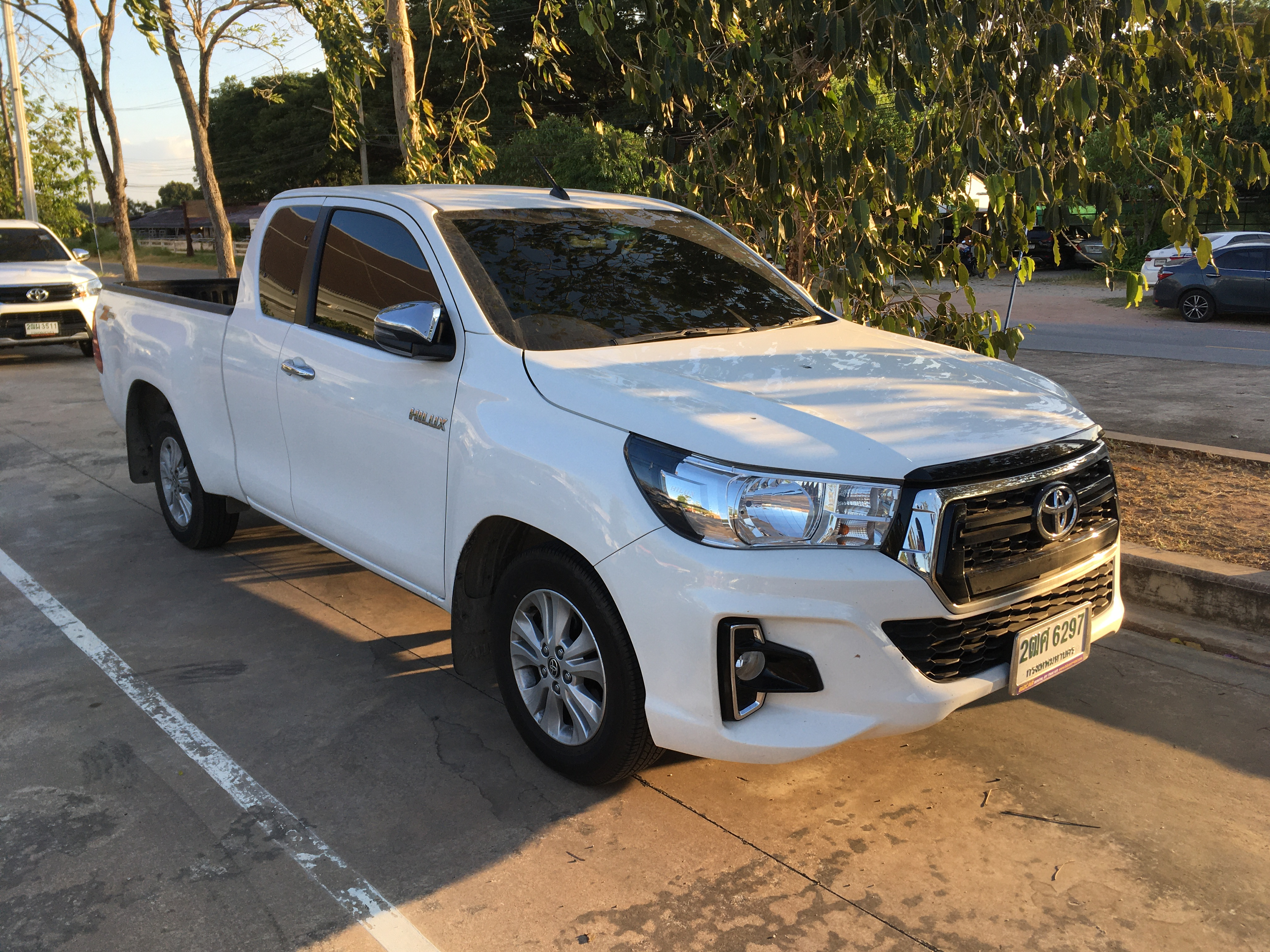
HiLux Revo single cab (Thailand)

Thailand is the major export hub for the Hilux, with 60 percent of local production allocated for exports as of 2015. Initial plans were to export 186,000 units to over 130 countries with a focus on major markets such as Australia, New Zealand, the Middle East, South America, and UK.

The domestic market model is marketed as the Hilux Revo, which consists of single, extra cab (Smart Cab) and double cabin (Double Cab) body styles, with both Smart Cab and Double Cab model receiving an optional high-riding Prerunner model.

In March 2016, the TRD Sportivo appearance package became available. In November 2017, Hilux Revo Rocco also introduced as the highest grade level. The Rocco features a grey rear bumper bar, 18-inch alloy wheels with all-terrain tyres, a black sports bar with bed liner, Rocco insignia, gloss black grille, black metallic trim on the interior along with a redesigned instrument cluster. The engine and safety features for the Rocco remain unchanged. Since September 2018, the Hilux Revo Rocco is also available with the 2.4-litre diesel engine. In August 2021, the Hilux Revo received GR Sport variants for low-riding and high-riding models.

=== 2017 facelift ===
A minor redesign of the Hilux was unveiled in November 2017 in Thailand. It features a different front grille styling similar to the North American market Tacoma and a different front bumper with LED fog lights. In Thailand, the redesigned front fascia is only applied to the 4×4 and high-riding 4×2 Prerunner variants, while the entry-level, low-riding 4×2 versions was largely unchanged with minor revisions. In Australia, it was released in August 2018 with the changes restricted to the higher grade levels, SR and SR5, while the basic WorkMate models are unchanged. The rest of the exterior is identical to the initial model. A range-topping Hilux Revo Rocco was also introduced in Thailand, which features exterior accessories.

The Rocco was introduced in Malaysia as Hilux L-Edition in 2018. In the Philippines, the Rocco was introduced in February 2018 as the Conquest. In the UK, this styling was only available for the 'Invincible X' variant, which was launched at the Commercial Vehicle Show on 24 April 2018. In Japan, this model was sold as the Z "Black Rally Edition", which was announced on 12 November 2018 and released on 17 December 2018 to commemorate the 50th anniversary since the launch of the first generation Hilux.

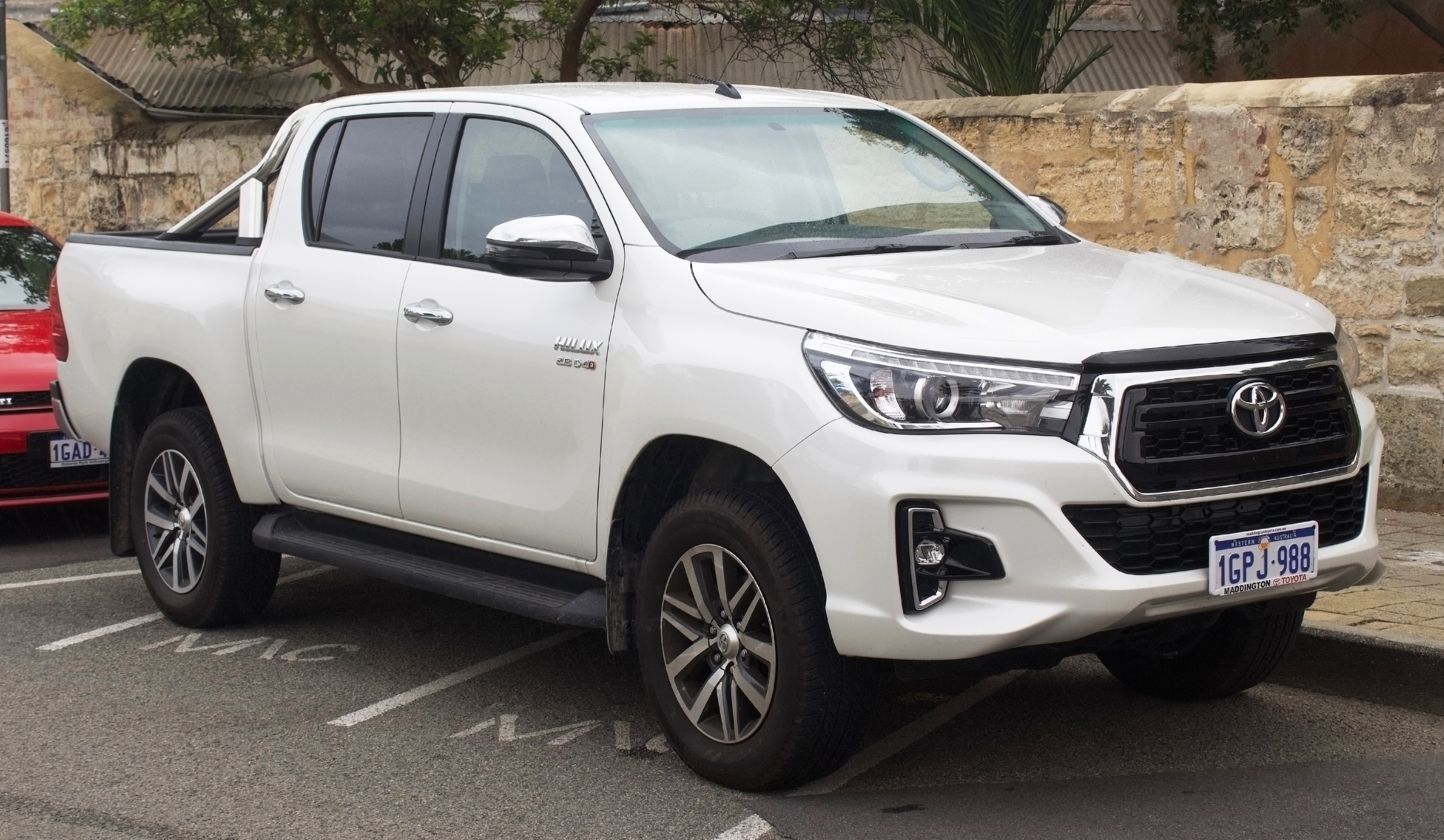
2018 Hilux SR5 4WD (GUN126; 2017 facelift)

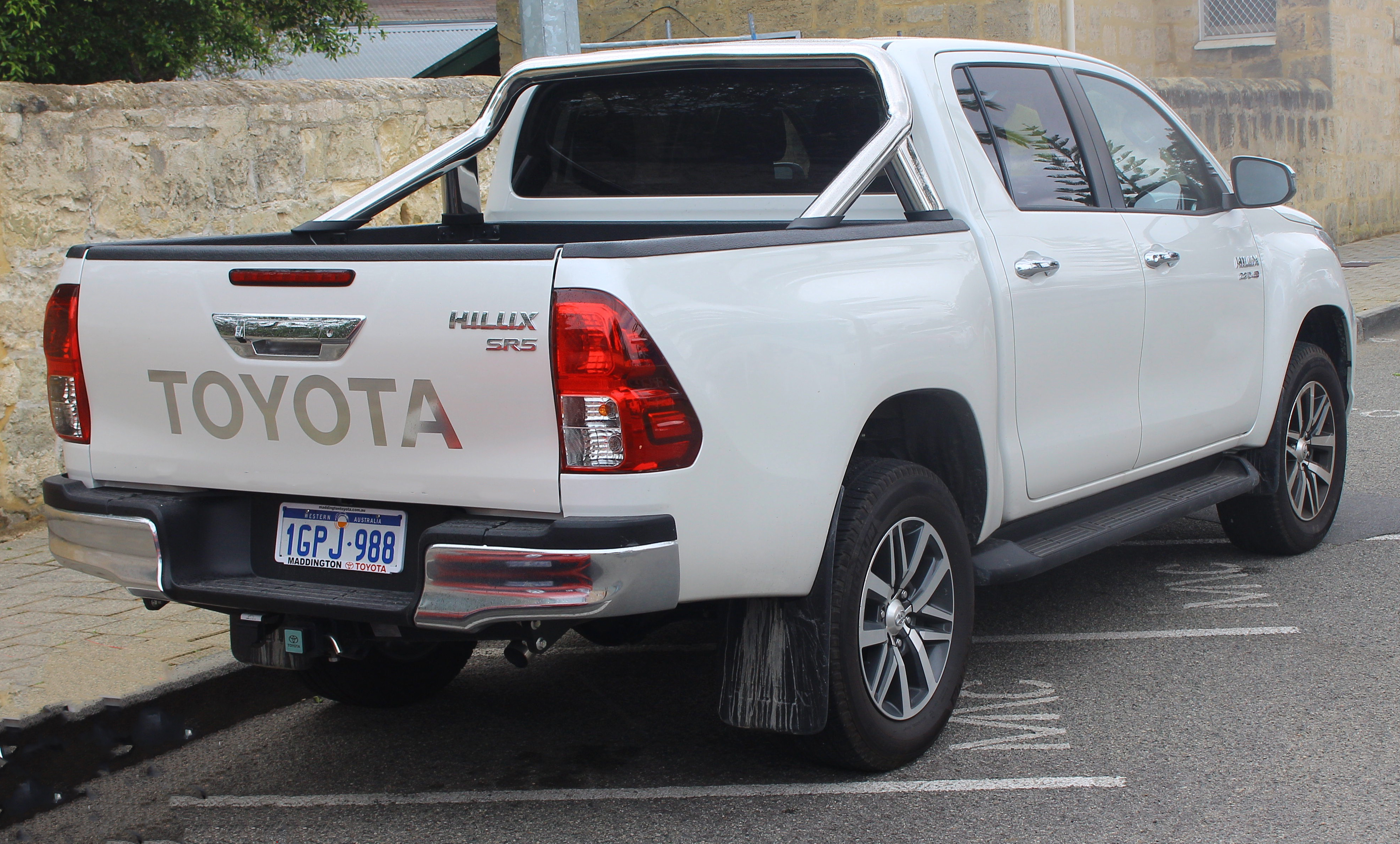
2018 Hilux SR5 4WD (GUN126; 2017 facelift)

=== 2020 facelift ===
In June 2020, Toyota unveiled the second facelift of the AN110/120/130 series Hilux for Asia, Europe and South America. The second facelift model received revised front and rear with LED headlamps and tail-lamps and front LED indicators, a first for the Hilux, and redesigned 18-inch alloy wheels. Revisions inside the interior include a new design for the instrument cluster and the 4.2-inch multi-info display. A more rugged-styled Hilux with larger front grille surface and black fender flares was introduced with different names, such as the Rocco in Thailand and Pakistan, Rogue in Australia and Malaysia, Conquest in the Philippines and South America, Adventure in the UAE, and Invincible X in Europe. A new GR-Sport variant was released alongside the 2020 facelift, with different variants of the GR-S model in Europe, Southeast Asia, and Thailand.

The power and torque figures for 2.8-litre 1GD-FTV diesel engine has been upgraded to 204 PS (150 kW; 201 hp) and 500 N⋅m (51.0 kg⋅m; 369 lb⋅ft) (with automatic transmission), while its 2.4-litre counterpart, the 2GD-FTV diesel engine received a higher-pressure common-rail fuel injection system, along with optimised pistons, piston rings and an uprated alternator to better handle heavier workloads.

Dampers on the 4×4 and 4×2 high-riding versions of the 2020 facelift Hilux have been revised for improved ride comfort with less vibration, particularly with less payload. Leaf spring bushings have been updated for better comfort on rough roads, as well as steering response during cornering and lane changes. A self-lubricating rubber for the rear shackle bush is also added for better ride comfort.

For some Southeast Asian markets, the Hilux became available with Toyota Safety Sense. This facelift of the Hilux was introduced in Japan in August 2020 and is offered in base X and Z trim levels.

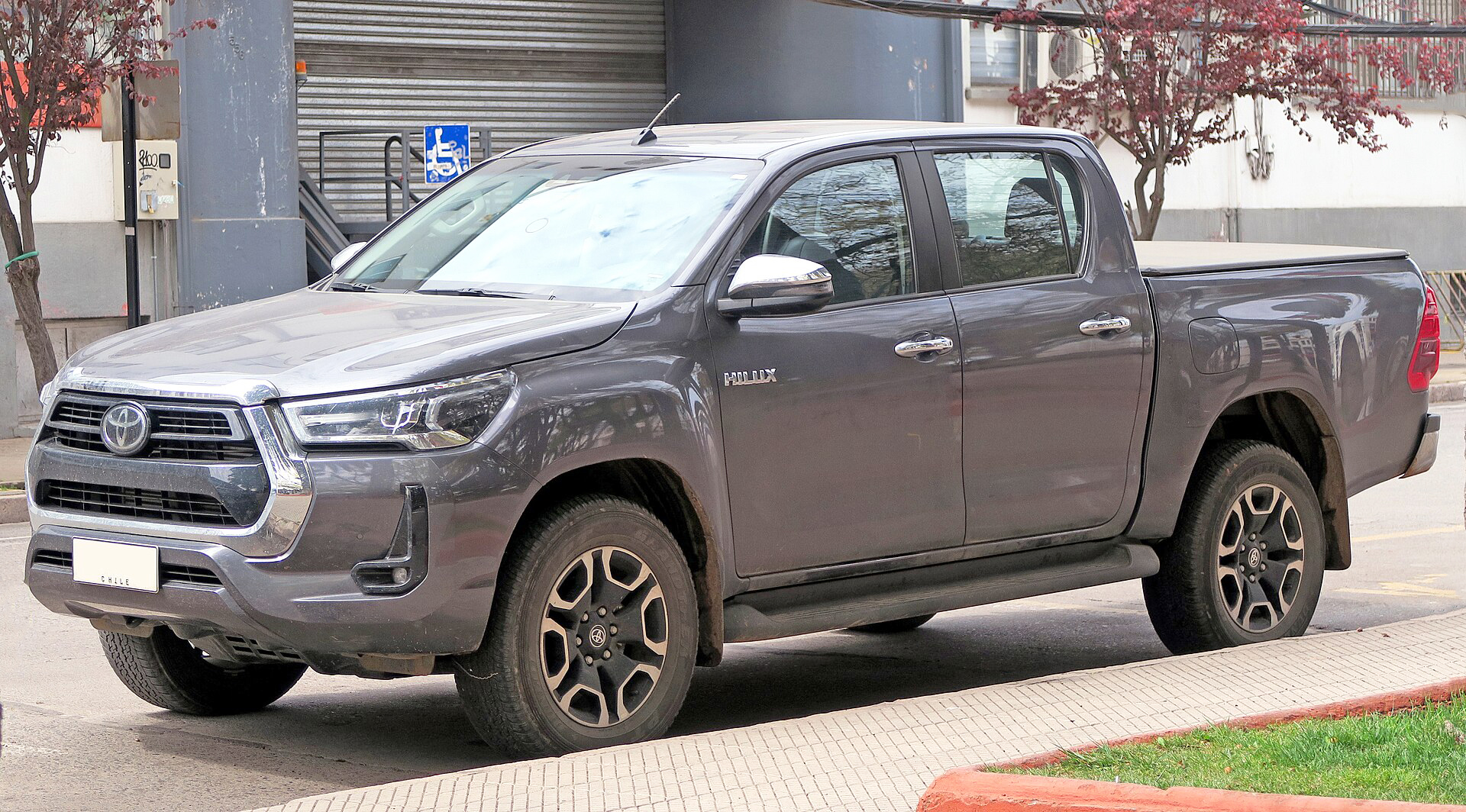
Hilux SRV (Chile; 2020 facelift)

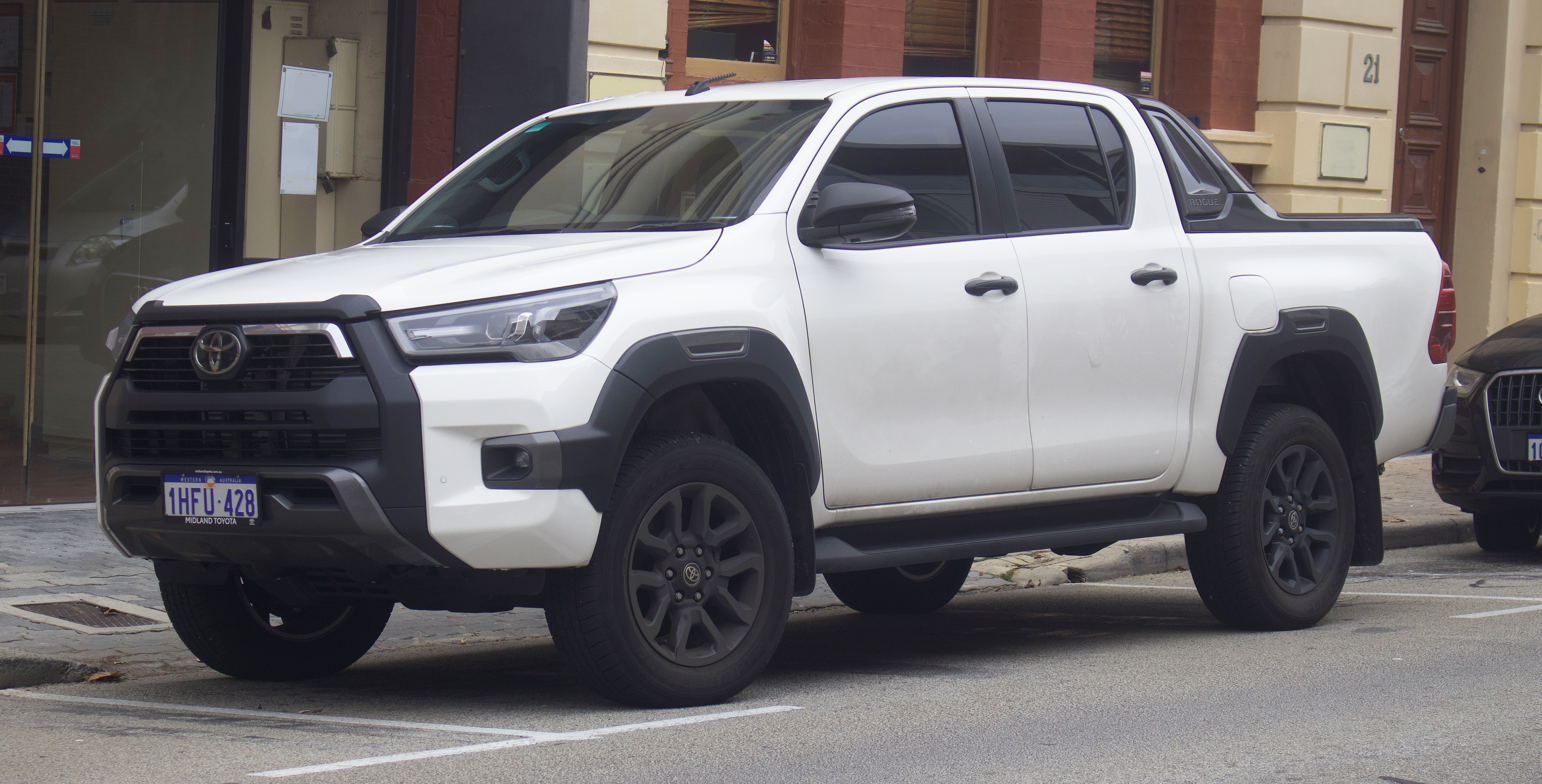
Hilux Rogue (Australia; 2020 facelift)

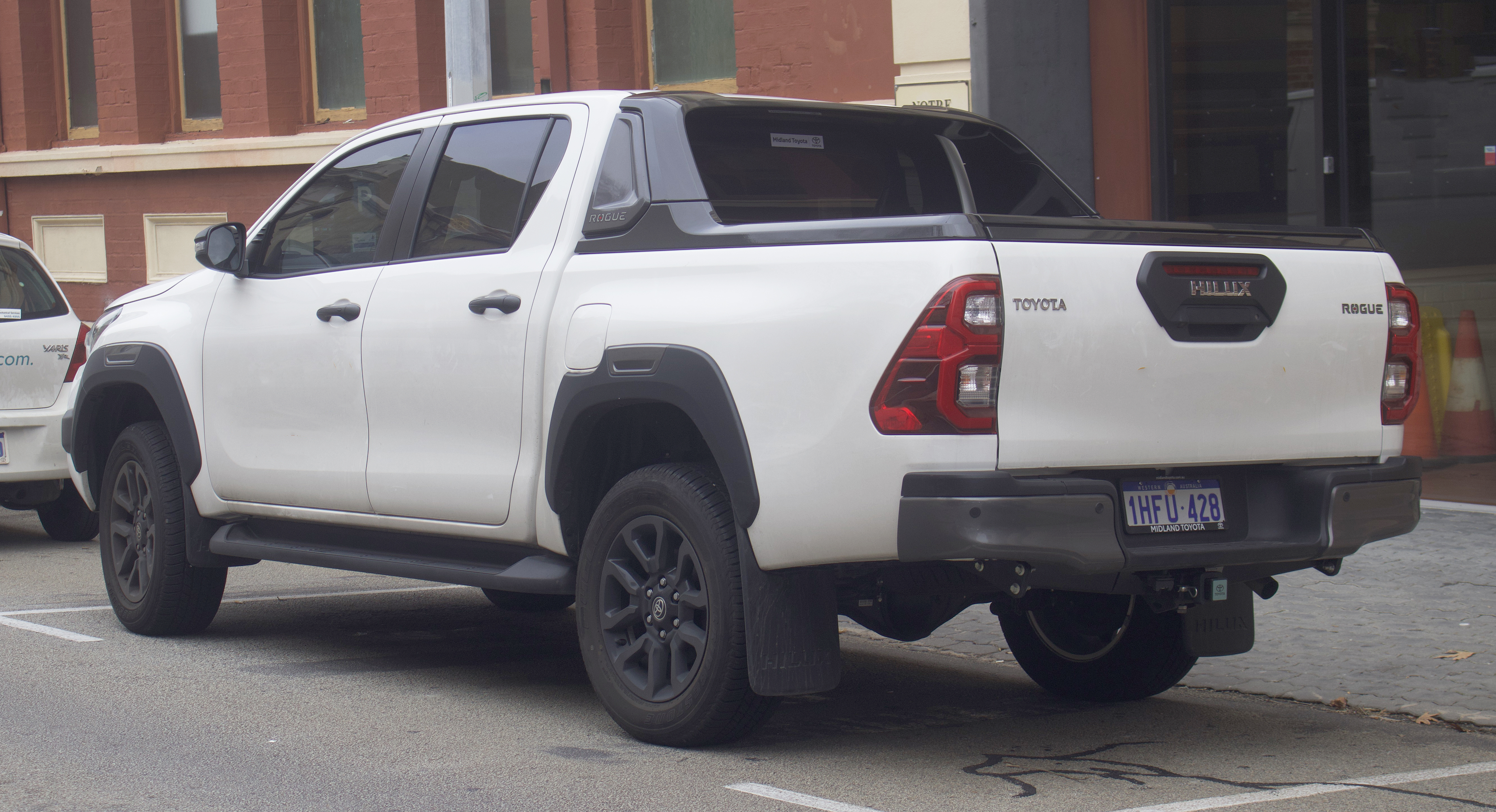
Hilux Rogue (Australia; 2020 facelift)

=== 2024 facelift ===
On 1 February 2024, the third facelift of the AN110/120/130 series Hilux was introduced in Australia and Indonesia. The facelifted Hilux Revo was also launched in Thailand at the 45th Bangkok International Motor Show on 25 March 2024. South Africa also received the same facelift for the Raider double-cab and extra-cab models.

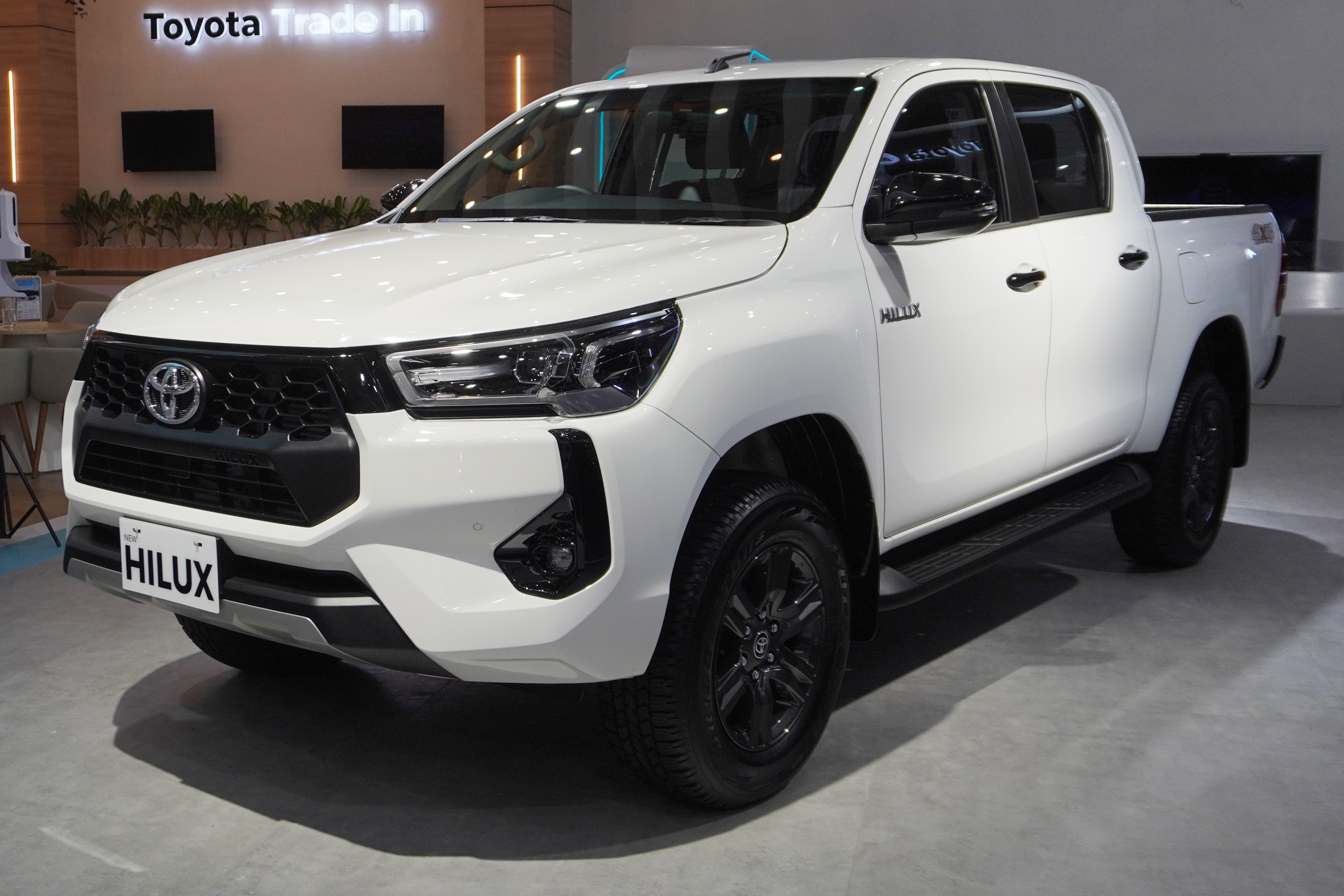
Front

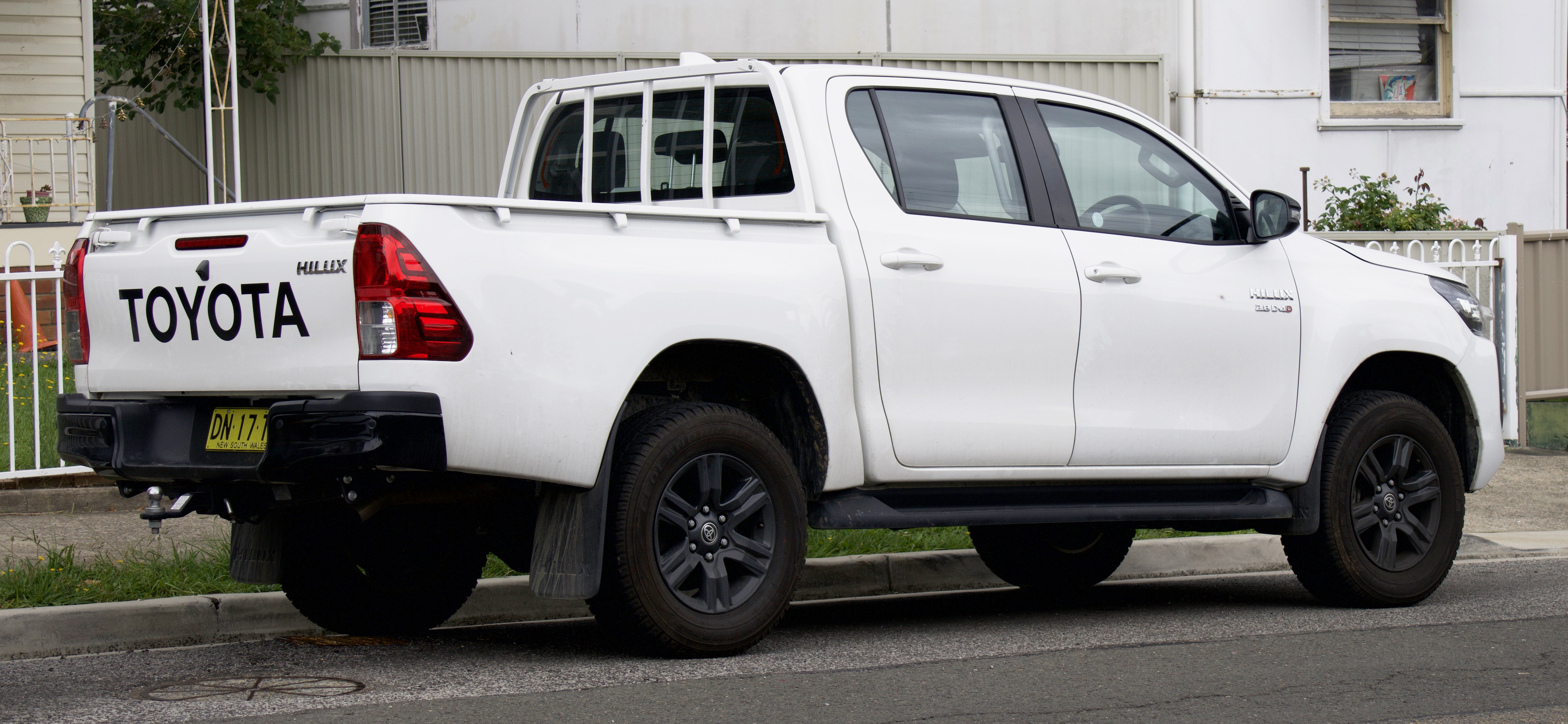
2024 facelift

=== GR Sport ===
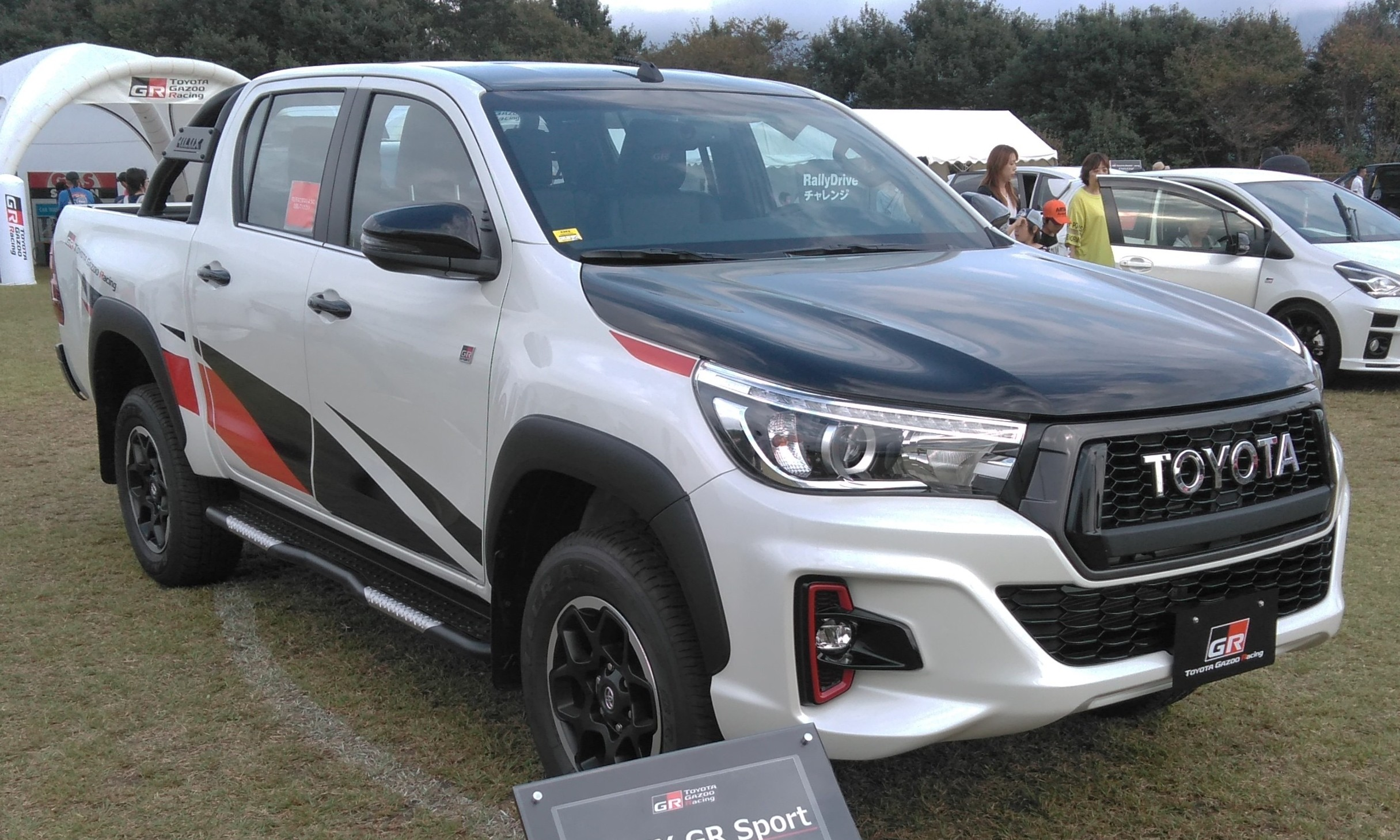
Pre-facelift Hilux GR Sport

The GR Sport version of the Hilux was first released in São Paulo, Brazil in November 2018. It is based on the flagship SRX variant available in South America with additional stiffer front springs, monotube dampers, Gazoo Racing exterior graphics, a new design honeycomb grille insert with 'Toyota' badging, matte black wheel arch extensions, a black bonnet and roof, side steps, 17-inch alloy wheels with all-terrain tyres, and GR badging, without performance upgrades.

The GR Sport version based on the 2020 facelift model was released in Thailand on 25 August 2021, in Japan on 8 October 2021, in the Philippines in October 2021, in Europe in January 2022, in Indonesia in December 2022 and in Pakistan in March 2023. The model was also released in South Africa in September 2022, with the 1GD-FTV engine further upgraded to produce 224 PS (165 kW; 221 hp) and 550 N⋅m (56.1 kg⋅m; 406 lb⋅ft).

In January 2023, a specialised GR Sport model for the Australian market was released. It received a different styling compared to the Hilux GR Sport in other markets, with more off-road-focused upgrades such as extended wheel-arch fender flares, wider track, heavy-duty suspension, and heavy-duty 'rock sliders' instead of side-steps. Powered with the 2.8-litre diesel engine, it is upgraded to produce 224 PS (165 kW; 221 hp) and 550 N⋅m (56.1 kg⋅m; 406 lb⋅ft).

To commemorate Toyota Gazoo’s 9th Safari Rally victory in 2021, the Hilux GR Safari Rally limited edition was released in Kenya by CFAO Motors Toyota, available in automatic and manual with GR's racing colours (black, red, and white).

Facelift version

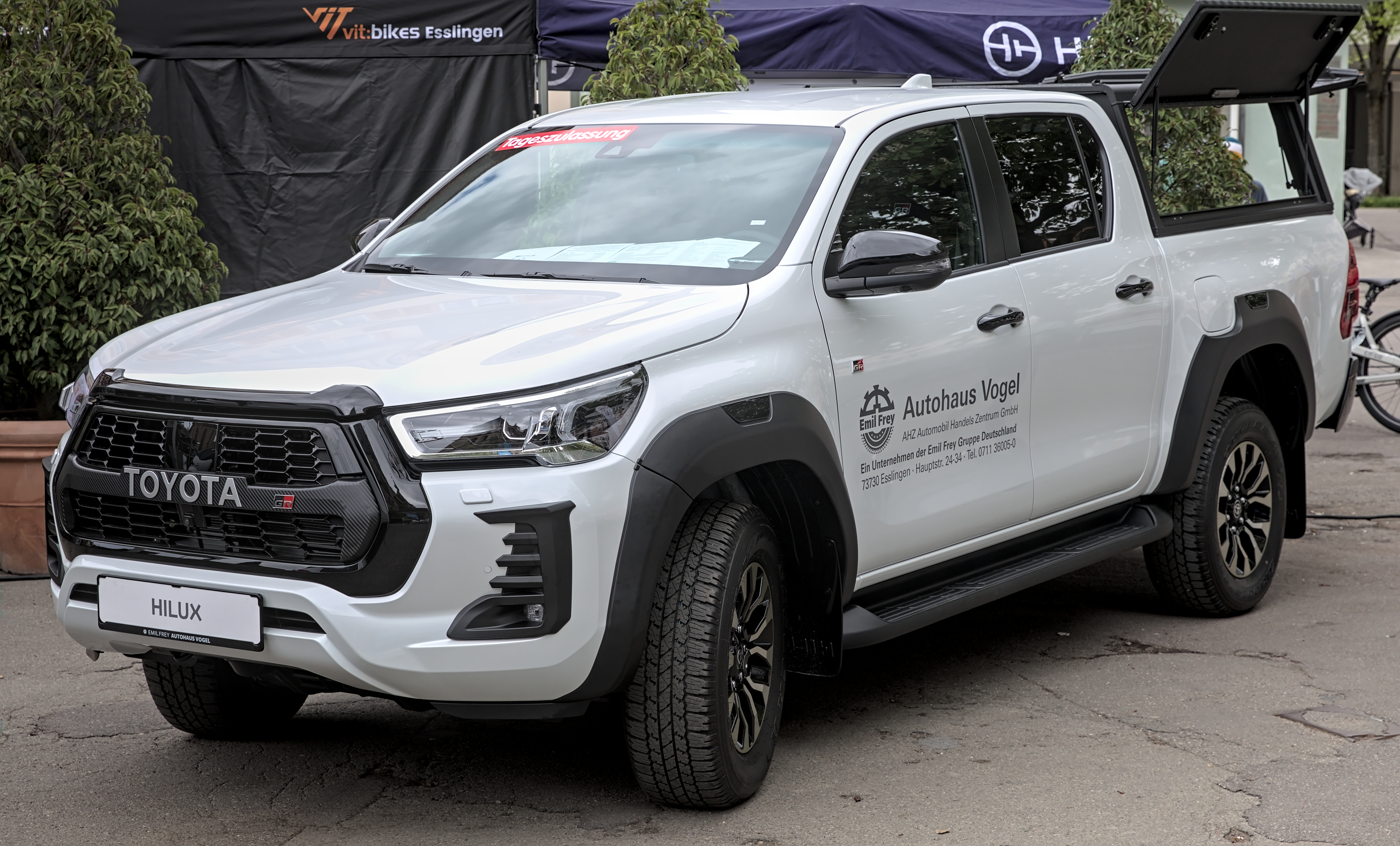
Front (European-market version)

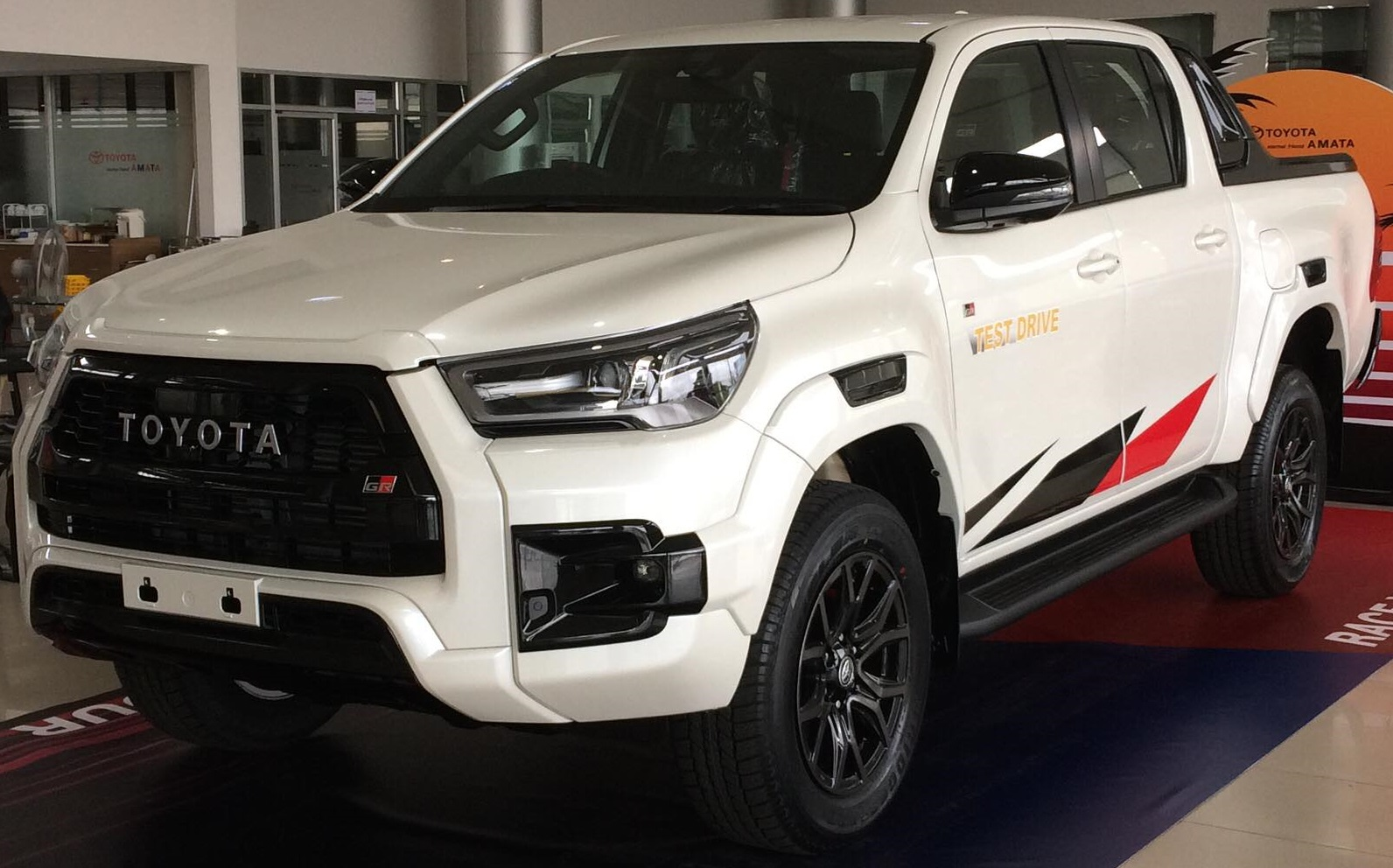
Front (Global version)

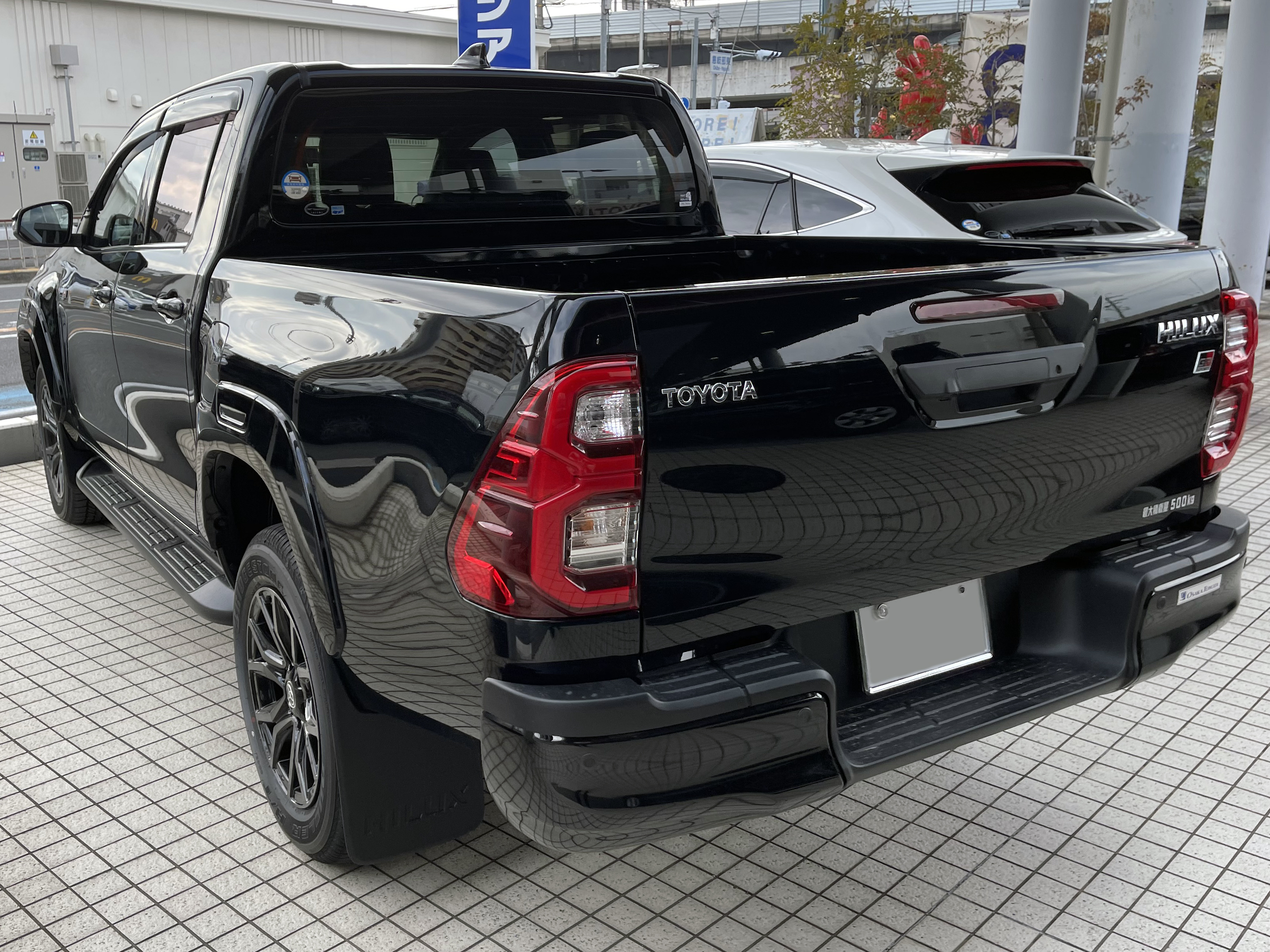
Rear

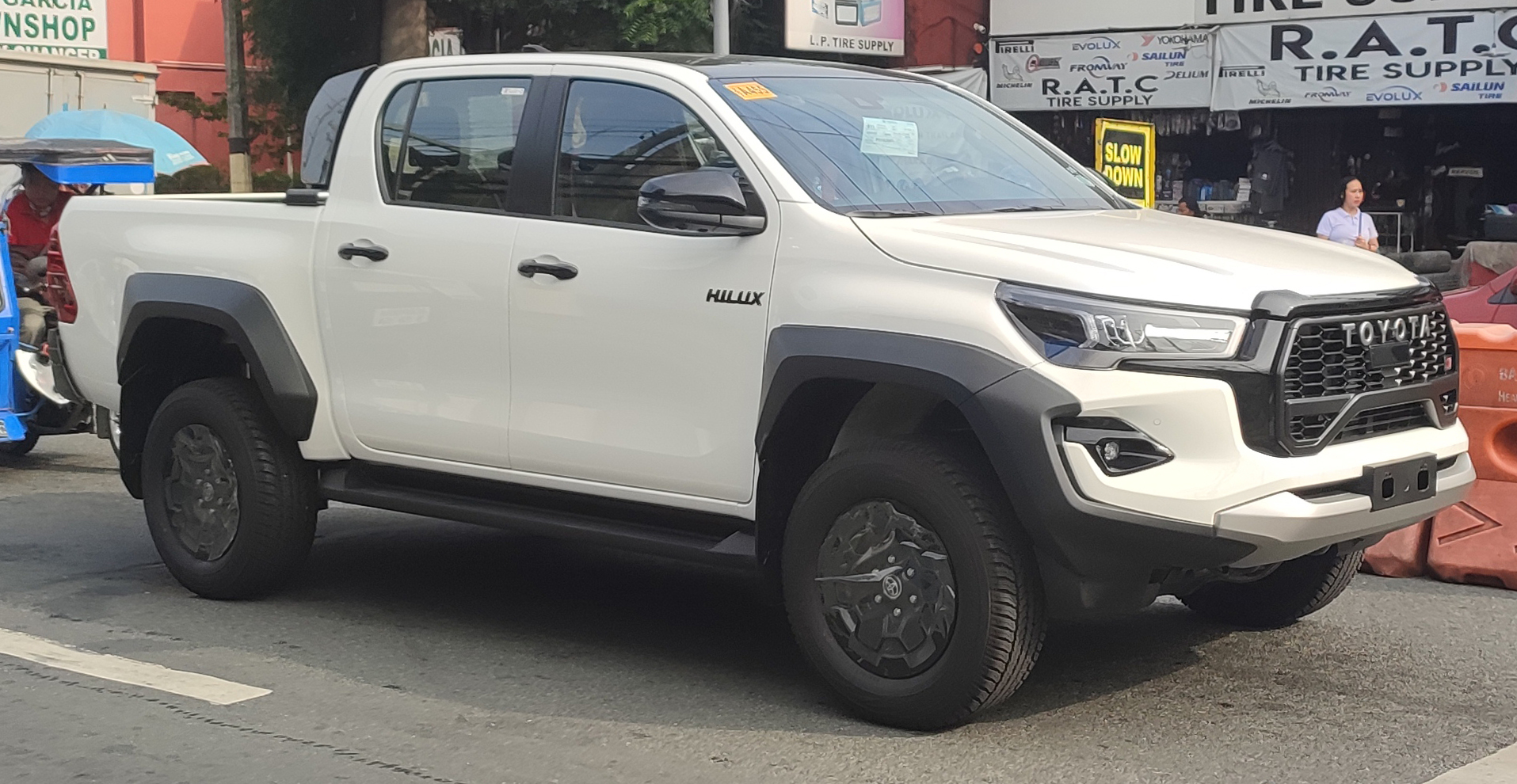
HiLux GR Sport (Philippines)

=== Hilux Revo BEV Concept ===
The Hilux Revo BEV Concept is an EV conversion prototype based on the eighth-generation Hilux (Hilux Revo in Thailand) single cab that was presented on 14 December 2022 at the 60th anniversary event of Toyota Motor Thailand.

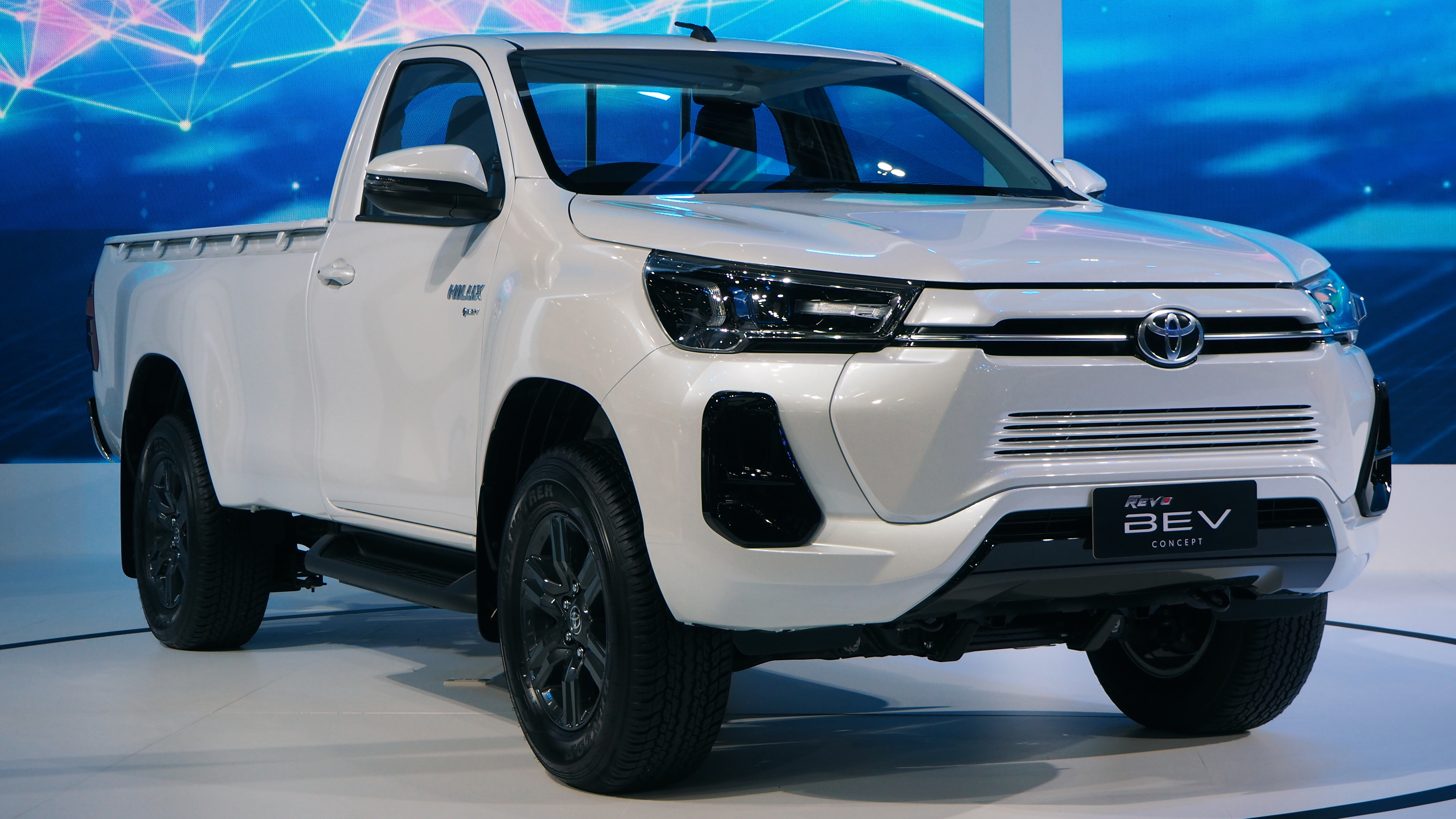
Hilux Revo BEV Concept (Thailand)

=== Hilux FCEV concept ===
2024 Toyota Hilux FCEV Concept at Goodwood Festival of Speed 2024

The Hilux FCEV concept is a hydrogen powered fuel cell electric vehicle (FCEV) prototype based on the eighth-generation Hilux two-wheel drive space-cab. It was unveiled in September 2023 and was developed in the UK at Toyota Manufacturing UK's Burnaston car plant with funding provided by the UK government. The prototype uses the same powertrain as Toyota's full production FCEV the Mirai and has three high-pressure fuel tanks with an expected range of more than 365 miles (587 km). Toyota said it would produce ten prototypes for testing by the end of 2023.

=== Powertrain ===
The model is available with the newly developed 2.4-litre and 2.8-litre GD series diesel engines, combined with a 6-speed manual transmission or a 6-speed automatic transmission with sequential shift technology. The manual model, touted as an "intelligent" manual helps eliminate shift shock by matching engine revs to the transmission speed. The 2.8-litre GD engine was introduced in May 2015 at the 36th International Vienna Motor Symposium. The GD engines are equipped common-rail direct-injection, variable-nozzle turbos, exhaust gas recirculation and an optional stop/start system. It is claimed to use 10 percent less fuel than the older KD engines.

The older KD series 2.5-litre along with 3.0-litre diesel engines was offered in several market alongside the newer GD series engines. The 2.0-litre, 2.7-litre and 4.0-litre petrol engines from the previous generation returned with a Dual VVT-i update for increased power and torque. As of December 2022, the 5L-E engine option is marketed by Toyota Gibraltar Stockholdings along with other distributors in Africa such as French West Africa, and for institutional purchase by governmental entities and NGOs accredited by the UN, only with a 5-speed manual transmission, four-wheel drive and left-hand drive only.

Model	Engine	Transmission	Power	Torque
2.0	2.0 L 1TR-FE inline-4 fuel-injected petrol with Dual VVT-i	6-speed manual	104 kW (139 hp; 141 PS) at 5,500 rpm	185 N⋅m (136 lb⋅ft; 18.9 kg⋅m) at 3,800 rpm
2.0	2.0 L 1TR-FE inline-4 fuel-injected petrol with Dual VVT-i	6-speed AC60E/AC60F automatic	104 kW (139 hp; 141 PS) at 5,500 rpm	185 N⋅m (136 lb⋅ft; 18.9 kg⋅m) at 3,800 rpm
2.4	2.4 L 2GD-FTV inline-4 common rail diesel with VNT	5-speed R151 manual	110 kW; 150 PS (150 hp) at 3,400 rpm	343 N⋅m (253 lb⋅ft; 35.0 kg⋅m) at 1,400–2,800 rpm
2.4	2.4 L 2GD-FTV inline-4 common rail diesel with VNT	6-speed RC60/RC60F manual	110 kW; 150 PS (150 hp) at 3,400 rpm	400 N⋅m (300 lb⋅ft; 41 kg⋅m) at 1,600–2,000 rpm
2.4	2.4 L 2GD-FTV inline-4 common rail diesel with VNT	6-speed AC60E/AC60F automatic	110 kW; 150 PS (150 hp) at 3,400 rpm	400 N⋅m (300 lb⋅ft; 41 kg⋅m) at 1,600–2,000 rpm
2.5	2.5 L 2KD-FTV inline-4 common rail diesel without intercooler	5-speed R151 manual	76 kW; 103 PS (102 hp) at 3,600 rpm	200 N⋅m (150 lb⋅ft; 20 kg⋅m) at 1,600–3,600 rpm
2.5	2.5 L 2KD-FTV inline-4 common rail diesel without intercooler	6-speed RC61 manual	76 kW; 103 PS (102 hp) at 3,600 rpm	260 N⋅m (190 lb⋅ft; 27 kg⋅m) at 1,600–2,400 rpm
2.5	2.5 L 2KD-FTV inline-4 common rail diesel with VNT	6-speed manual	107 kW; 146 PS (144 hp) at 3,400 rpm	343 N⋅m (253 lb⋅ft; 35.0 kg⋅m) at 1,800–3,400 rpm
2.5	2.5 L 2KD-FTV inline-4 common rail diesel with VNT	5-speed A750F automatic	107 kW; 146 PS (144 hp) at 3,400 rpm	343 N⋅m (253 lb⋅ft; 35.0 kg⋅m) at 1,800–3,400 rpm
2.7	2.7 L 2TR-FE inline-4 fuel-injected petrol with Dual VVT-i	6-speed manual	120 kW (160 hp; 160 PS) at 5,500 rpm	246 N⋅m (181 lb⋅ft; 25.1 kg⋅m) at 3,800 rpm
2.7	2.7 L 2TR-FE inline-4 fuel-injected petrol with Dual VVT-i	6-speed AC60E/AC60F automatic	120 kW (160 hp; 160 PS) at 5,500 rpm	246 N⋅m (181 lb⋅ft; 25.1 kg⋅m) at 3,800 rpm
2.8	2.8 L 1GD-FTV inline-4 common rail diesel with VNT	5-speed R151 manual	130 kW; 170 PS (170 hp)	343 N⋅m (253 lb⋅ft; 35.0 kg⋅m) at 1,200–3,400 rpm
2.8	2.8 L 1GD-FTV inline-4 common rail diesel with VNT	6-speed RC61 manual / RC61F iMT (Intelligent Manual Transmission) manual (Thailand)	132 kW; 179 PS (177 hp) at 3,400 rpm 2nd facelift: 150 kW; 204 PS (201 hp) at 3,400 rpm GR Sport (South Africa/Australia): 165 kW; 224 PS (221 hp) at 3,400 rpm	420 N⋅m (310 lb⋅ft; 43 kg⋅m) at 1,400–2,600 rpm 2nd facelift: 420 N⋅m (310 lb⋅ft; 43 kg⋅m) at 1,400–3,400 rpm
2.8	2.8 L 1GD-FTV inline-4 common rail diesel with VNT	6-speed AC60E/AC60F automatic	132 kW; 179 PS (177 hp) at 3,400 rpm 2nd facelift: 150 kW; 204 PS (201 hp) at 3,400 rpm GR Sport (South Africa/Australia): 165 kW; 224 PS (221 hp) at 3,400 rpm	450 N⋅m (330 lb⋅ft; 46 kg⋅m) at 1,600–2,400 rpm 2nd facelift: 500 N⋅m (370 lb⋅ft; 51 kg⋅m) at 1,600–2,800 rpm GR Sport (South Africa/Australia): 550 N⋅m (410 lb⋅ft; 56 kg⋅m) at 1,600–2,800 rpm
3.0	3.0 L 5L-E inline-4 naturally aspirated diesel	5-speed manual	71 kW; 96 PS (95 hp) at 4,000 rpm	197 N⋅m (145 lb⋅ft; 20.1 kg⋅m) at 2,200 rpm
3.0	3.0 L 1KD-FTV inline-4 common rail diesel with VNT	6-speed RC61 manual	122 kW; 165 PS (163 hp) at 3,400 rpm	343 N⋅m (253 lb⋅ft; 35.0 kg⋅m) at 1,600–3,400 rpm
3.0	3.0 L 1KD-FTV inline-4 common rail diesel with VNT	5-speed A750F automatic	122 kW; 165 PS (163 hp) at 3,400 rpm	360 N⋅m (270 lb⋅ft; 37 kg⋅m) at 1,800–3,400 rpm
4.0	4.0 L 1GR-FE V6 fuel-injected petrol with VVT-i	6-speed RC61 manual	175 kW (235 hp; 238 PS) at 5,200 rpm	376 N⋅m (277 lb⋅ft; 38.3 kg⋅m) at 3,700 rpm
4.0	4.0 L 1GR-FE V6 fuel-injected petrol with VVT-i	6-speed AC60E/AC60F automatic	175 kW (235 hp; 238 PS) at 5,200 rpm	376 N⋅m (277 lb⋅ft; 38.3 kg⋅m) at 3,700 rpm

=== Safety ===
The updated Hilux in its most basic Latin American market configuration with 7 airbags received 5 stars for both adult occupants and 5 stars for infants from Latin NCAP 2.0 in 2019.

Latin NCAP 1.5 test results Toyota Hilux / SW4 / Fortuner + 3 Airbags (2015, similar to Euro NCAP 2002)
Test	Points	Stars
Adult occupant:	15.71/17.0	5 /5 stars
Child occupant:	44.25/49.00	5 /5 stars

Latin NCAP 2.0 test results Toyota Hilux Double Cab / SW4 + 7 Airbags (2019, based on Euro NCAP 2008)
Test	Points	Stars
Adult occupant:	31.63/34.0	5 /5 stars
Child occupant:	44.25/49.00	5 /5 stars

ASEAN NCAP test results Toyota Hilux (2015)
Test	Points	Stars
Adult occupant:	14.53	4 /5 stars
Child occupant:	71%	4 /5 stars
Safety assist:	NA	

ASEAN NCAP test results Toyota Hilux (2015)
Test	Points	Stars
Adult occupant:	14.53	5 /5 stars
Child occupant:	71%	4 /5 stars
Safety assist:	NA	

ASEAN NCAP test results Toyota Hilux (2020)
Test	Points
Overall:	5 /5 stars
Adult occupant:	45.74
Child occupant:	22.47
Safety assist:	15.21

Euro NCAP test results* Toyota Hilux 2.4D 4x4 (mid-grade) (Double Cab) (2016)
Test	Points	%
Overall:	3 /5 stars	
Adult occupant:	32.6	85%
Child occupant:	40.3	82%
Pedestrian:	30.9	73%
Safety assist:	3	25%

ANCAP test results* Toyota Hilux (2015)
Test	Score
Overall	5 /5 stars
Frontal offset	13.45/16
Side impact	16/16
Pole	2/2
Seat belt reminders	3/3
Whiplash protection	Good
Pedestrian protection	Good
Electronic stability control	Standard

ANCAP test results* Toyota Hilux Rugged & Rugged X variants (2015)
Test	Score
Overall	5 /5 stars
Frontal offset	13.45/16
Side impact	16/16
Pole	2/2
Seat belt reminders	3/3
Whiplash protection	Good
Pedestrian protection	Marginal
Electronic stability control	Standard

ANCAP test results* Toyota Hilux all variants excluding GR Sport (2019, aligned with Euro NCAP)
Test	Points	%
Overall:	5 /5 stars	
Adult occupant:	36.6	96%
Child occupant:	42.6	87%
Pedestrian:	42.2	88%
Safety assist:	10.1	78%

== Ninth generation (AN220, AN230; 2025) ==
Ninth generation
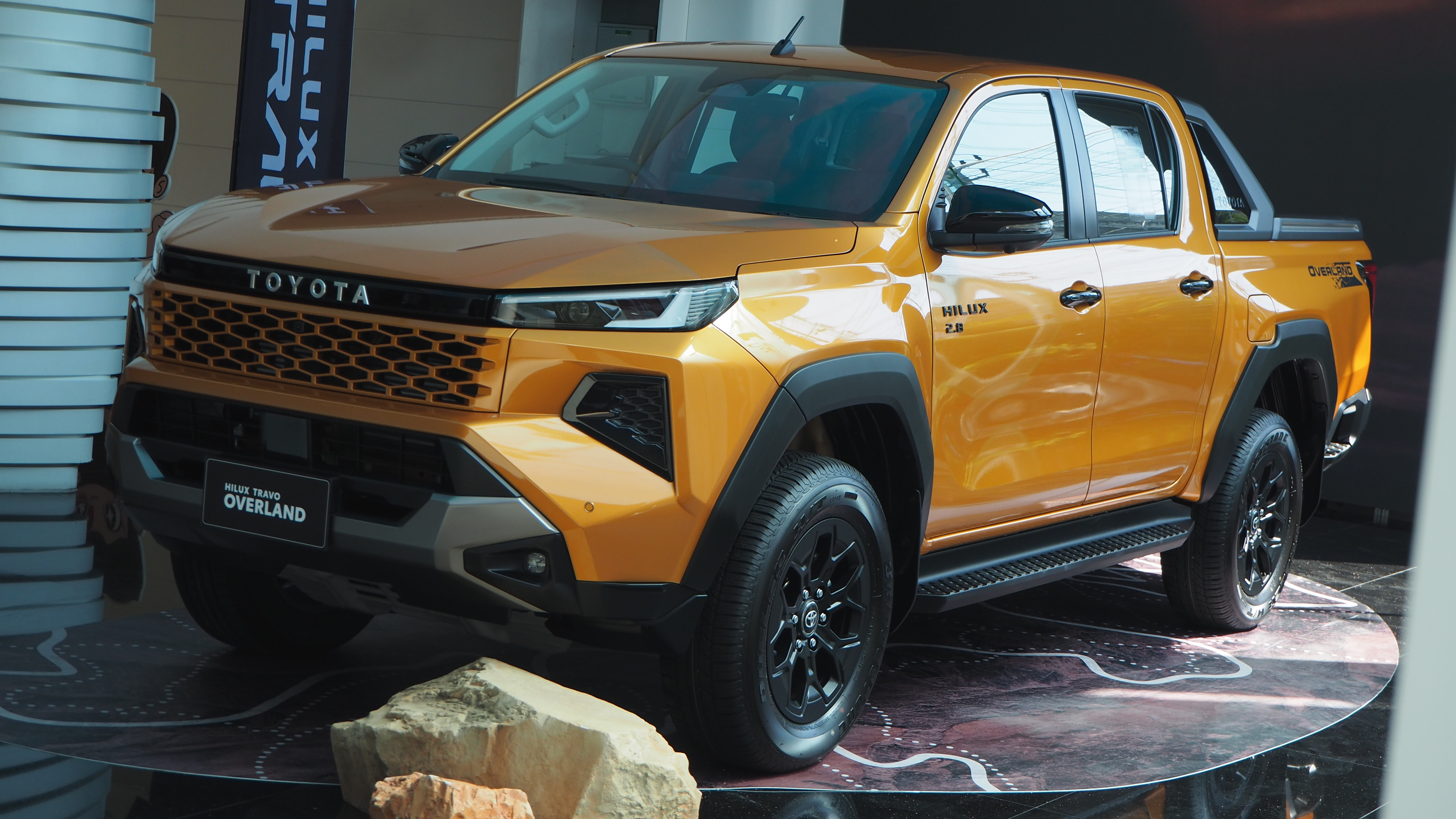
- 2025 Toyota Hilux Travo Overland (GUN226)

Overview
- Model code: AN220; AN230
- Production: 2025–present
- Assembly: Thailand: Ban Pho; Samrong Tai (TMT); South Africa: Prospecton (TSAM); Cambodia: Phnom Penh (TTMC); India: Bidadi (TKM)
- Designer: Nicolas Hogios

Body and chassis
- Body style: 2-door pickup truck; 4-door pickup truck
- Layout: Front-engine, rear-wheel-drive; Front-engine, four-wheel-drive; Dual-motor, all-wheel-drive (BEV/Travo-e)
- Platform: Toyota IMV
- Related: Toyota Hilux Champ; Toyota Land Cruiser FJ

Powertrain
- Engine: Petrol: 2.7 L 2TR-FE I4; 4.0 L 1GR-FE V6; Diesel: 2.8 L 1GD-FTV turbo I4
- Electric motor: 2x permanent magnet synchronous
- Power output: 120 kW (161 hp; 163 PS) (2.7 L 2TR-FE petrol); 150 kW (201 hp; 204 PS) (2.8 L 1GD-FTV diesel); 144 kW (193 hp; 196 PS) (BEV/Travo-e)
- Transmission: 6-speed RC60/RC61 manual; 6-speed AC60 "Super Intelligent ECT" automatic
- Hybrid drivetrain: Mild hybrid (diesel)
- Battery: 59.2-kWh lithium-ion (BEV/Travo-e)
- Range: 240 km (149 mi) (BEV/Travo-e, WLTP); 300 km (186 mi) (BEV/Travo-e, NEDC)

Dimensions
- Wheelbase: 3,085 mm (121.5 in) (long-wheelbase)
- Length: 5,320 mm (209.4 in) (long-wheelbase)
- Width: 1,855 mm (73.0 in)
- Height: 1,815 mm (71.5 in); 1,800 mm (70.9 in) (BEV/Travo-e)
- Curb weight: 2,140–2,190 kg (4,718–4,828 lb)

The ninth-generation Hilux was introduced on 10 November 2025 simultaneously in Thailand, Europe and Australia. The exterior was designed by Toyota Australia. Chief Engineer Anyarat Sutthibenjakul led the development of this 9th Generation Hilux.

Toyota announced BEV and FCEV variants to be launched in 2026 and 2028 respectively.

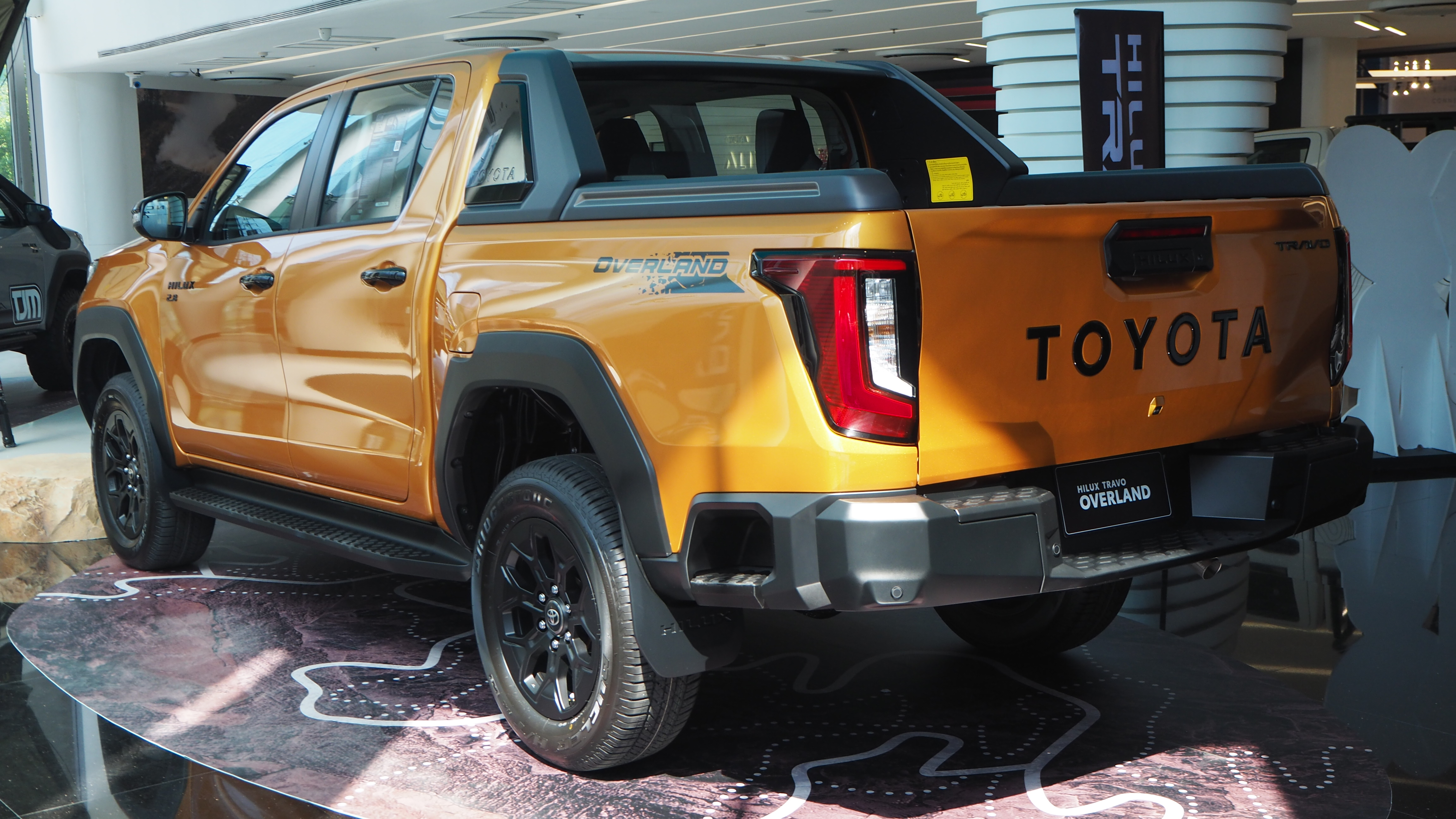
Rear view (Overland)

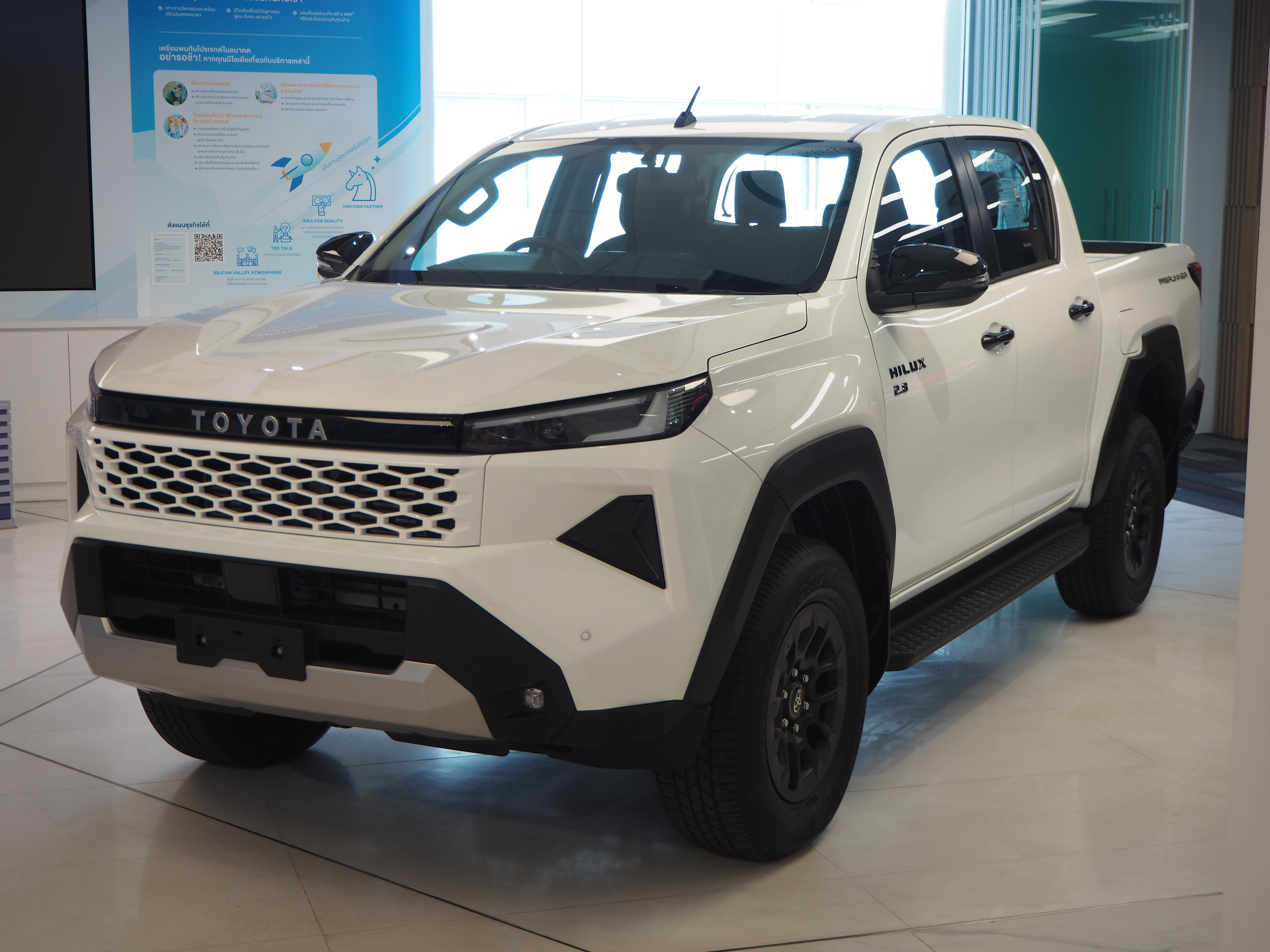
2025 Hilux Travo Prerunner

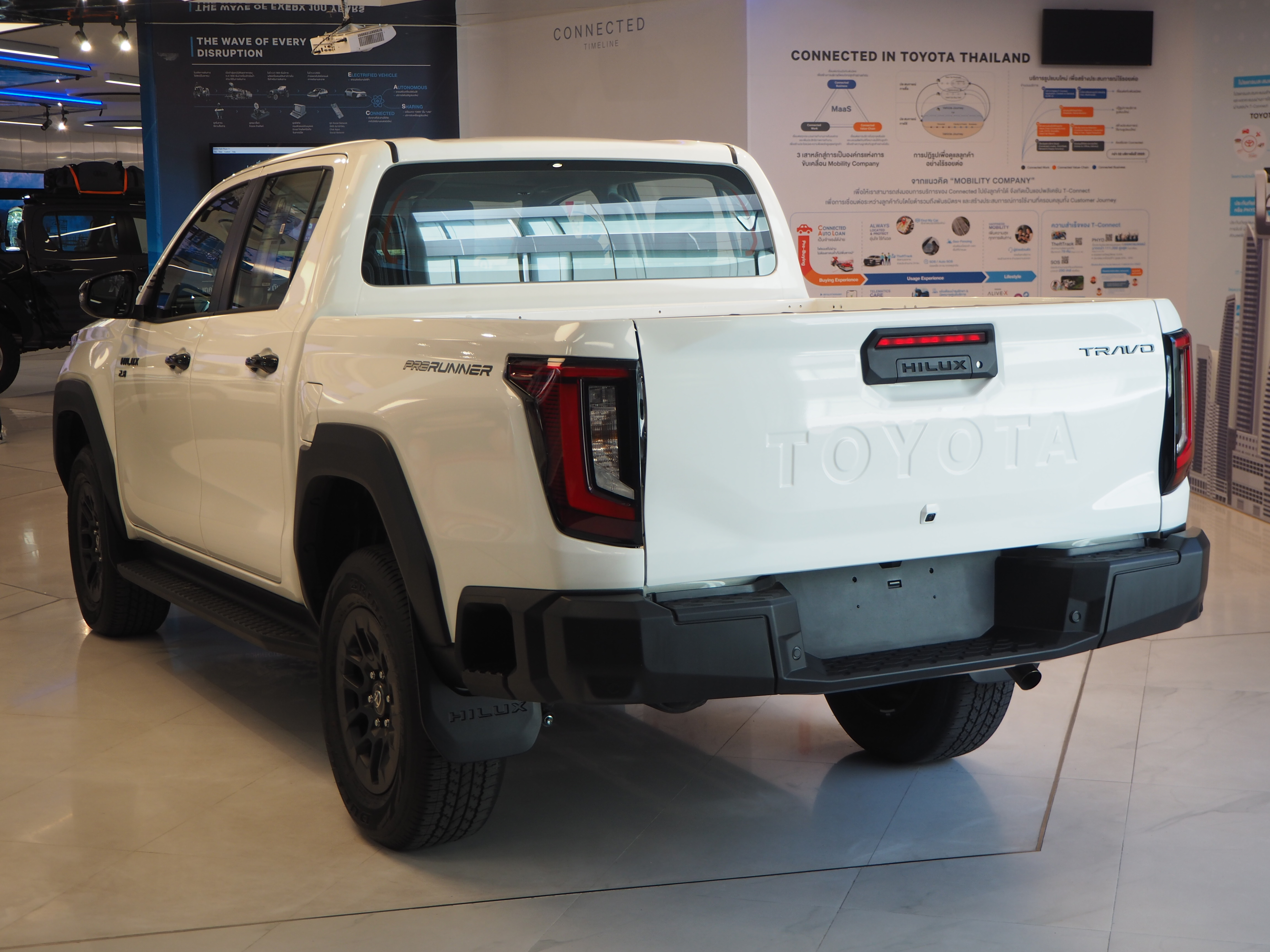
Rear view (Prerunner)

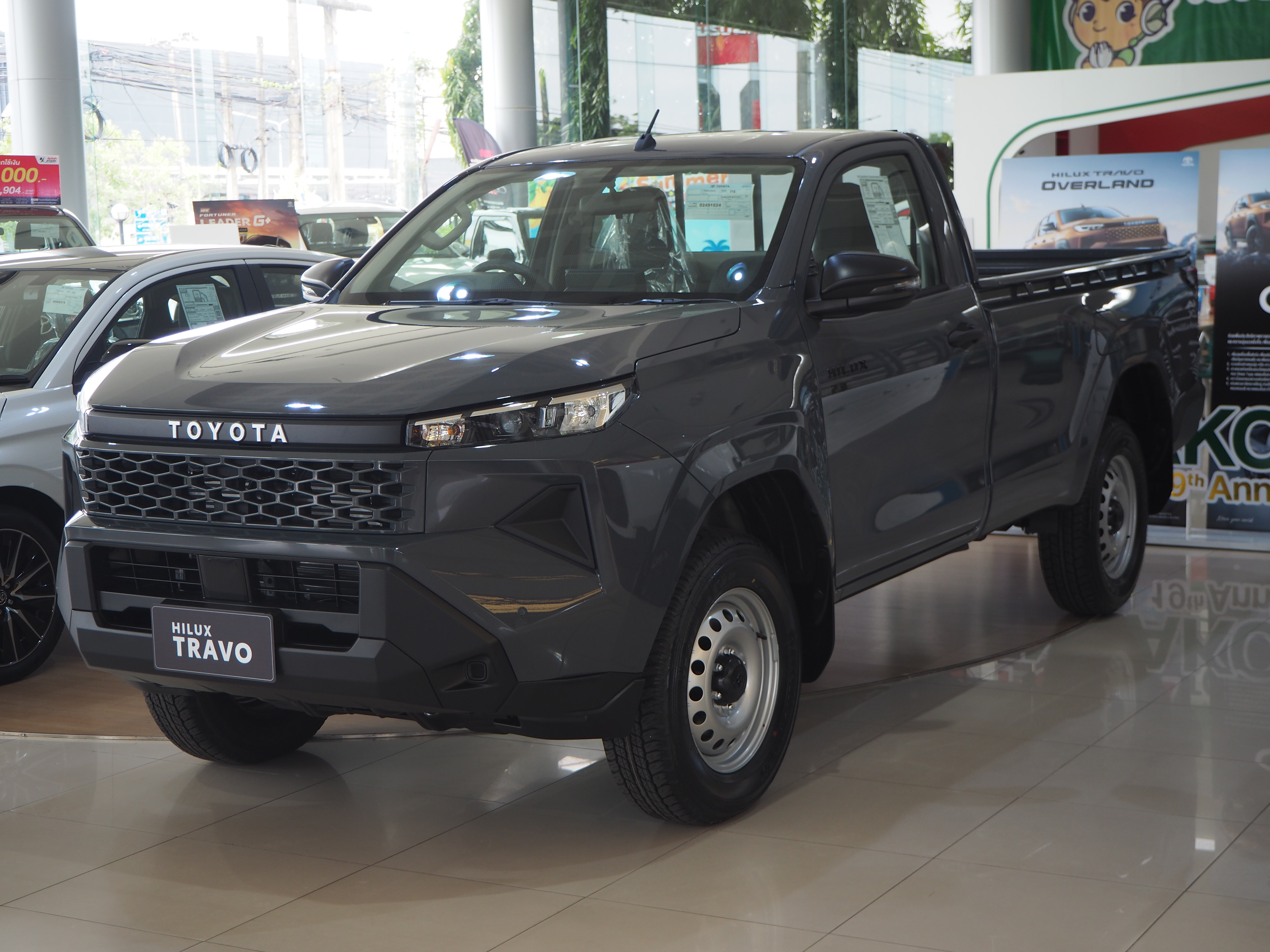
2025 Hilux Travo single cab

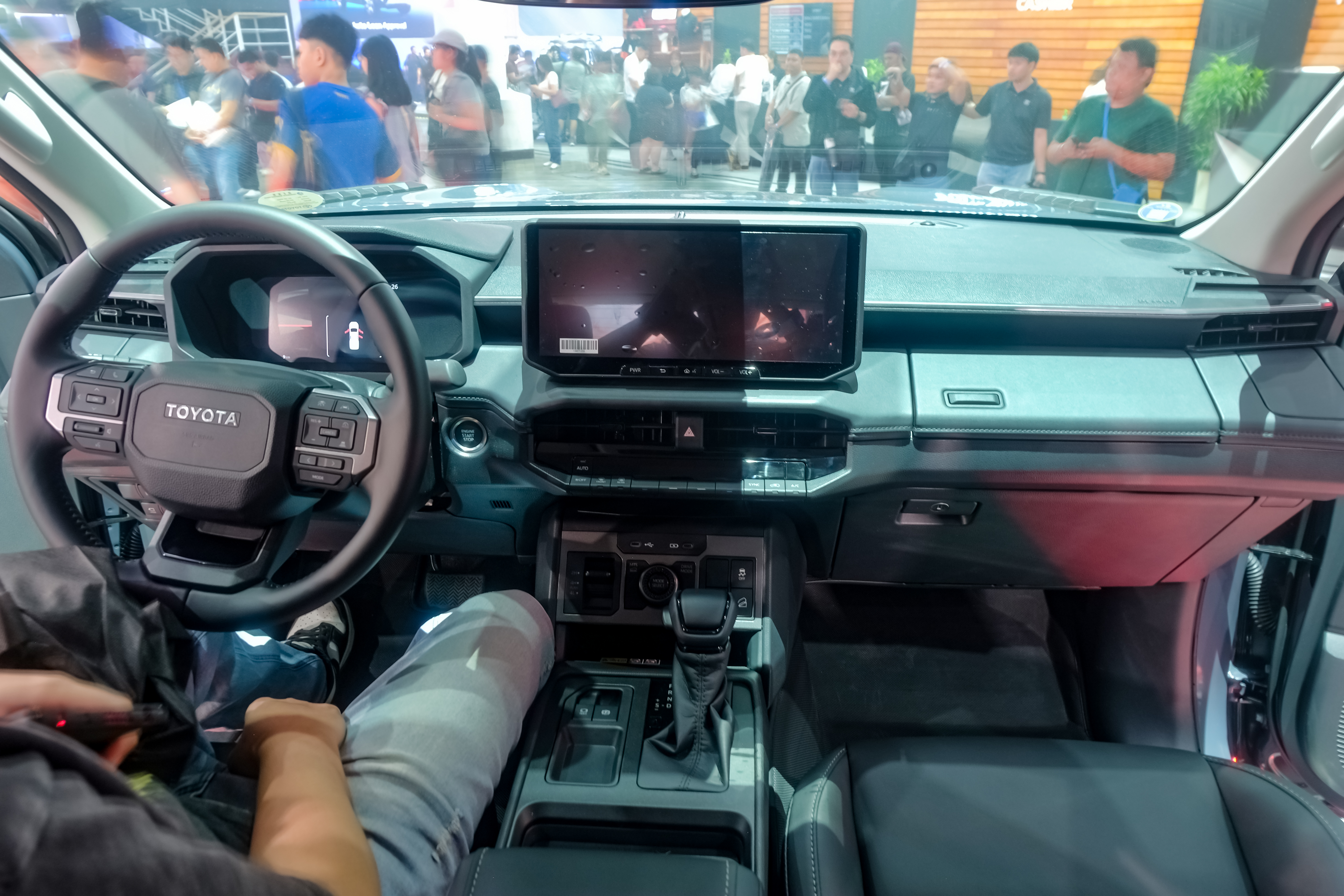
Interior

=== Powertrain ===
All engines for the ninth-generation Hilux are inline-four engines. The 2.8-litre 1GD-FTV turbo-diesel unit producing 150 kW (201 hp; 204 PS) is standard on all models. It produces 500 N⋅m (51 kg⋅m; 369 lb⋅ft) of torque if equipped with an automatic transmission and 420 N⋅m (43 kg⋅m; 310 lb⋅ft) for a manual transmission. The 2.7-litre 2TR-FE petrol unit from the previous generation remains available in certain markets.

=== Battery electric ===
A battery electric version (model code XPN225), marketed as the Hilux BEV in export markets and as the Hilux Travo-e in Thailand is available, powered by dual-motor all-wheel drive layout.

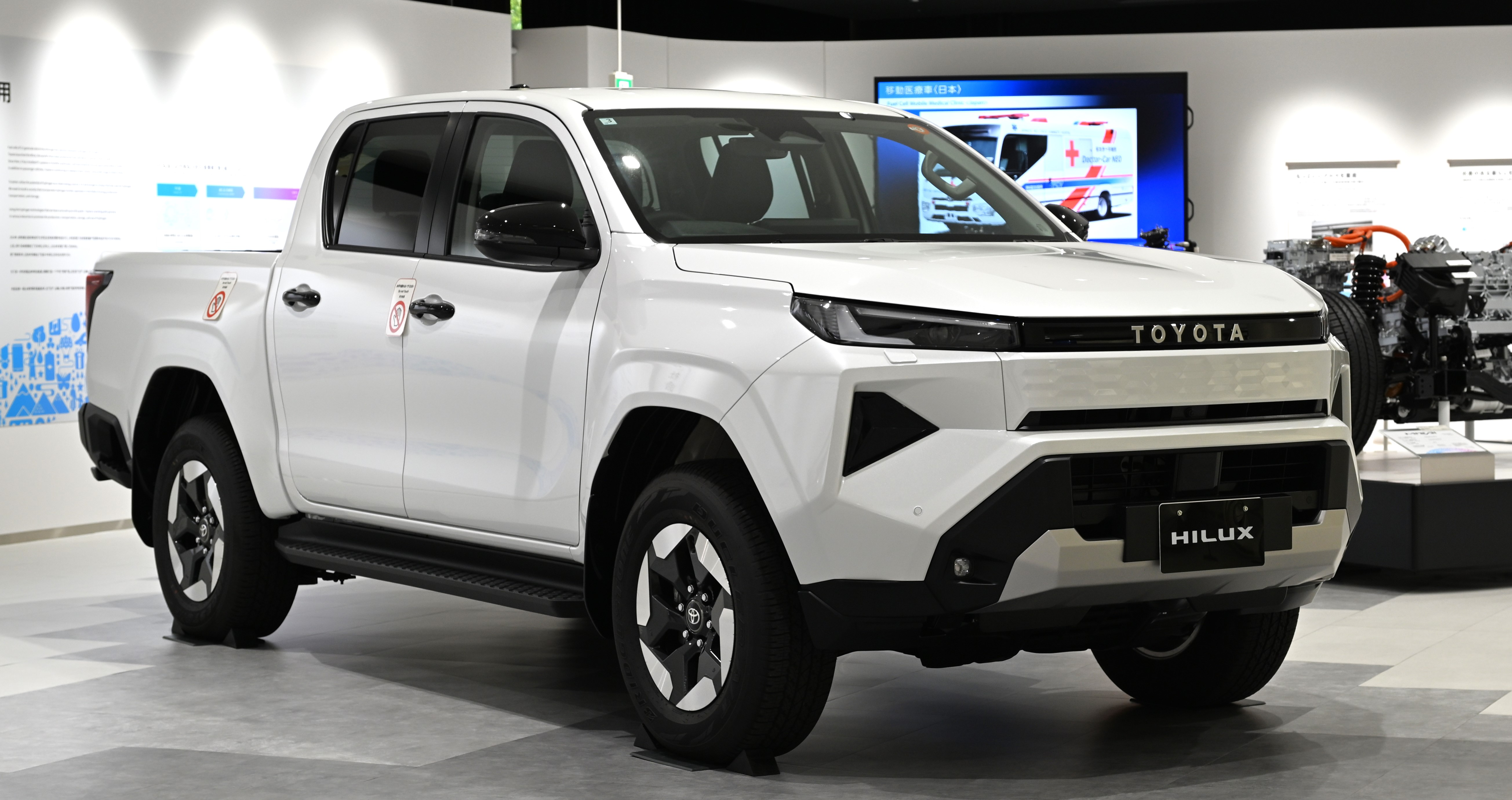
2026 Hilux BEV Z (Japan)

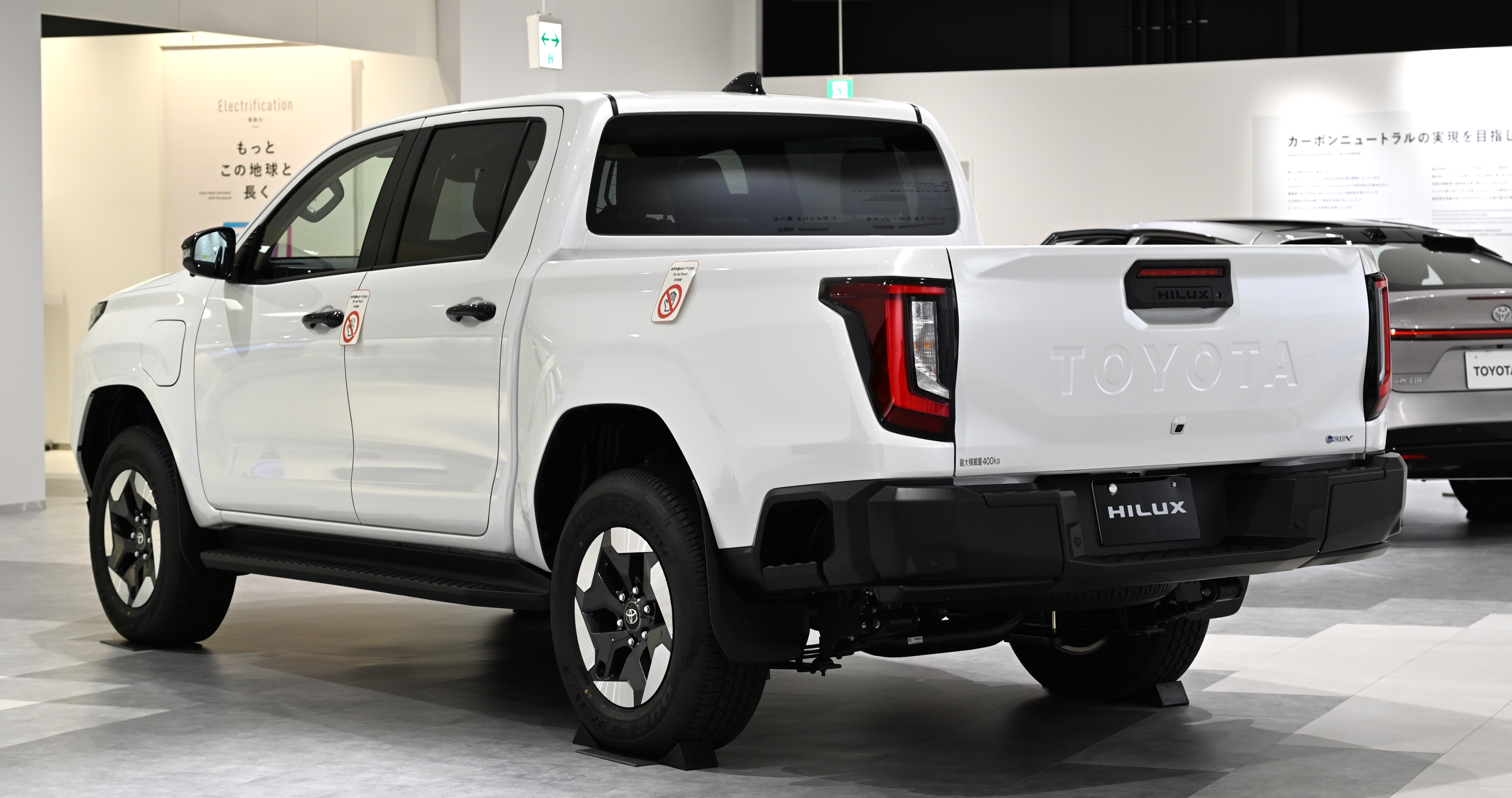
Rear view

Interior

=== Markets ===
==== Asia ====
===== Japan =====
The ninth-generation Hilux went on sale in Japan on 28 May 2026. The Hilux is equipped with a 2.8-litre turbocharged diesel engine (1GD-FTV) equipped with 4TREX four-wheel drive as standard. It is only available in the Double Cab body, in "Z" and "Z Adventure" trims.

===== Brunei =====
The ninth-generation Hilux was launched in Brunei on 14 August 2026. The Hilux is offered with a 2.8-litre turbocharged diesel engine equipped with four-wheel-drive as standard. It is only available in the Double Cab body, in Mid trim came with manual or automatic transmission options and High trim came with automatic option only.

===== Cambodia =====
The ninth-generation Hilux also adopted a moniker as Hilux Travo was launched in Cambodia on 2 July 2026, with local assembly for the Cambodian market. It is available in Double Cab body configurations, with three grades: Rally, V-Edition and L-Edition. All grades variant are powered by the 2.8-litre turbocharged diesel engine (1GD-FTV), with 4TREX four-wheel drive standard.

===== India =====
Toyota Kirloskar Motor launched the ninth-generation Hilux in India on 28 July 2026. The Indian-market model is offered with the 2.8-litre turbocharged diesel engine as the previous generation model, along with updated exterior styling, a redesigned interior, and additional safety and technology features. It is available in three grades: GX 4x2, GX 4x4 and VX 4x4. It is available exclusively with a 6-speed automatic transmission.

===== Indonesia =====
The ninth-generation Hilux and its Battery EV version was launched in Indonesia on 29 June 2026, replacing the eighth-generation Hilux. A 2.8-litre turbocharged diesel engine (1GD-FTV) and 4TREX four-wheel drive is standard on all variants except the Battery EV variant which is equipped with all-wheel-drive. It is available in both Double Cab and Single Cab configurations. The Double Cab configuration is offered in three trims: E, G and V. Both E and G trims are equipped with 6-speed manual transmissions, while the V trim is equipped with a 6-speed automatic transmission. For the Single Cab configuration, it is offered in the sole E trim with the same 6-speed manual transmission.

===== Kazakhstan =====
The ninth-generation Hilux was launched in Kazakhstan on 2 June 2026, it is available in Double Cab and four-wheel drive configuration only, in the sole Comfort trim, with the 2.7-litre petrol engine (2TR-FE).

===== Laos =====
The ninth-generation Hilux also adopted a moniker as Hilux Travo was launched in Laos on 12 June 2026. Imported from Thailand, it is available in Standard Cab, Smart Cab and Double Cab body configurations, with five grades: 4TREX (Mid/Hi/Hi-Premium), Prerunner (Hi) and the battery electric Hilux Travo-e. All grades except for the BEV variant are powered by the 2.8-litre turbocharged diesel engine (1GD-FTV). It will be locally assembled in the country beginning in 2028.

===== Malaysia =====
The ninth-generation Hilux was launched in Malaysia on 2 April 2026, in the sole battery electric EV variant fully imported from Thailand.

===== Philippines =====
The ninth-generation Hilux was launched in the Philippines on 4 June 2026 at the 2026 Philippine International Motor Show. It is only available in a Double Cab configuration, with five grades: E, G, Conquest, V and the battery electric Hilux BEV. All grades except for the BEV variant are powered by the 2.8-litre turbocharged diesel engine (1GD-FTV), with 4TREX four-wheel drive standard on the E 4x4, V 4x4, and Conquest 4x4 variants.

Sales commenced on 22 July 2026.

===== Taiwan =====
The ninth-generation Hilux was launched in Taiwan on 25 May 2026, is available in the sole Double Cab 4WD variant, with the 2.8-litre turbocharged diesel engine (1GD-FTV).

===== Thailand =====
In Thailand, the Hilux Travo is available in Standard Cab, Smart Cab and Double Cab body configurations. The Standard Cab is available in the sole unnamed trim, equipped with 4TREX four-wheel drive as standard. The Smart Cab is available with Smart and Premium trims, with 4TREX four-wheel drive optional on the latter trim. The Double Cab is available with Smart, Premium, Overland and Overland Plus trims, with 4TREX four-wheel drive optional on the latter three trims.

The battery electric Hilux Travo-e comes in the Double Cab configuration and available in the sole variant.

===== Vietnam =====
The ninth-generation Hilux was launched in Vietnam on 29 January 2026, with three variants: Standard, Pro and Trailhunter. All variants are powered by the 2.8-litre turbocharged diesel engine (1GD-FTV), with 4TREX four-wheel-drive standard on the flagship Trailhunter variant.

==== Europe ====
The Hilux and Hilux BEV was unveiled in 2026 Brussels Motor Show The Hilux offered with, 2.8-litre 1GD-FTV with 48-volt mild hybrid. In selected European-markets, diesel and petrol variant also available.

==== Middle East ====
The ninth-generation Hilux was officially launched in the Middle East on 20 September 2026 Middle Eastern models are offered with a 2.7-litre petrol engine producing 164 hp (122 kW) and 245 N⋅m (181 lb⋅ft), a 2.8-litre turbocharged diesel producing 201 hp (150 kW) and 500 N⋅m (369 lb⋅ft), and, in some markets, a 4.0-litre petrol V6 producing 235 hp (175 kW) and 376 N⋅m (277 lb⋅ft). The regional range includes Single Cab and Double Cab body styles in grades such as GL, GLX, SGLX, Adventure, and Premium, with manual or automatic transmissions and four-wheel drive across the lineup.

==== Oceania ====
===== Australia =====
The ninth-generation Hilux went on sale in Australia on 9 December 2025, with five grades: WorkMate, SR, SR5, Rogue and Rugged X. In Australia, the Hilux is available in Single Cab, Extra Cab and Double Cab body configurations. The Extra Cab is available solely in the SR grade, equipped with 4TREX four-wheel drive as standard. The Double Cab is available with WorkMate, SR, SR5, Rogue and Rugged X grades, equipped with 4TREX four-wheel drive as standard but optional on the former two trims. For engines, all variants are powered by the 1GD-FTV 2.8-litre turbocharged diesel engine, which is also available with the mild-hybrid 48V system.

The Hilux BEV went on sale in Australia in July 2026, in SR and SR5 trims, with the target market for businesses as a fleet vehicle, such as mining and energy.

===== New Zealand =====
The ninth-generation Hilux went on sale in New Zealand on 13 November 2025, with four grades: SR, SR5, SR5 Limited and Adventure. In New Zealand, the Hilux is available in Single Cab, Extra Cab and Double Cab body configurations. The Single Cab is available solely in the SR trim, equipped with 4TREX four-wheel drive as standard. The Extra Cab is available solely in the SR trim, equipped with 4TREX four-wheel drive as standard. The Double Cab is available with SR, SR5, SR5 Limited and Adventure grades, equipped with 4TREX four-wheel drive as standard but optional on the SR grade. For engines, all variants are powered by the 1GD-FTV 2.8-litre turbocharged diesel engine, which is also available with the mild-hybrid 48V system.

==== Africa ====
===== South Africa =====
The ninth-generation Hilux was launched in South Africa on 8 June 2026. In South Africa, the Hilux is available in Xtra Cab and Double Cab body configurations. The Xtra Cab is only available in the Raider X trim, with 4TREX four-wheel drive optional. The Double Cab is available with SRX, Raider and Legend trims, with 4TREX four-wheel drive optional on all trims except for the Raider trim. For engines, all variants are powered by the 1GD-FTV 2.8-litre turbocharged diesel engine, which is also available with the mild-hybrid 48V system standard on the Double Cab Legend variants. In August 2026, the Single Cab body configuration was introduced to the line-up for the SRX trim and powered by the 1GD-FTV 2.8-litre turbocharged diesel engine.

==== Americas ====
===== Mexico =====
The ninth-generation Hilux was launched in Mexico on 6 August 2026, with four variants: Base, SR, Diesel M/T, Diesel A/T MHEV. In Mexico, the Hilux is only available in the Double Cab body configuration. For engines, the Base and SR variants use the 2.7-litre petrol engine (2TR-FE) and the diesel variants use the 2.8-litre turbocharged diesel engine (1GD-FTV), which is also available with the mild-hybrid 48V system on the flagship variant.

=== Safety ===
ANCAP test results Toyota Hilux all variants exc. Rugged X (2025, aligned with Euro NCAP)
Test	Points	%
Overall:	5 /5 stars	
Adult occupant:	33.96	84%
Child occupant:	44	89%
Pedestrian:	52.16	82%
Safety assist:	14.83	82%

== Hilux Champ (2023) ==
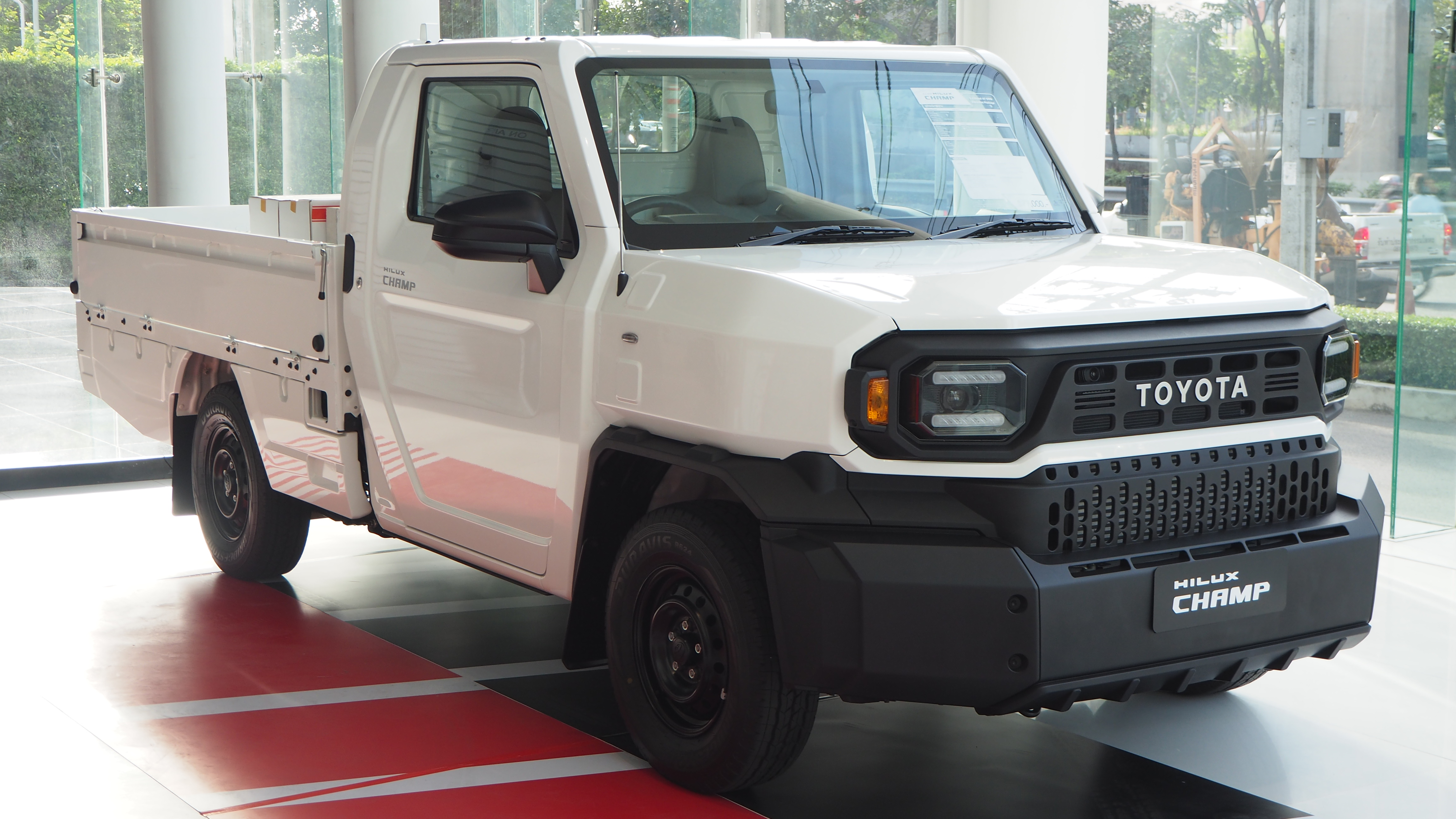
2023 Hilux Champ

The Toyota Hilux Champ is a two-door pickup truck or chassis cab positioned below the Hilux, and based on the IMV platform and chassis shared with the Hilux. It was first previewed as the IMV 0 concept in December 2022, and went on sale as the Hilux Champ in Thailand in November 2023.

== Production and sales ==
=== Worldwide production ===
Year	Production
1968	33,708
1969	48,041
1970	69,787
1971	77,865
1972	79,523
1973	75,541
1974	78,727
1975	115,466
1976	137,101
1977	215,696
1978	224,113
1979	237,309
1980	306,063
1981	302,580
1982	333,103
1983	345,117
1984	432,871
1985	461,253
1986	440,905
1987	383,688
1988	394,468
1989	374,387
1990	362,147
1991	344,501
1992	387,279
1993	405,752
1994	425,999
1995	384,571
1996	387,571
1997	351,417
1998	353,340
1999	358,793
2000	343,646
2001	363,354
2002	396,013
2003	276,172
2004	323,625
2005	370,191
2006	428,616
2007	508,132
2008	491,702
2009	438,812
2010	548,889
2011	518,274
2012	745,303
2013	732,661
2014	648,930
2015	597,899
2016	537,474
2017	520,742

In 2017, Toyota reported the Hilux sold around 521,000 units in 190 countries, with production in 6 countries. 167,000 units were sold in Asia, 116,000 in South America, 65,000 in the Middle East, 55,000 in Africa, 51,000 in Oceania, 41,000 in Europe, 19,000 in North America, and around 1,000 in Japan. In the same year, 310,500 units were produced in Thailand, 103,000 produced in Argentina, 76,500 produced in South Africa, 18,200 produced in Malaysia, 6,500 produced in Pakistan, and 600 produced in Venezuela.

=== Sales ===
Year	Thailand	Australia	New Zealand	Indonesia	Philippines	Malaysia (Note: Figures based on registration (Malaysia))	South Africa	Brazil	Argentina	Mexico	Saudi Arabia
1990		14,572									
1991		12,935									
1992		14,697									
1993											
1994		19,285									
1995		17,586									
1996		17,354									
1997		16,701									
1998		20,820									
1999		22,093									
2000		21,509				3,647					
2001		17,635				3,052					
2002		22,515				3,255					
2003						6,819		5,606			
2004	100,328	28,077				7,303		6,711			
2005	177,627	31,369				9,435		13,845			
2006	166,358	36,885		300		11,404		17,385			
2007	158,348	42,009		3,055		11,019		19,342	17,062		
2008	127,028	42,956		6,980		12,500		21,731	18,544		
2009	102,026	38,457		4,746		14,574		30,994	18,203		
2010	144,190	39,896		7,687		18,514		33,656	18,244		
2011	121,887	36,124		8,301		21,480		33,260	20,704		
2012	233,293	40,646		12,556		28,566		38,889	23,117	5,499	
2013	206,939	39,931		14,129		27,155		42,627	27,237	9,120	
2014	144,693	38,126		9,206		25,715		43,310	27,635	8,783	
2015	120,112	35,161	5,623	10,757		27,158	35,684	32,684	27,515	10,504	
2016	120,444	42,104	6,187	4,996	12,405	18,477	35,428	34,031	31,964	13,644	
2017	109,988	47,093	8,106	7,661	14,688	17,927	36,422	34,378	33,914	19,132	
2018	150,928	51,705	8,086	9,126	18,237	19,734	40,022	39,313	33,439	18,943	
2019	165,452	47,759	7,126	8,369	20,846	15,796	40,934	40,408	25,087	17,654	24,046
2020	129,893	45,176	5,796	5,651	10,642	14,204	31,263	32,395	19,064	13,666	21,838
2021	127,669	52,801	8,430	7,737	18,969	18,150	36,085	45,897	27,072	16,635	16,993
2022	148,101	64,391	9,787	16,555	24,537	26,899	32,203	48,565	24,628	20,842	
2023	106,601	61,111	8,054	20,195	25,958	27,276	37,382	46,206	30,694	18,117	
2024	66,244	53,499	7,296	15,484 (Note: Including Hilux Rangga models)	26,643	26,738	32,656	50,011	28,988	21,370	
2025	62,585	51,947		16,678		28,118	36,525	49,732	30,714	19,661	

== Reputation ==
The Hilux has often been described as having a high level of durability and reliability during sustained heavy use or even abuse.

This reputation was highlighted in several episodes of the BBC motoring show Top Gear. In series 3, episodes 5 and 6, a 1988 diesel N50 Hilux with 305,775 km (190,000 miles) on the odometer was subjected to considerable abuse, including being left on a beach for the incoming tide, left on top of a building as it was demolished, and being set on fire. The Hilux suffered severe structural damage, but was still running after being repaired with only the typical tools that would be found in a truck's toolbox (with the exception of a replaced windscreen for the driver's safety). In later series, this Hilux became one of the background decorations in the Top Gear studio, and is now on display in the "World of Top Gear" exhibit at the National Motor Museum, Beaulieu. In the later series 8, episode 3, a Hilux was chosen by Jeremy Clarkson as his platform for creating an amphibious vehicle (though by the end of that episode the Hilux failed to start), and in the Top Gear: Polar Special Clarkson and James May raced a specially modified 2007 model Hilux to the magnetic north pole from North Canada – making that truck the first motor vehicle to have made that journey. The camera crew's vehicle from this episode was later modified and driven to near the summit of the Eyjafjallajökull erupting Icelandic volcano by James May, in Series 15, Episode 1.

In 1999, the Hilux appeared in a series of "Bugger" television advertisements in New Zealand and Australia, exaggerating its power and durability for comic effect. The adverts were banned in New Zealand after receiving 120 complaints, but later reinstated.

A world record was achieved by the support crew for the participants in the 2008/2009 Amundsen Omega 3 South Pole Race. The crew traveled in specially adapted Toyota Hiluxes modified by Arctic Trucks, completing a trip of over 5,000 km (3,100 miles) from Novo, a Russian Scientific Station in Antarctica to the Geographic South Pole and back again, making them the first 4×4s to reach the South Pole. The return journey of 2,500 km (1,600 miles) from the South Pole to Novo Station was completed in a record 8 days and 17 hours.

=== Racing ===
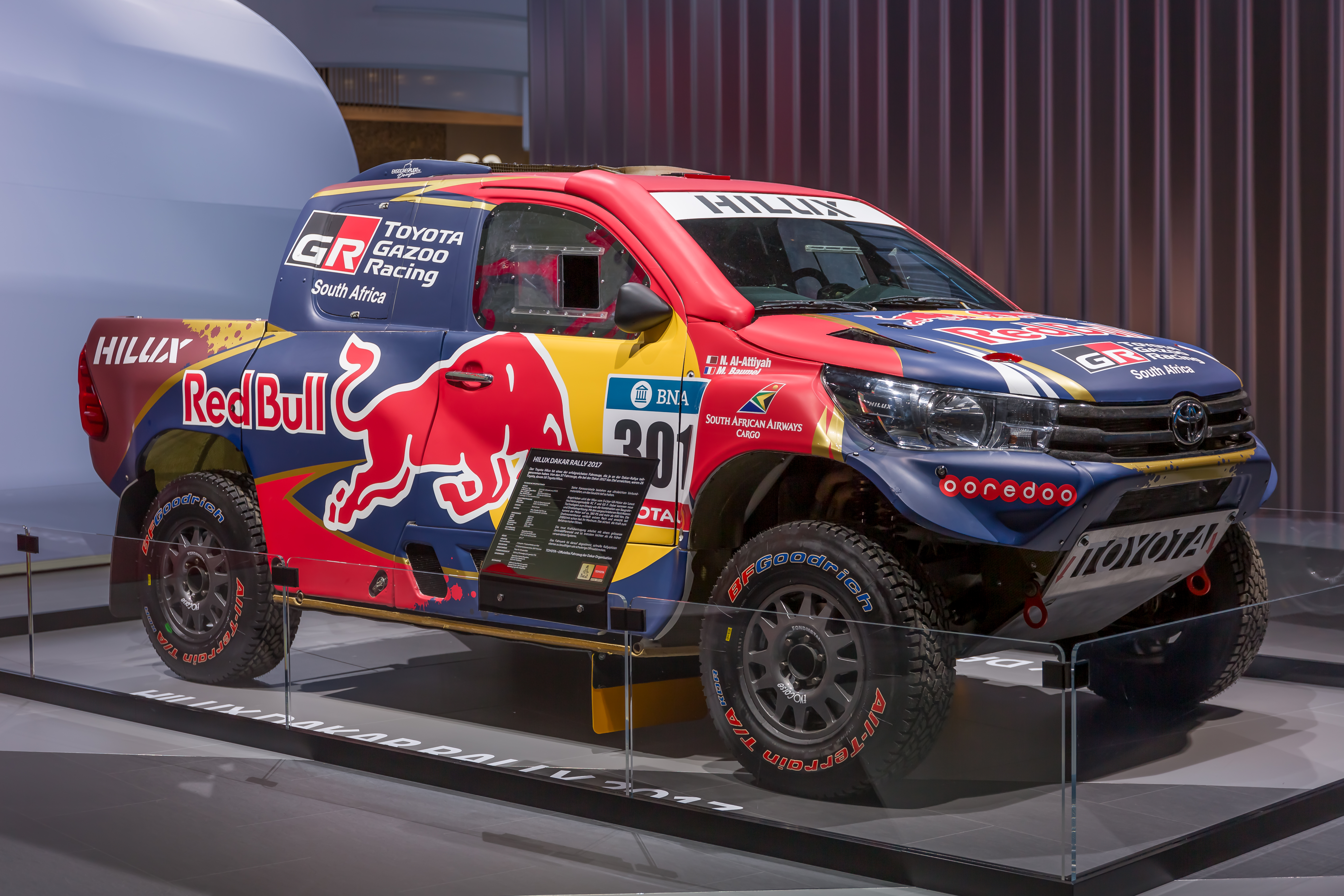
2017 Toyota Hilux Dakar car

Two Hilux pickups entered the Dakar Rally in 2012, prepared by the Imperial Toyota team of South Africa. Driver Giniel de Villiers achieved third place in the 2012, second place overall in the 2013, 4th in the 2014, and again second place in the 2015. These however, were heavily modified non-production versions built around a custom racing-only tubular chassis and using a larger capacity Toyota V8 engine. Since 2016, the Dakar Rally Hilux has been prepared by Toyota Gazoo Racing WRT. Giniel achieved third place with it in 2016, 5th in 2017, 3rd in 2018 and 9th in 2019. Nasser Al-Attiyah won the 2019 Dakar Rally, earning the first ever Toyota victory in the Dakar Rally, he also came in second in 2018 and 2021. In the 2020 Dakar Rally, six Hilux cars were entered prepared by Gazoo Racing, and another nine by Overdrive Racing. A new, wider, heavier, featuring larger wheels Toyota GR DKR Hilux T1+ was built by Gazoo Racing for 2022 Dakar Rally, equipped with 3.5-L twin-turbo V6 engine, based on Toyota Land Cruiser 300 GR Sport.

=== Non-Standard Tactical Vehicles ===
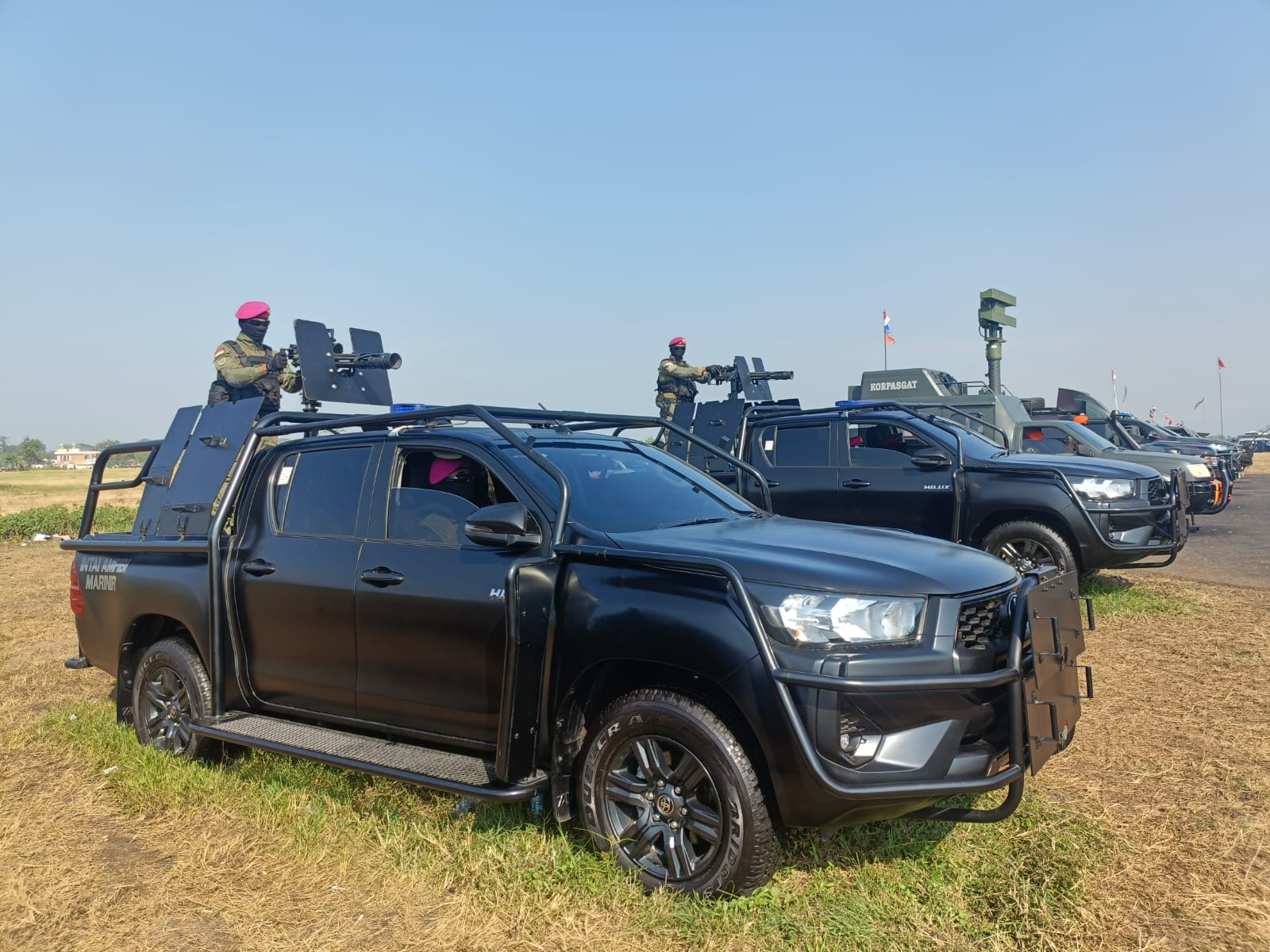
Two Hilux Facelift 2024 with M134P minigun installed, and add-on armour at front and side; used as special reconnaissance vehicle by the Indonesian Marine Reconnaissance Battalion.

While not standard issue, various countries including the US military, particularly Special Operations forces, have used Toyota Hilux vehicles for various purposes. They are often acquired as technical vehicle or Non-Standard Tactical Vehicles (NSTVs) and modified for specific missions. These vehicles are favoured for their reliability, ease of maintenance, and ability to operate in diverse environments.

=== Use by militant groups ===
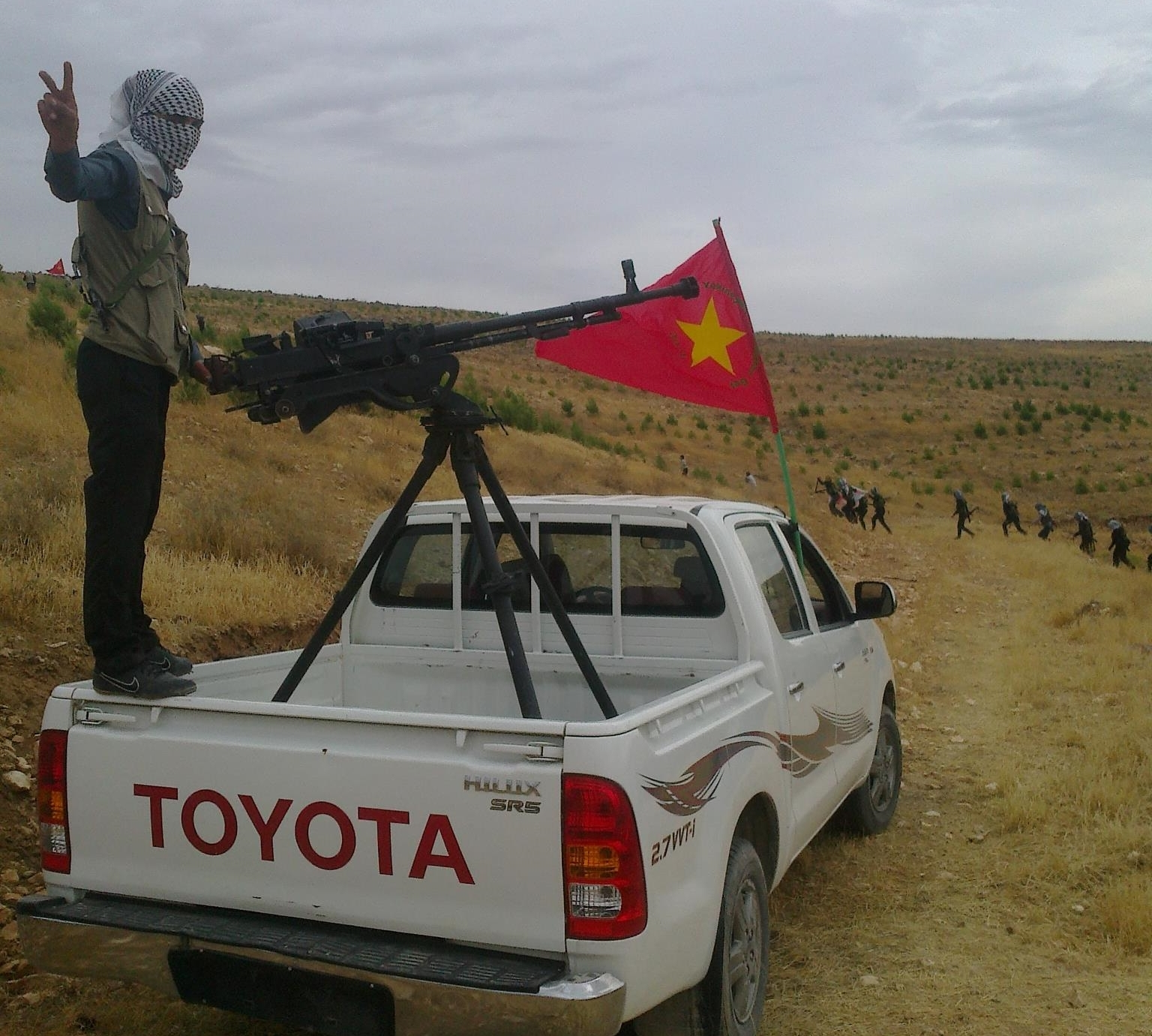
A Toyota Hilux with a DShKM machine gun used by the Kurdish YPG militia

Due to its durability and reliability, the Toyota Hilux, along with the larger Toyota Land Cruiser (J70), has become popular among paramilitary groups in war-torn regions as a technical. According to terrorism analyst Andrew Exum, the Hilux is "the vehicular equivalent of the AK-47. It's ubiquitous to insurgent warfare." In 2015, US counter-terror officials inquired with Toyota how the Salafi jihadist extremist group Islamic State had apparently acquired large numbers of Toyota Hiluxes and Land Cruisers. Mark Wallace, the CEO of the Counter Extremism Project said, "Regrettably, the Toyota Land Cruiser and Hilux have effectively become almost part of the ISIS brand."

The Toyota War between Libya and Chad in 1986 and 1987 was named as such because of the heavy, successful use of Hilux and Land Cruiser trucks for technicals.

== See also ==
- List of Toyota vehicles
