= Daihatsu Taft (F10) =

Daihatsu Taft (F10/F20/F50/F60)
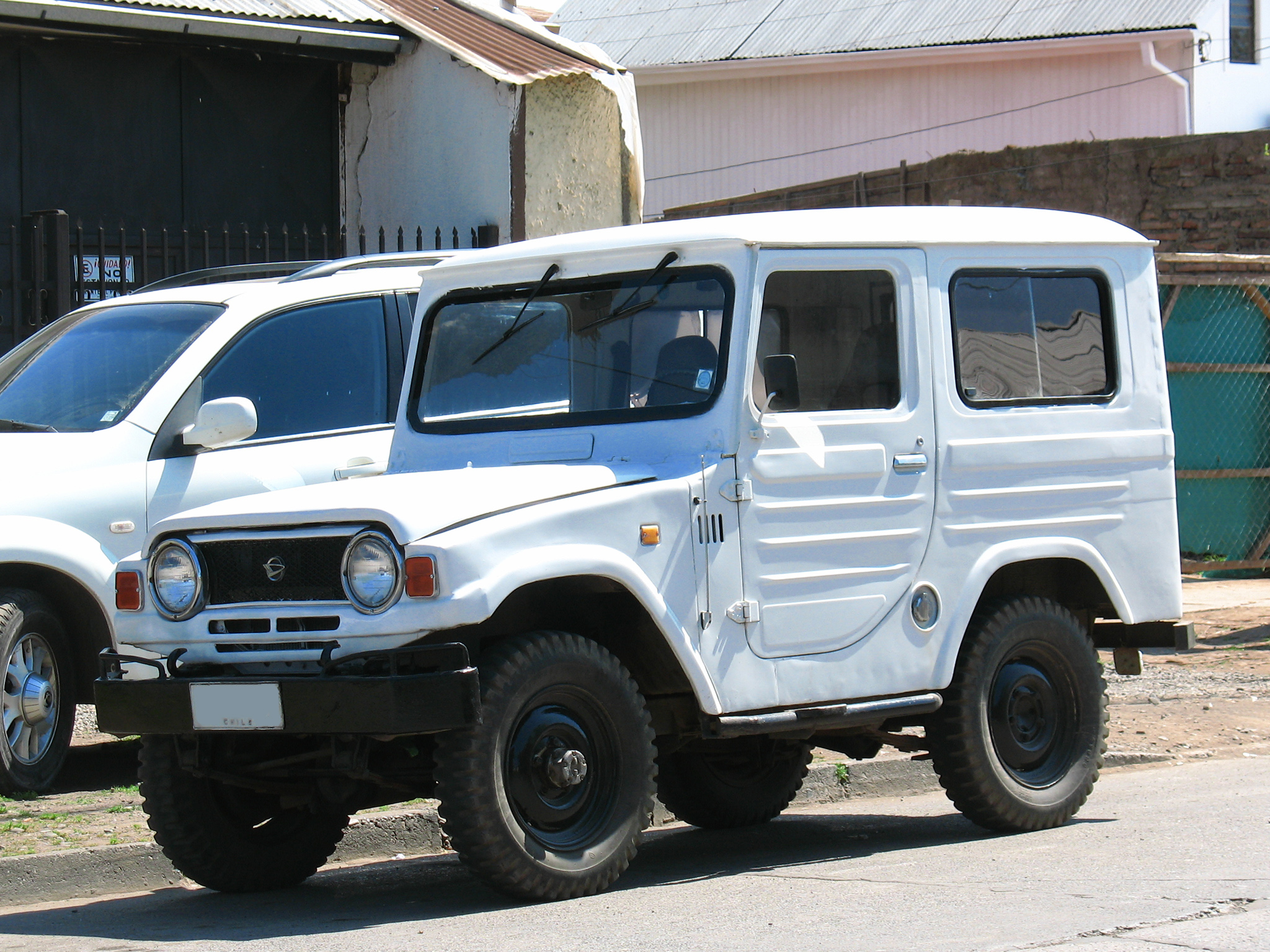
- 1980 Daihatsu Taft (F20)

Overview
- Manufacturer: Daihatsu
- Also called: Toyota Blizzard (LD10); Daihatsu Wildcat; Daihatsu Scat; Daihatsu Pionier (Austria)
- Production: August 1974 – April 1984

Body and chassis
- Class: Off-road vehicle; Mini SUV
- Layout: Front-engine, four-wheel-drive

Powertrain
- Engine: petrol: 1.0 L FE I4; 1.6 L 12R-J I4; diesel: 2.5 L DG I4; 2.8 L DL I4
- Transmission: 4-speed manual; 5-speed manual

Dimensions
- Wheelbase: 2,025 mm (79.7 in)
- Length: 3,320 mm (130.7 in); 3,485 mm (137.2 in) (long body)
- Width: 1,460 mm (57.5 in)
- Height: 1,860 mm (73.2 in)
- Curb weight: 985–1,255 kg (2,172–2,767 lb)

Chronology
- Successor: Daihatsu Rugger

The F10/F20/F50/F60 series Daihatsu Taft (Japanese: ダイハツ・タフト, Hepburn: Daihatsu Tafuto) is an off-road vehicle built by Daihatsu between 1974 and 1984. It was also sold as the Wildcat in Australia, and Scat in Germany and some other European markets. The Taft is similar to the Suzuki Jimny, although a bit larger. The name "Taft" stands for "'Tough and Almighty Four-wheel Touring Vehicle".

The first Taft was the F10 model, introduced in 1974. It was equipped with a 1.0 L (958 cc) petrol engine mated to a four-speed manual transmission with a two-range transfer case. The F10 model is available in short wheelbase (SWB) softtop and hardtop versions.

Around 1977, the F10 was replaced with the F20 series with a larger 1.6 L (1587 cc) Toyota 12R petrol engine. Around the same time the F50 with a 2.5 L DG diesel engine was introduced. Both models had an improved transmission and were available in SWB softtop and hardtop versions, either as four- or six-seaters. In 1979, trayback/ute versions of the F20 and F50 introduced as the F25 and F55 models. In Papua New Guinea, these models were sold with a locally manufactured dropside cargo tray from 1980.

Around 1983, updated F20/F25 models were introduced with an optional Deluxe version and optional five-speed transmission. At the same time the 2.5-litre F50/F55 models were replaced with the F60/F65 with a 2.8 L DL diesel engine, with the same Deluxe model version and optional five-speed gearbox. In Indonesia, the radiator grille material was changed from steel to plastic, along with plastic fender flares. The interior also had a redesigned centre dashboard which included 4 dial meters (clock, ampere meter, engine temperature meter, and fuel meter), optional air conditioning switch, and stereo head unit. The tachometer dial is placed side-by-side with the speedometer.

In Europe, Giovanni Michelotti marketed a luxuriously equipped version of the Taft, a version echoed by the later Bertone Freeclimbers.

Daihatsu revived the "Taft" nameplate in Japan in 2020 as a kei car competing with the Suzuki Hustler.

== Toyota Blizzard ==
Between 1981 and 1984, Toyota sold a rebadged Taft known as the Toyota Blizzard (Japanese: トヨタ・ブリザード, Hepburn: Toyota Burizādo). Fitted with a 2.2 L L-series diesel engine, the LD10 Blizzard had the same optional Deluxe model variant as the Taft.

In 1984, the Taft models were replaced with the F70 series Rugger (also called "Fourtrak" in the United Kingdom, "Rocky" in Australia and most European markets). In Indonesia, the succeeding Rugger/Rocky/Fourtrak still used the "Taft" name among many others.

== Gallery ==
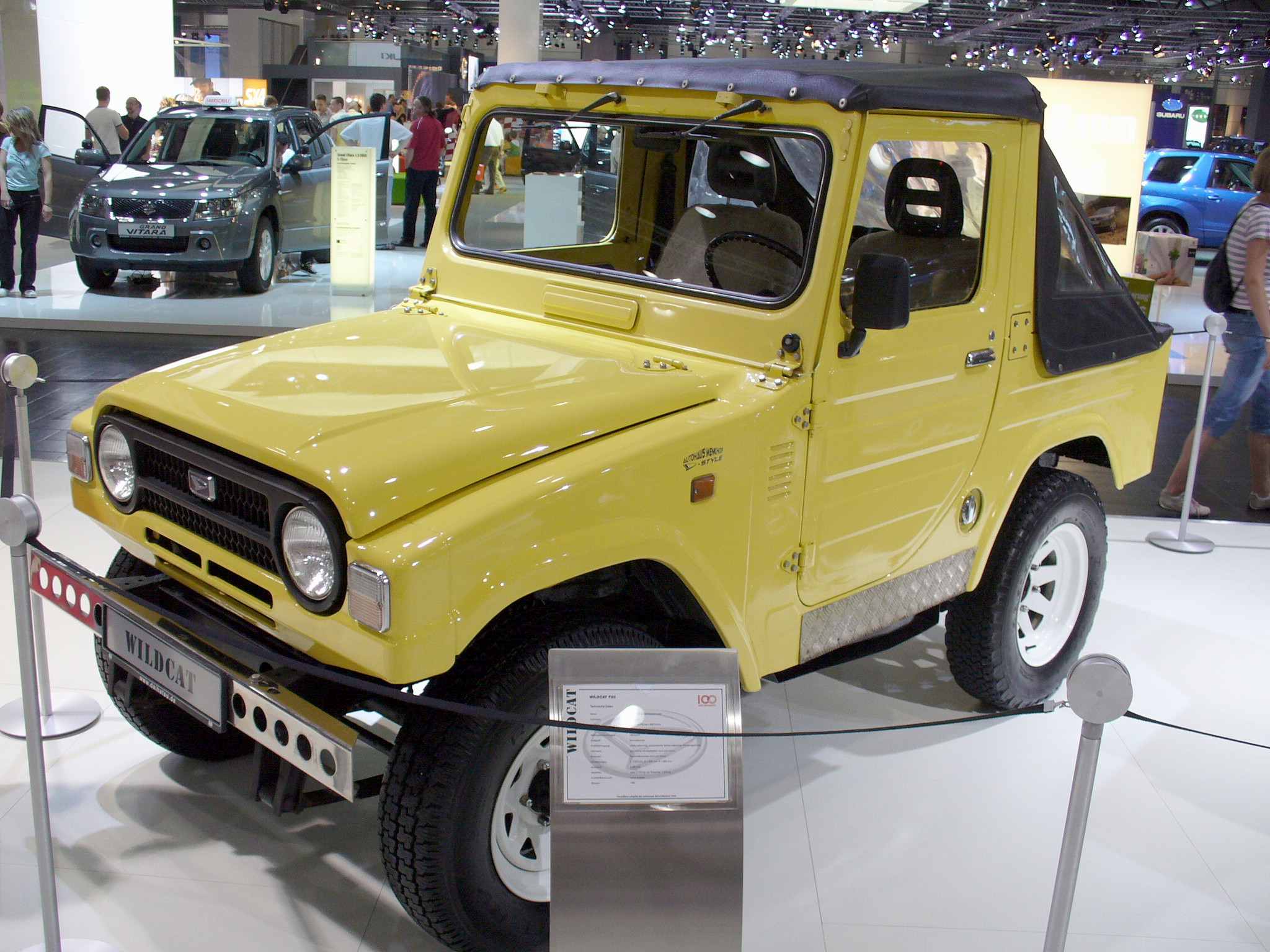
Daihatsu Wildcat

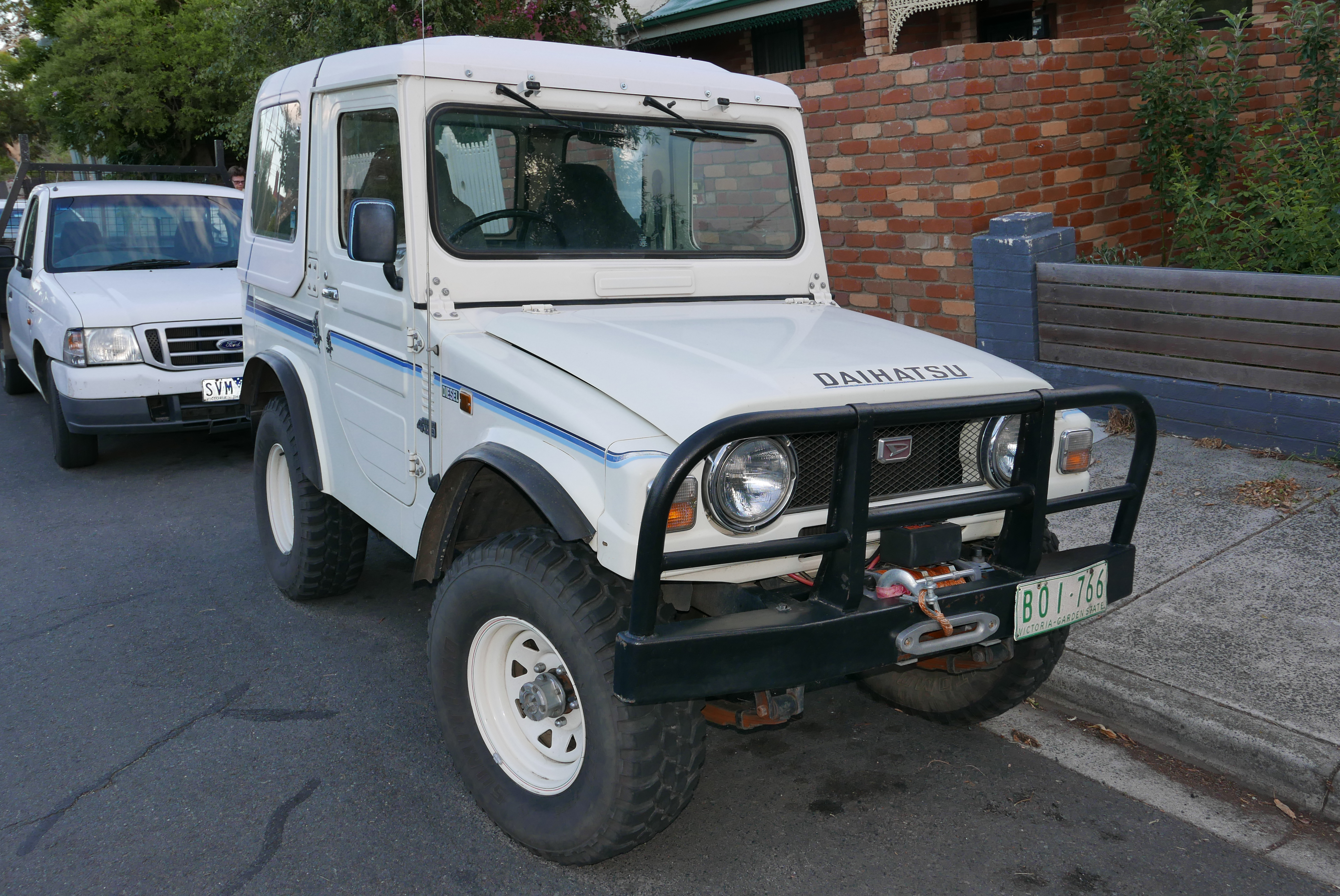
Daihatsu Scat

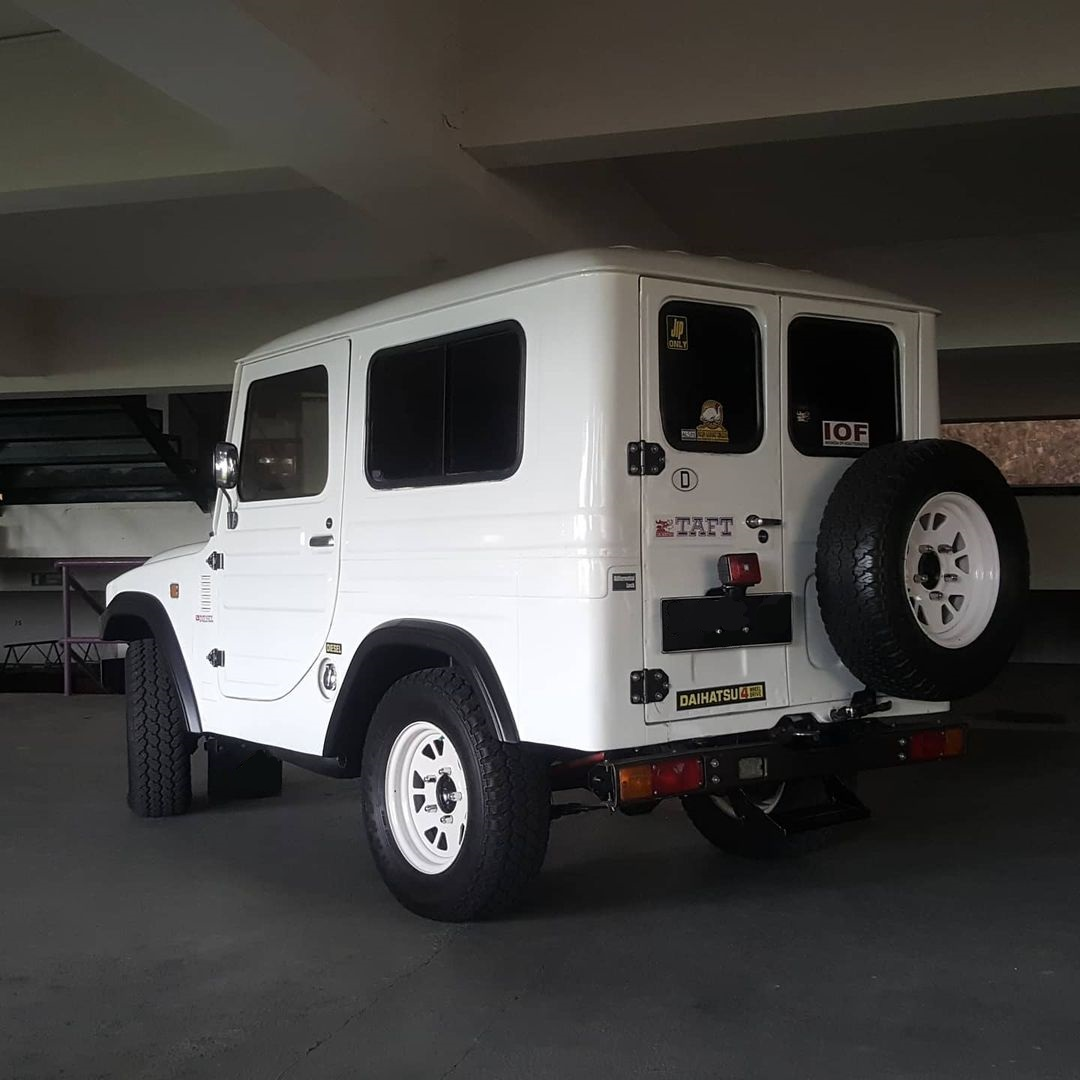
1983 Daihatsu Taft (F50)
