= Toyota Blizzard =

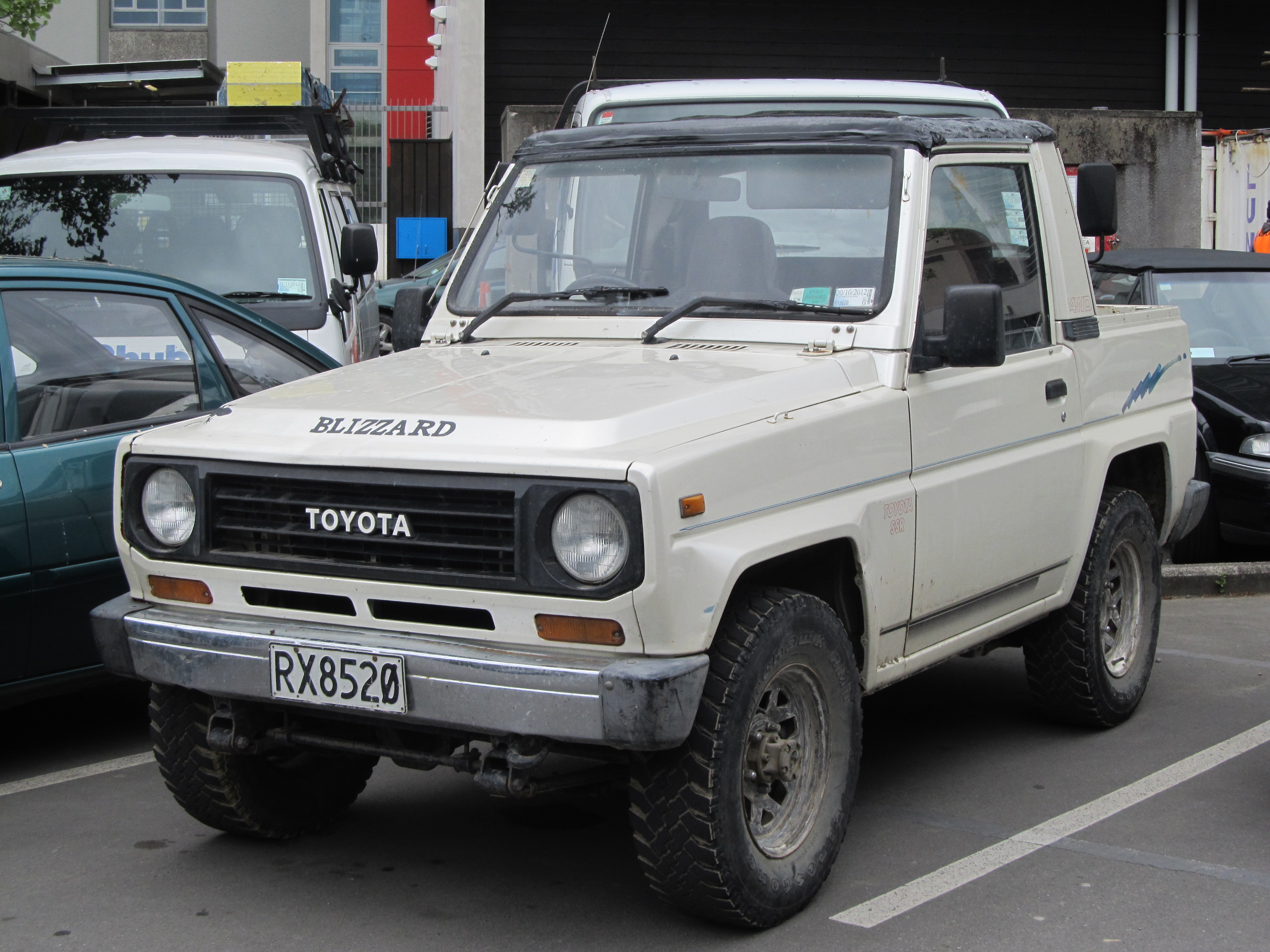
- 1985 Toyota Blizzard soft-top (LD20)

Overview
- Manufacturer: Daihatsu
- Production: 1980–1990

Body and chassis
- Class: Off-road vehicle
- Related: Daihatsu Taft & Daihatsu Rugger

The Toyota Blizzard is a four-wheel-drive vehicle built by Daihatsu for Toyota from March 1980 to 1990. The first generation LD10 was a version of the Daihatsu Taft and the second generation LD20 was based on the Daihatsu Rugger. The Blizzard was exclusive to Toyota Vista Store locations.

== Blizzard (LD10) ==
Toyota Blizzard (LD10)
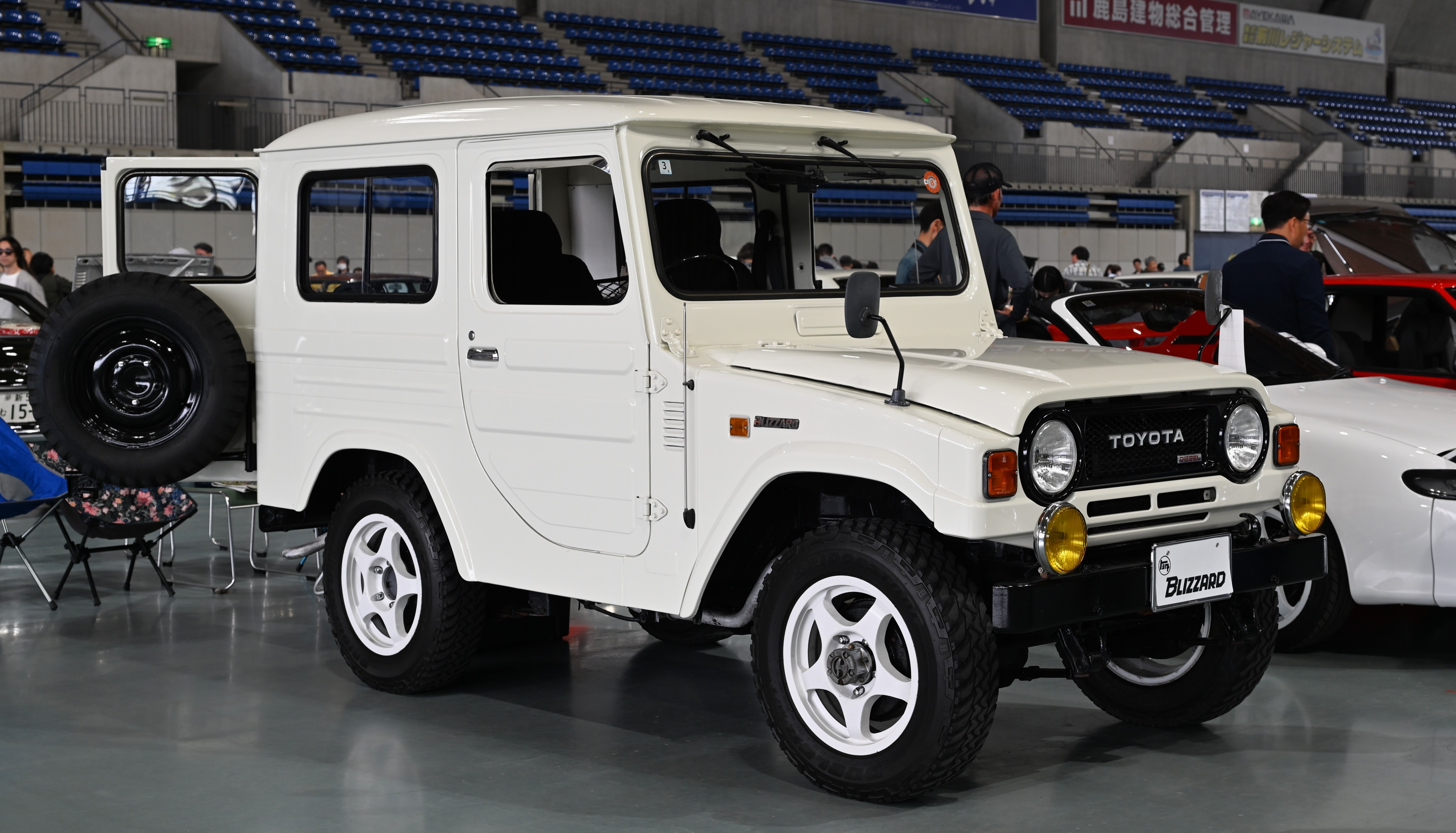

Overview
- Production: 1980–1984

Body and chassis
- Layout: Four-wheel-drive
- Related: Daihatsu Taft

Powertrain
- Engine: 2.2 L 4-cylinder diesel

Dimensions
- Wheelbase: 2,025 mm (79.7 in)
- Length: 3,485 mm (137.2 in)
- Width: 1,460 mm (57.5 in)
- Height: 1,860 mm (73.2 in)
- Kerb weight: 1,210–1,245 kg (2,668–2,745 lb)

The LD10 Blizzard was launched in 1980 and is based on the Daihatsu Taft (also known as the Scat), and was replaced in 1984 with the LD20, based on the Daihatsu Rugger. The Blizzard was only intended for the Japanese domestic market.

The Blizzard LD10 equipped with the naturally aspirated 2.2 (2188 cc) L diesel engine. The engines were originally coupled to a Toyota 4-speed manual transmission, while 1983+ models came with a 5-speed.

It is a rare Toyota vehicle with less than a dozen known examples in North America. Visually very similar to the Daihatsu vehicles, they were rebadged by Toyota and utilize Toyota engines.

== Blizzard (LD20) ==
Toyota Blizzard (LD20)
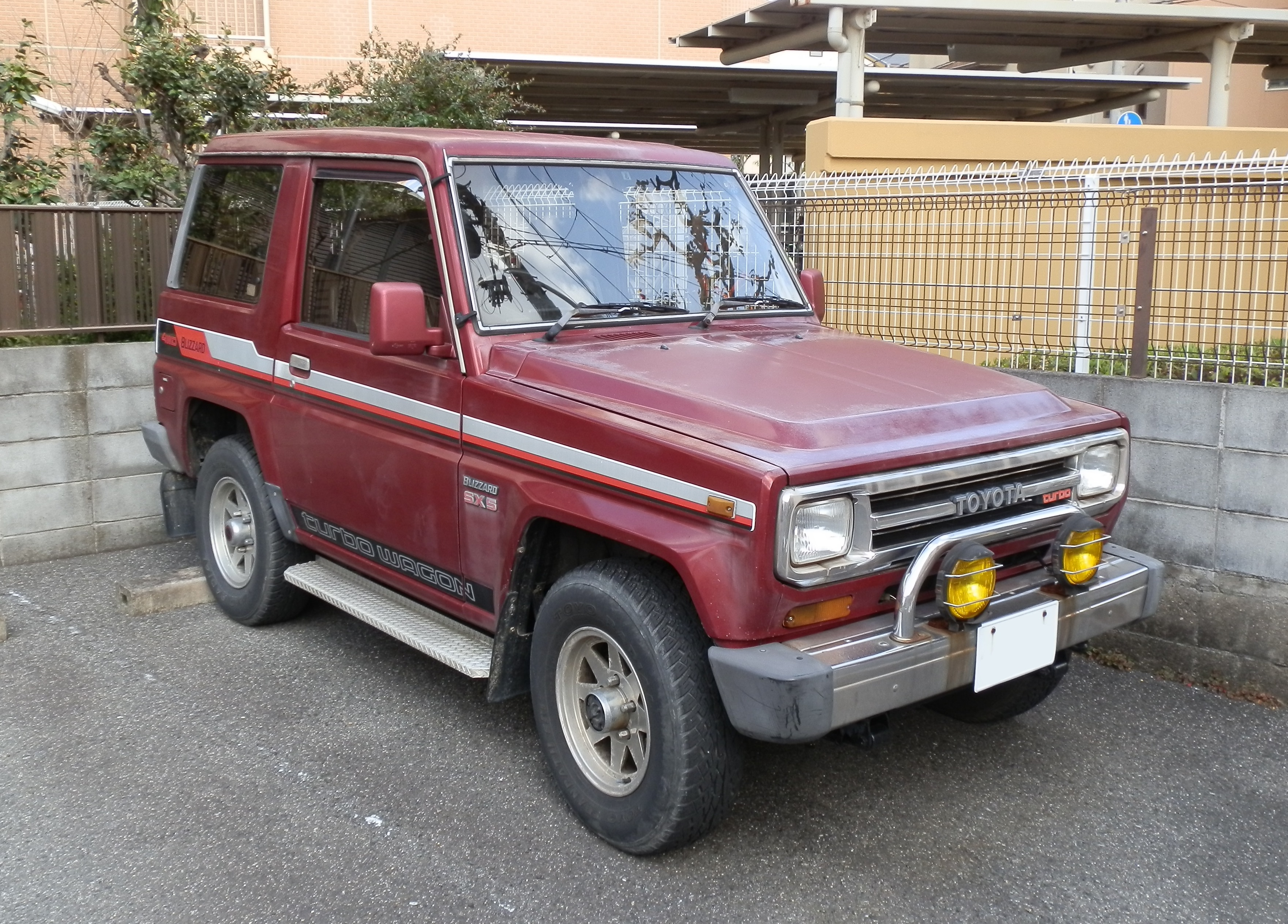
- 1987 Toyota Blizzard SX-5 (Facelift)

Overview
- Production: 1984–1990

Body and chassis
- Layout: Four-wheel-drive
- Related: Daihatsu Rugger

Powertrain
- Engine: 2.4 L 4-cylinder diesel

Dimensions
- Wheelbase: 2,205 mm (86.8 in)
- Length: 3,655 mm (143.9 in)
- Width: 1,580 mm (62.2 in)
- Height: 1,840 mm (72.4 in)
- Kerb weight: 1,350–1,400 kg (2,976–3,086 lb)

The LD20 Blizzard is based on the Daihatsu Rugger and is equipped with the 2.4-litre (2446 cc) 2L diesel engine producing 83 PS, and from 1985 it was fitted with the 96 PS 2L-T turbodiesel. The Blizzard has part-time four-wheel-drive with a 5-speed manual transmission with a 2-speed transfer case.

The LD20 underwent a minor facelift in 1987 and can be identified by the change from round to rectangular headlamps and larger bumpers.
