= Toyota L engine =

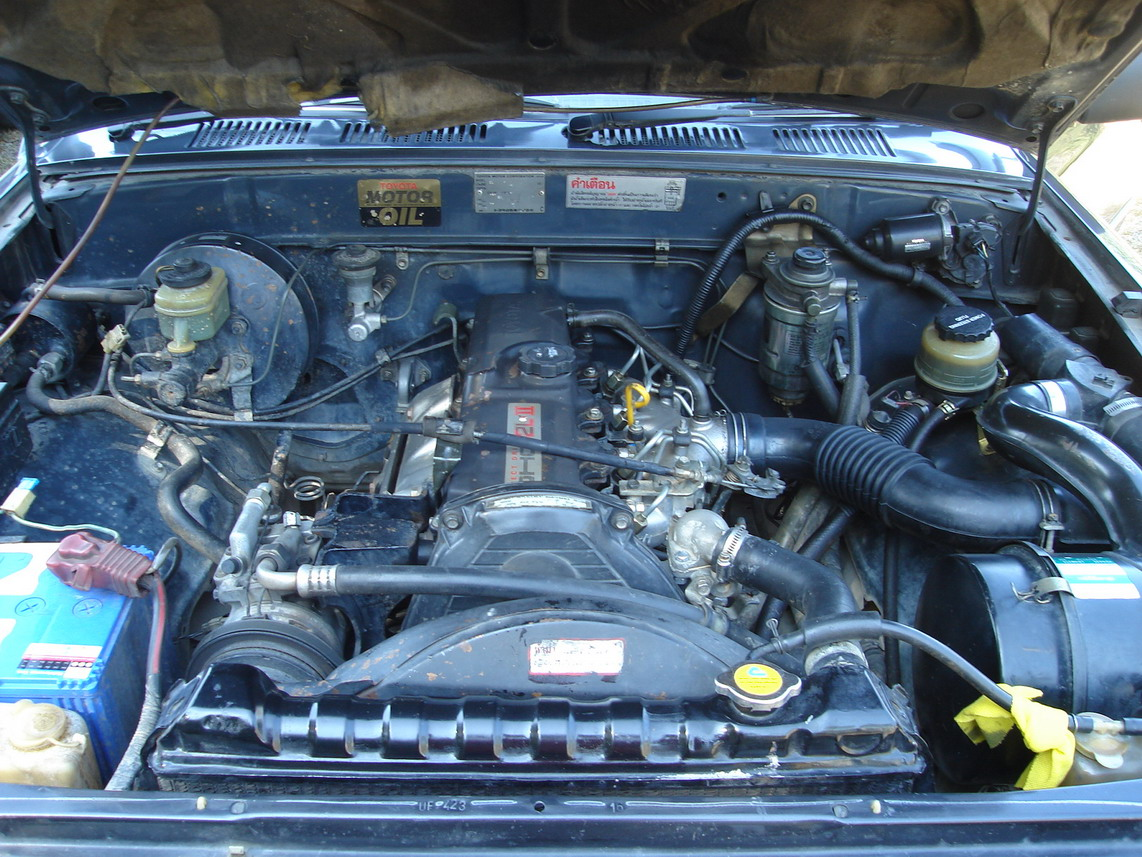

Overview
- Manufacturer: Toyota Motor Corporation
- Production: 1977–present

Layout
- Configuration: Inline 4
- Displacement: 2.2–3.0 L (2,188–2,985 cc)
- Valvetrain: SOHC 2 valves x cyl.

Combustion
- Fuel system: Indirect injection, Electronic fuel injection (2L-TE, 2L-THE, 5L-E)
- Fuel type: Diesel
- Cooling system: Water-cooled

Output
- Power output: 72–99 hp (54–74 kW; 73–100 PS)
- Torque output: 12.9–24.5 kg⋅m (127–240 N⋅m; 93–177 lb⋅ft)

Chronology
- Successor: Toyota KZ engine Toyota KD engine

The L family is a family of inline four-cylinder diesel engines manufactured by Toyota, which first appeared in October 1977. It is the first diesel engine from Toyota to use a rubber timing belt in conjunction with a SOHC head. Some engines like the 2L-II and the 2L-T are still in production to the present day. As of August 2020, the 5L-E engine is still used in Gibraltar in the fifth-generation Toyota HiAce, eighth-generation Toyota Hilux, second-generation Toyota Fortuner, and fourth-generation Toyota Land Cruiser Prado. Vehicles with the diesel engine were exclusive to Toyota Japan dealership locations called Toyota Diesel Store until that sales channel was disbanded in 1988.

== L ==
The L is the first L engine produced. Toyota solely refers to it as the L engine, not the 1L engine. 2.2 L (2,188 cc), four-cylinder diesel engine. Bore and stroke are 90 mm × 86 mm (3.54 in × 3.39 in), with compression ratios of around 21.5:1

Applications:

72 PS (53 kW; 71 hp) at 4200 rpm, 14.5 kg⋅m (142 N⋅m; 105 lb⋅ft) at 2400 rpm (Gross JIS)

- 6th generation Crown Sedan/Hardtop/Wagon/Van (LS110) with manual transmission
- 2nd generation HiAce Truck/Van/Wagon (LH11/20/24/30) and 1st generation Hiace Quick Delivery (LH24HV)
- 4th generation Toyoace (LY20/30)
- 3rd generation Hiace Van/Wagon (LH50/60/70)
- 3rd generation Hilux (LN40)
- 4th generation Hilux (LN55)
- 1st generation Blizzard (LD10)
- 1979−1980 Mark II (LX40)
- 1980−1984 Mark II Sedan/Cressida/Chaser/Cresta (LX60/LX67V)

== 2L ==
The 2L is a 2.4 L (2,446 cc) 4-cylinder diesel engine. Bore and stroke are 92 mm × 92 mm (3.62 in × 3.62 in), with compression ratios of around 22.3:1 and a redline of 4800 rpm. Outputs range from 76 to 87 PS (56 to 64 kW; 75 to 86 hp) and torque of 15.8–16.8 kg⋅m (155–165 N⋅m; 114–122 lb⋅ft).

Applications:

83 PS (61 kW; 82 hp) at 4200 rpm, 17 kg⋅m (167 N⋅m; 123 lb⋅ft) at 2400 rpm (JIS Gross)

- 7th generation Crown Sedan/Crown Van (LS120/126V) with Manual transmission
- 3rd generation Hiace (LH51/51G/51V/56/61/66/71/76)
- 4th generation Hilux (LN56) and 1st Generation Hilux Surf/4Runner (LN60/65)
- 1985-1988 5th generation Toyoace/Dyna 100/Dyna 150 (LY50/60), 3rd Generation Hiace Truck (LH80/85/90/95), and 2nd generation Hiace Quick Delivery (LH80VH/85)

76 PS (56 kW; 75 hp) at 4000 rpm, 15.7 kg⋅m (154 N⋅m; 114 lb⋅ft) at 2400 rpm (Net)

- 1984−1990 2nd Generation Blizzard (LD20)

76 PS (56 kW; 75 hp) at 4000 rpm, 15.7 kg⋅m (154 N⋅m; 114 lb⋅ft) at 2400 rpm (Net JIS)

- 8th generation Crown Sedan (LS136V)

73 PS (54 kW; 72 hp) at 4000 rpm, 15.2 kg⋅m (149 N⋅m; 110 lb⋅ft) at 2400 rpm (Net JIS)

- 8th generation Crown Sedan (LS130)

85 PS (63 kW; 84 hp) at 4200 rpm, 16.8 kg⋅m (165 N⋅m; 122 lb⋅ft) at 2400 rpm (Gross JIS)

- Mark II/Chaser/Cresta/Cressida (LX70)

=== 2L-II ===
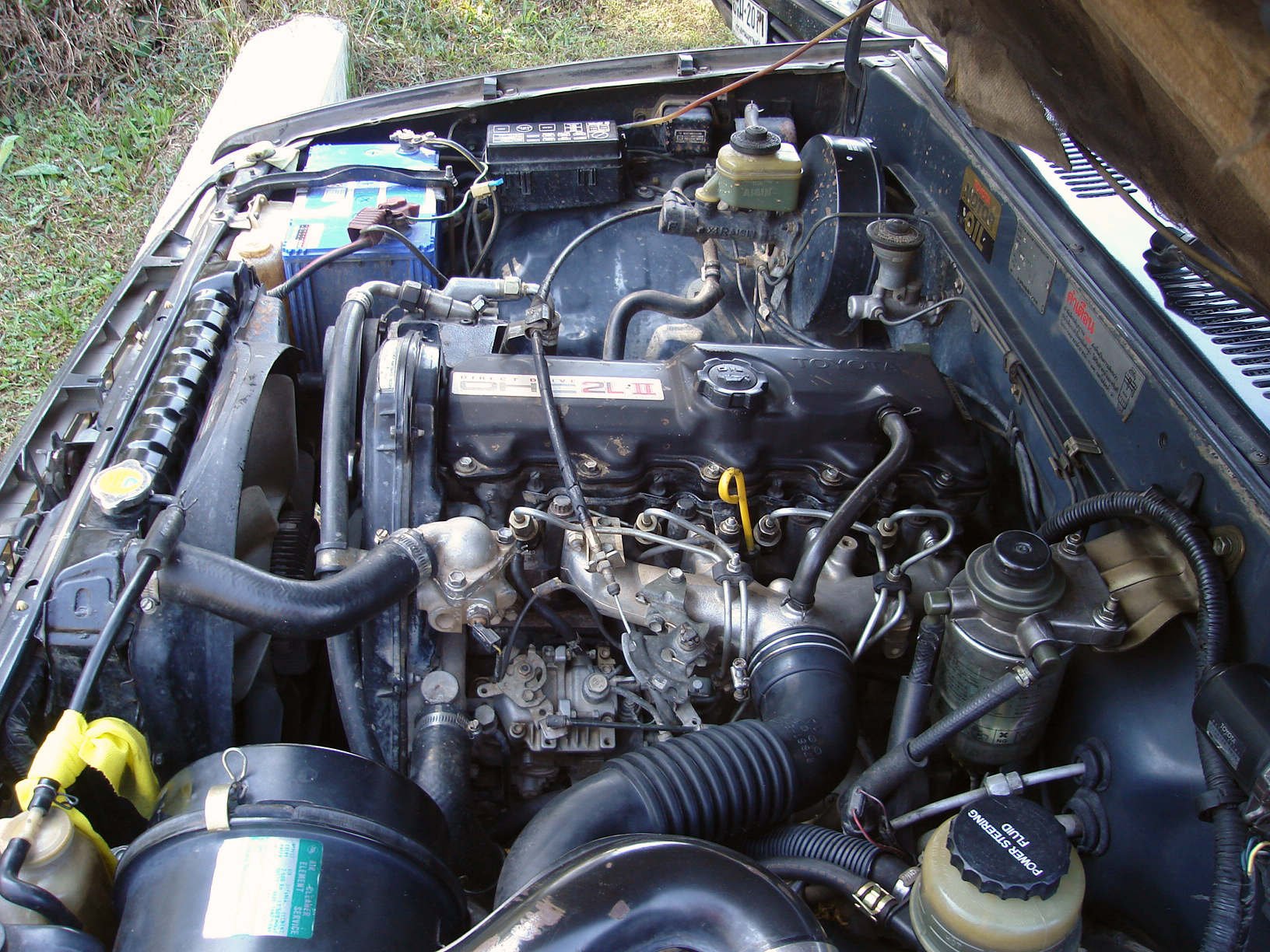
2L-II engine in Toyota Hilux

The 2L-II is an upgrade of the 2L introduced simultaneously with the 3L engine in 1988 in the 5th generation Hilux. Although bore and stroke remain the same, multiple changes have been made in its design. The engine block was made more rigid through the use of finite element analysis and through adding reinforcement ribbing. The most significant change is the redesigned cylinder head, where the camshaft now lifts the valve directly via tappet instead of using a rocker arm. The exhaust valve is 1mm larger in diameter and the inlet manifold is made 10mm larger in diameter. The pistons with a 5mm shorter compression height and piston rings were placed closer to the combustion chamber to reduce wasted volumetric capacity while durability was improved by the adoption of fiber reinforced piston grooves from the 1st Generation 2LTE to improve piston ring seizure resistance, groove wear resistance, thermal conductivity and thermal fatigue resistance over the previous Ni-Resist cast iron insert used previously to address ring seizure issues and wear resistance in bare aluminum pistons while the oil squirters were relocated to spray underneath the hottest part of the piston to further aid cooling. The revised pistons were 100g lighter than the ones in the 1st Generation 2L and the compression ratio changed to 22.2. The valve clearance is adjusted using shims. Later L engines (3L and 5L) also use this method of valve operation.

Applications:

- Crown Comfort (LXS10)
- 9th generation Crown Sedan (LS130)

85 PS (63 kW; 84 hp) at 4200 rpm, 16.8 kg⋅m (165 N⋅m; 122 lb⋅ft) at 2400 rpm (Net JIS)

- Mark II/Chaser/Cresta (LX80)
- 1988−onwards 5th generation Toyoace/Dyna 100 (LY50/60)

85 PS (63 kW; 84 hp) at 4200 rpm, 16.8 kg⋅m (165 N⋅m; 122 lb⋅ft) at 2400 rpm (Net JIS)

84 PS (62 kW; 83 hp) at 4200 rpm, 16.5 kg⋅m (162 N⋅m; 119 lb⋅ft) at 2400 rpm (Thailand, EEC)

82 PS (60 kW; 81 hp) at 4200 rpm, 16.7 kg⋅m (164 N⋅m; 121 lb⋅ft) at 2400 rpm (UK) 1989-1995

79 PS (58 kW; 78 hp) at 4200 rpm, 16.6 kg⋅m (163 N⋅m; 120 lb⋅ft) at 2200 rpm (UK) 1995 onwards

- 5th generation Hilux

83 PS (61 kW; 82 hp) at 4200 rpm, 16.5 kg⋅m (162 N⋅m; 119 lb⋅ft) at 2400 rpm (South Africa, SABS)

84 PS (62 kW; 83 hp) at 4200 rpm, 16.5 kg⋅m (162 N⋅m; 119 lb⋅ft) at 2400 rpm (Philippines)

78 PS (57 kW; 77 hp) at 4000 rpm, 16.0 kg⋅m (157 N⋅m; 116 lb⋅ft) at 2400 rpm (Thailand, EEC Net) 85 PS (63 kW; 84 hp) Gross

79 PS (58 kW; 78 hp) at 4000 rpm, 16.6 kg⋅m (163 N⋅m; 120 lb⋅ft) at 2200 rpm (UK) 1997-2000

75 PS (55 kW; 74 hp) at 4000 rpm, 15.9 kg⋅m (156 N⋅m; 115 lb⋅ft) at 2200 rpm (UK) 2000 onwards

- 6th Generation Hilux

79 PS (58 kW; 78 hp) at 4000 rpm, 16.6 kg⋅m (163 N⋅m; 120 lb⋅ft) at 2200-2800 rpm (UK, ECE) 1996-2000

75 PS (55 kW; 74 hp) at 4000 rpm, 15.9 kg⋅m (156 N⋅m; 115 lb⋅ft) at 2200 rpm (UK)2000 onwards

- 4th generation Hiace Powervan/Hiace SBV (LXH10/LXH20)

85 PS (63 kW; 84 hp) at 4200 rpm, 16.8 kg⋅m (165 N⋅m; 122 lb⋅ft) at 2400 rpm (Net JIS)

77.5 PS (57 kW; 76 hp) at 3900 rpm, 16.5 kg⋅m (162 N⋅m; 119 lb⋅ft) at 2400 rpm (UK)

- 4th generation Hiace (LH100/100G/102/104/108/110/112/114/118/140G)

75 PS (55 kW; 74 hp) at 4200 rpm, 15.4 kg⋅m (151 N⋅m; 111 lb⋅ft) at 2400 rpm (Indian Market)

- 3rd generation Kijang (Venture/Stallion/Qualis - LF50)

78 PS (57 kW; 77 hp) at 4200 rpm, 15.9 kg⋅m (156 N⋅m; 115 lb⋅ft) at 2400 rpm (Malaysia)

83 PS (61 kW; 82 hp) at 4200 rpm, 16.3 kg⋅m (160 N⋅m; 118 lb⋅ft) at 2400 rpm (Indonesia)

- 4th generation Kijang (Kijang/Tamaraw FX Revo/Unser - LF60/70/72/80/82)

87 PS (64 kW; 86 hp) at 4200 rpm, 16.8 kg⋅m (165 N⋅m; 122 lb⋅ft) at 2500 rpm (Philippines)

=== 2L-T ===
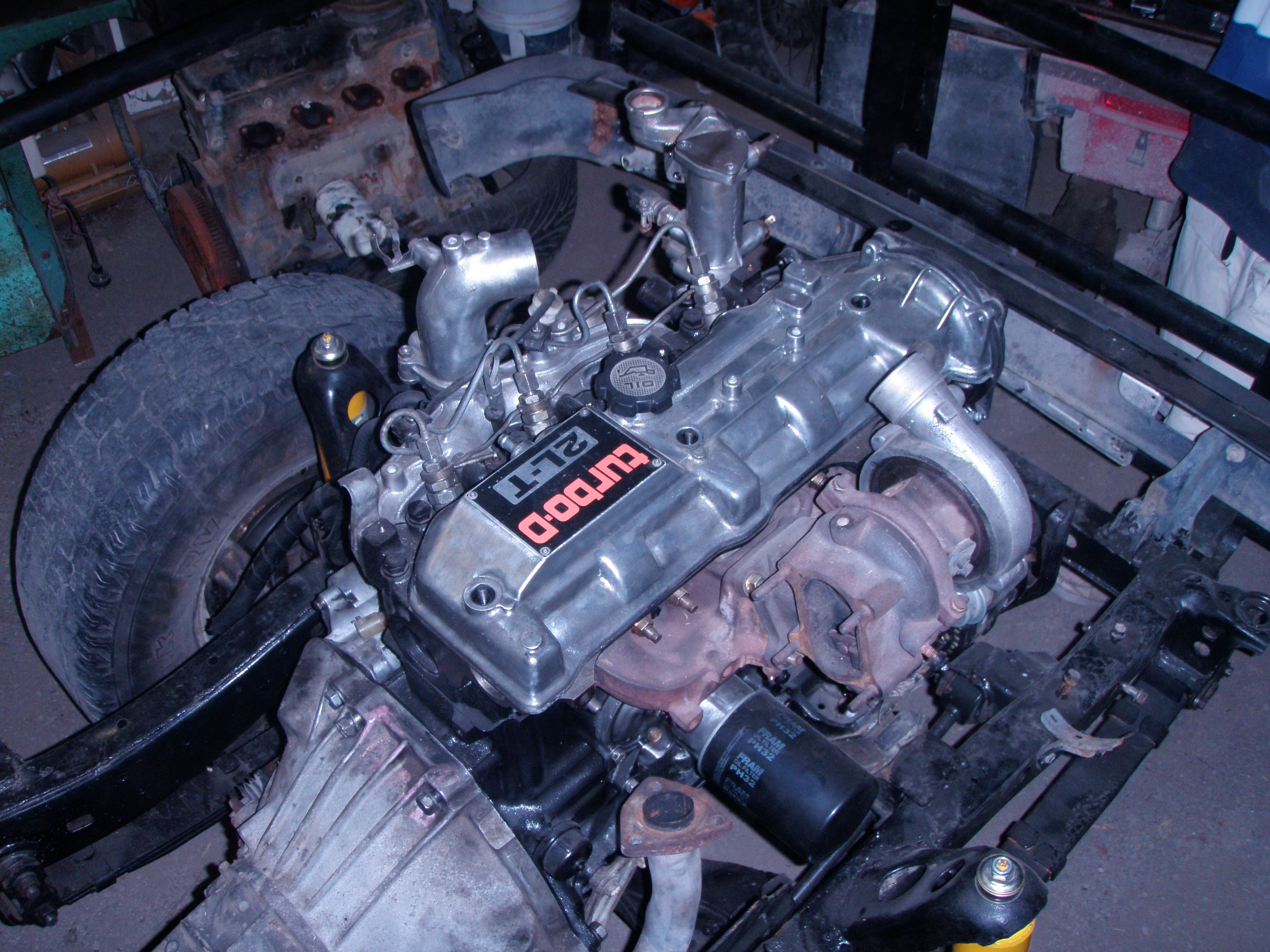
Early 2L-T

The 2L-T is a 2.4 L (2,446 cc) turbo version of the 2L still being produced since 1982. The bore and stroke are the same but the 2L-T has a compression ratio of 20:1. Output is 85 to 91 PS (63 to 67 kW; 84 to 90 hp) gross at 4000 rpm with 19.2 kg⋅m (188 N⋅m; 139 lb⋅ft) gross of torque at 2200 rpm. A dual mass flywheel was introduced in 1985 and pilot fuel injection in 1988.

Applications:

85 PS (63 kW; 84 hp) at 4000 rpm, 19.2 kg⋅m (188 N⋅m; 139 lb⋅ft) at 2400 rpm (Net JIS)

- 1st generation Hilux Surf/4Runner
- Land Cruiser (70 Series) Light Duty/Bundera
- 8th generation Crown Sedan/Crown Hardtop (LS130) with manual transmission
- 1999-2006, ARO 24 Series

85 PS (63 kW; 84 hp) at 4000 rpm, 19.2 kg⋅m (188 N⋅m; 139 lb⋅ft) at 2400 rpm

96 PS (71 kW; 95 hp) at 4000 rpm, 19.5 kg⋅m (191 N⋅m; 141 lb⋅ft) at 2400 rpm (Gross JIS)

- 1985−1990 2nd Generation Blizzard (LD20)

96 PS (71 kW; 95 hp) at 4000 rpm, 19.5 kg⋅m (191 N⋅m; 141 lb⋅ft) at 2400 rpm (Gross JIS)

- 1982−1983, 6th generation Crown Hardtop/Crown Sedan (LS111) with manual transmission
- 1983−1984, 7th generation Crown Hardtop/Crown Sedan/Crown Wagon (LS120/120G) with manual transmission
- 3rd generation Hiace (LH51G)
- Mark II Sedan/Chaser Sedan (LX60)
- Mark II Sedan/Chaser Sedan/Cresta (LX70)

94 PS (69 kW; 93 hp) at 4000 rpm, 216 N⋅m (159 lb⋅ft) at 2,400 rpm (USA)

- 1984-1985 Toyota Pickup

=== 2L-T(II) ===
The 2L-T(II) is an upgrade of the 2L-T. Of the same dimensions as all other 2L engines, the most significant change is that the camshaft lifts the valve directly via tappet instead of a rocker arm. The valve clearance is adjusted using shims. Compression rate varies with fitment. Output is 94 PS (69 kW; 93 hp) at 4000 rpm, 22 kg⋅m (216 N⋅m; 159 lb⋅ft) at 2400 rpm.

Applications:

Compression Ratio 20.0:1 91 PS (67 kW; 90 hp) at 3500 rpm, 23.1 kg⋅m (227 N⋅m; 167 lb⋅ft) at 2200 rpm (UK)1997-2000

- 6th Generation Hilux

Compression Ratio 21.0:1

94 PS (69 kW; 93 hp) at 4000 rpm, 22.0 kg⋅m (216 N⋅m; 159 lb⋅ft) at 2400 rpm (Net JIS)

- 1989-1990, 4th generation Hiace (LH100G)
- 2nd generation Hilux Surf (LN130G)
- Mark II/Chaser/Cresta (LX80)

90 PS (66 kW; 89 hp) at 4000rpm, 22.3 kg⋅m (219 N⋅m; 161 lb⋅ft) at 2200rpm (UK)2000 onwards

- 6th Generation Hilux

Compression Ratio 22.2:1 90 PS (66 kW; 89 hp) at 3500rpm, 22.2 kg⋅m (218 N⋅m; 161 lb⋅ft) at 2250rpm (UK, DIN)

- 2000–2006 Metrocab TTT

=== 2L-TE ===
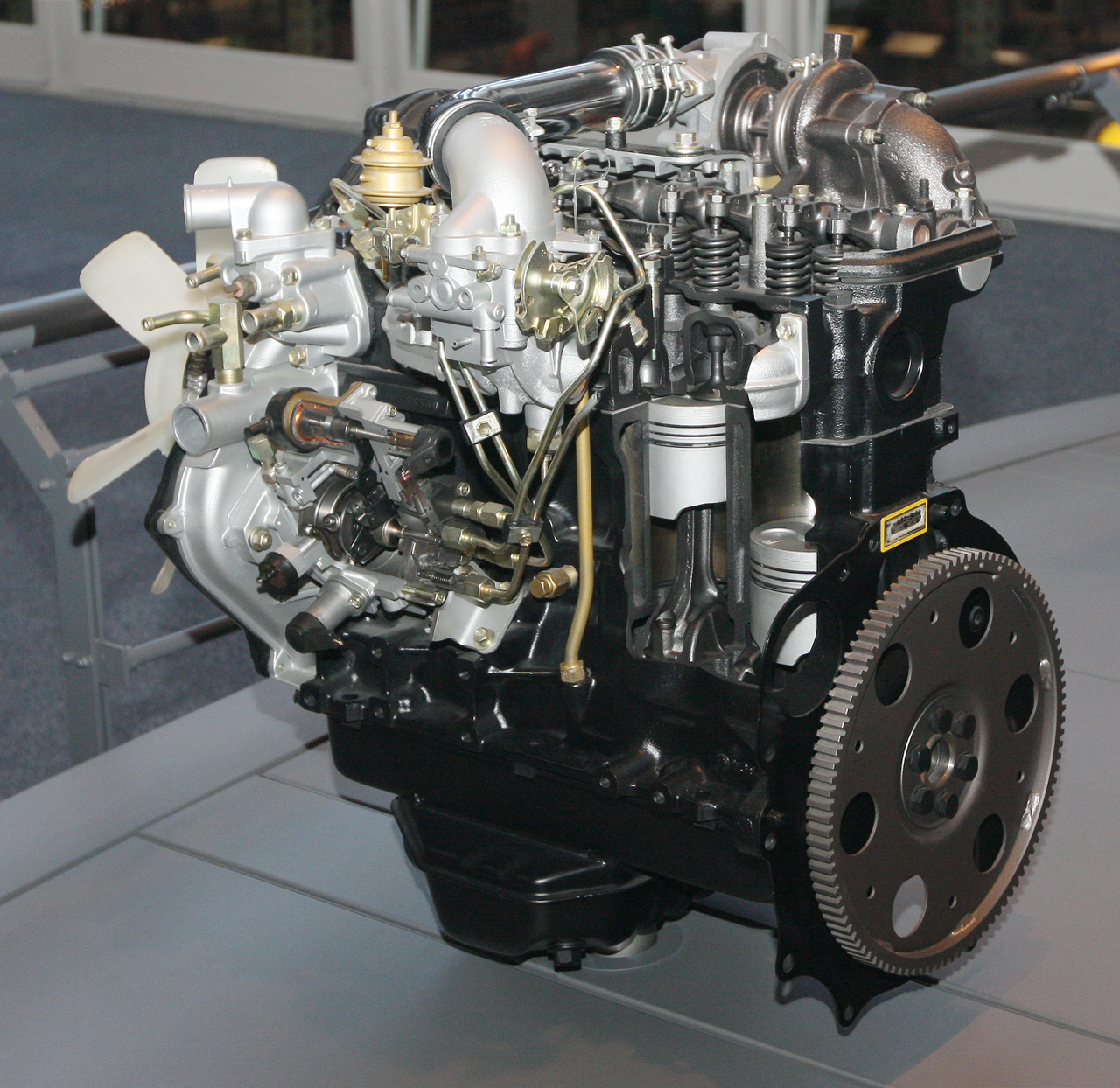
Toyota 2L-TE engine from 1982

Developed as a new version of 2L-T in 1982, the 2L-TE featured a new development used in diesel engines at that time, an electronically controlled injection pump. Although electronic fuel injection systems had long been used in gasoline engines, this is among the first diesel engine to adopt such a system. The electronic system (called "EFI" by Toyota) meters fuel with great precision and increased the engine's efficiency. It works through a combination of multiple sensors similar to those in a gasoline engine, but rather than actuating a fuel injector it actuates an SPV (Spill Control Valve) which is located on the head of the injection pump. To improve durability a new piston design using alumina-silica ceramic fiber reinforced piston ring grooves was used in place of the usual cast iron insert. This makes it one of the earliest applications of metal matrix composites. Like the 2L-T, it is a turbocharged 2.4 L (2,446 cc) SOHC (single overhead cam) engine with 8 valves. The bore and stroke is 92 mm × 92 mm (3.62 in × 3.62 in). Due to the EFI system, the 2L-TE develops significantly more torque than its predecessor. The redline of this engine is at 4800 rpm, the compression ratio is 20.0:1. The 2L-TE was largely replaced by the KZ engine in 1993, although it continued to be used in some models until 2000.

Applications:

96 PS (71 kW; 95 hp) at 4000rpm, 19.5 kg⋅m (191 N⋅m; 141 lb⋅ft) at 2400rpm (Gross JIS)

- 1982−1983, 6th generation Crown Hardtop/Crown Sedan (LS111) with automatic transmission
- 1983−1984, 7th generation Crown Hardtop/Crown Sedan/Crown Wagon (LS120/120G) with automatic transmission

=== 2L-TE(II) ===
The 2L-TE(II) is an upgrade of the 2L-TE. Of the same dimensions as the 2L-TE engine, the most significant change is that the camshaft lifts the valve directly via tappet instead of a rocker arm. The valve clearance is adjusted using shims (the earlier heads were prone to cracking under high temperatures because of a cooling chamber that runs between the intake and exhaust valves and allows for steam build up at high temperature - part number 11101-54120, that was fixed in the later 2nd gen heads - part number 11101-54121). Compression ratio is also increased to 21.0:1, slightly higher than the 2L-T and 2L-TE. Maximum horsepower is 97 PS (71 kW; 96 hp) at 3800rpm and maximum torque ranges from 22.5 kg⋅m (221 N⋅m; 163 lb⋅ft) to 24.5 kg⋅m (240 N⋅m; 177 lb⋅ft) at 2400rpm.

Applications

97 PS (71 kW; 96 hp) at 3800 rpm, 22.5 kg⋅m (221 N⋅m; 163 lb⋅ft) at 2400 rpm (Net JIS)

- 1993−1995, 9th generation Crown Sedan/Crown Wagon (LS130/130W/131H) and Crown Hardtop (LS141)
- 10th generation Crown Sedan/Crown Hardtop (LS151/151H)
- Comfort (LXS11)
- Mark II/Chaser/Cresta (LX90/LX100)

97 PS (71 kW; 96 hp) at 3800 rpm, 24.5 kg⋅m (240 N⋅m; 177 lb⋅ft) at 2400 rpm (Net JIS)

- 6th generation Hilux
- 2nd generation Hilux Surf (LN130G/LN130W)
- 1st generation Land Cruiser Prado (LJ70)
- 1990-1993, 4th generation Hiace (LH120G)

=== 2L-THE ===
Introduced in 1984, the High Pressure turbocharged version of 2L-TE features ceramic pre-combustion chambers. In this engine, the fuel is injected with a high pressure system. Bore and stroke remains the same, 92 mm × 92 mm (3.62 in × 3.62 in) for both however compression is increased to 21:1. The maximum output was 94–105 PS (69–77 kW; 93–104 hp) at 4000 rpm and maximum torque was 20.5–22.5 kg⋅m (201–221 N⋅m; 148–163 lb⋅ft). The engine comes with a Turbo charger and used the EFI (Electronic Fuel Injection) system as well. Ignition feedback control would be added in 1985.

Applications:

105 PS (77 kW; 104 hp) at 4000 rpm, 21.5 kg⋅m (211 N⋅m; 156 lb⋅ft) at 2400 rpm (Gross, Japan)

94 PS (69 kW; 93 hp) at 4000 rpm, 20.5 kg⋅m (201 N⋅m; 148 lb⋅ft) at 2400 rpm (Net, Japan)

- 1984−1985, 7th generation Crown Hardtop/Crown Sedan/Crown Wagon (LS120/120G)
- 8th generation Crown Hardtop/Crown Sedan/Crown Wagon (LS130/130G) with automatic transmission

=== 2L-THE(II) ===
Has the same dimensions and is still referred to as the 2L-THE engine, the most significant change is that the camshaft lifts the valve directly via tappet instead of a rocker arm. The valve clearance is adjusted using shims.

Applications: 100 PS (74 kW; 99 hp) at 3800 rpm, 22.5 kg⋅m (221 N⋅m; 163 lb⋅ft) at 2400 rpm (Net JIS)

- 1991−1993, 9th generation Crown Sedan/Crown Wagon (LS130/130W/131H) and Crown Hardtop (LS141)

== 3L ==
The 3L is a 2.8 L (2,779 cc) four-cylinder diesel engine. The bore and stroke of this engine is 96 mm × 96 mm (3.78 in × 3.78 in), and the compression ratio of 22.2:1.

Applications:

- 2nd generation Land Cruiser Prado

91 PS (67 kW; 90 hp) at 4000 rpm, 19.2 kg⋅m (188 N⋅m; 139 lb⋅ft) at 2400 rpm (Net JIS)

- 2nd Generation Hilux Surf/4Runner (LN131V)
- 4th generation Hiace (LH107/103/105/109/113/115/117/119/123/125/129/)
- 1995−1999, 2nd generation Quick Delivery 100(LH81VH/LY151)[better source needed]
- 1988-onwards 5th generation Toyoace/Dyna 150 (LY50/60)
- 7th generation Toyoace/Dyna (4th generation Hiace Truck - LY101/111/151/161)

91 PS (67 kW; 90 hp) at 4000 rpm, 19.2 kg⋅m (188 N⋅m; 139 lb⋅ft) at 2400 rpm (Net JIS)

87 PS (64 kW; 86 hp) at 3800 rpm, 18.2 kg⋅m (178 N⋅m; 132 lb⋅ft) at 2400 rpm (Thailand, EEC)

- 5th generation Toyota Hilux

89 PS (65 kW; 88 hp) at 4000 rpm, 18.9 kg⋅m (185 N⋅m; 137 lb⋅ft) at 2400 rpm (Philippines)/(Malaysia, SAE Net)/(UN Spec)

- 6th generation Toyota Hilux

== 5L ==
The 5L is a 3.0 L (2,985 cc) four-cylinder diesel engine. Bore and stroke is 99.5 mm × 96 mm (3.92 in × 3.78 in), with a compression ratio of 22.2:1.

Applications:

- Crown Comfort (LXS12)
- 2nd generation Land Cruiser Prado

91 PS (67 kW; 90 hp) at 4000 rpm, 19.5 kg⋅m (191 N⋅m; 141 lb⋅ft) at 2400 rpm (Net JIS)

- 1999−2001, 2nd generation Quick Delivery 100(LH82K/LY152)
- 2001−2004, 3rd generation Urban Transporter (LY228K/LY270)
- 7th generation Toyoace/Dyna

91 PS (67 kW; 90 hp) at 4000 rpm, 19.5 kg⋅m (191 N⋅m; 141 lb⋅ft) at 2400 rpm (Net JIS)

89 PS (65 kW; 88 hp) at 4000 rpm, 20.1 kg⋅m (197 N⋅m; 145 lb⋅ft) at 2400 rpm (Australia, DIN)

90 PS (66 kW; 89 hp) at 4000 rpm, 19.6 kg⋅m (192 N⋅m; 142 lb⋅ft) at 2400 rpm (Thailand, EEC Net) 96 PS (71 kW; 95 hp) Gross 1998-1999 model

- 6th generation Hilux

90 PS (66 kW; 89 hp) at 4000 rpm, 19.6 kg⋅m (192 N⋅m; 142 lb⋅ft) at 2400 rpm (Australia)

91 PS (67 kW; 90 hp) at 4000 rpm, 19.6 kg⋅m (192 N⋅m; 142 lb⋅ft) at 2400 rpm (Philippines)

- 4th generation Hiace (LH154/162/164/166/168/172/174/176/182/184/186/188)

90 PS (66 kW; 89 hp) at 4000 rpm, 19.6 kg⋅m (192 N⋅m; 142 lb⋅ft) at 2400 rpm

- 4th generation Kijang (also known as the Toyota Condor/Condor Panel van - LF61/81/85)

89 PS (65 kW; 88 hp) at 4000 rpm, 19.6 kg⋅m (192 N⋅m; 142 lb⋅ft) at 2400–2800 rpm

- Dyna 150 (LY235)

=== 5L-E ===
The 5L-E is a 3.0 L (2,985 cc) EFI version of the 5L engine. It is the latest member of the L family. It has a bore and stroke of 99.5 mm × 96 mm (3.92 in × 3.78 in), with a compression ratio of 22.2:1. Output (as fitted to the Hilux) is 78 kW (106 PS; 105 hp) gross at 4200 rpm with 20.1 kg⋅m (197 N⋅m; 145 lb⋅ft) gross of torque at 2200 rpm. Power output varies according to fitment. The engine number is found on the top face of the block at the front of the engine.

Applications:

98 PS (72 kW; 97 hp) at 4200 rpm, 19.6 kg⋅m (192 N⋅m; 142 lb⋅ft) at 2400 rpm (SABS)

96 PS (71 kW; 95 hp) at 4000 rpm, 22.4 kg⋅m (220 N⋅m; 162 lb⋅ft) at 2600 rpm (Thailand, EEC Net) 105 PS (77 kW; 104 hp) Gross 2000-2001 Standard cab and Extra Cab

96 PS (71 kW; 95 hp) at 4000 rpm, 20.4 kg⋅m (200 N⋅m; 148 lb⋅ft) at 2600 rpm (Thailand, EEC Net) 105 PS (77 kW; 104 hp) Gross 2000-on model

- 6th generation Hilux

95 PS (70 kW; 94 hp) at 4000 rpm, 20.1 kg⋅m (197 N⋅m; 145 lb⋅ft) at 2400 rpm (UN Spec)

- 3rd generation Land Cruiser Prado (LJ120)

95 PS (70 kW; 94 hp) at 4000 rpm, 20.1 kg⋅m (197 N⋅m; 145 lb⋅ft) at 2200 rpm (UN Spec)

- 1st and 2nd generation Fortuner (LAN50L/155L)
- 4th generation Land Cruiser Prado (LJ150)
- 5th generation Hiace (LH202)
- 7th and 8th generation Hilux (LAN25/125L)

== See also ==
- List of Toyota engines
