= Toyota Camry =

Japanese mid-size car

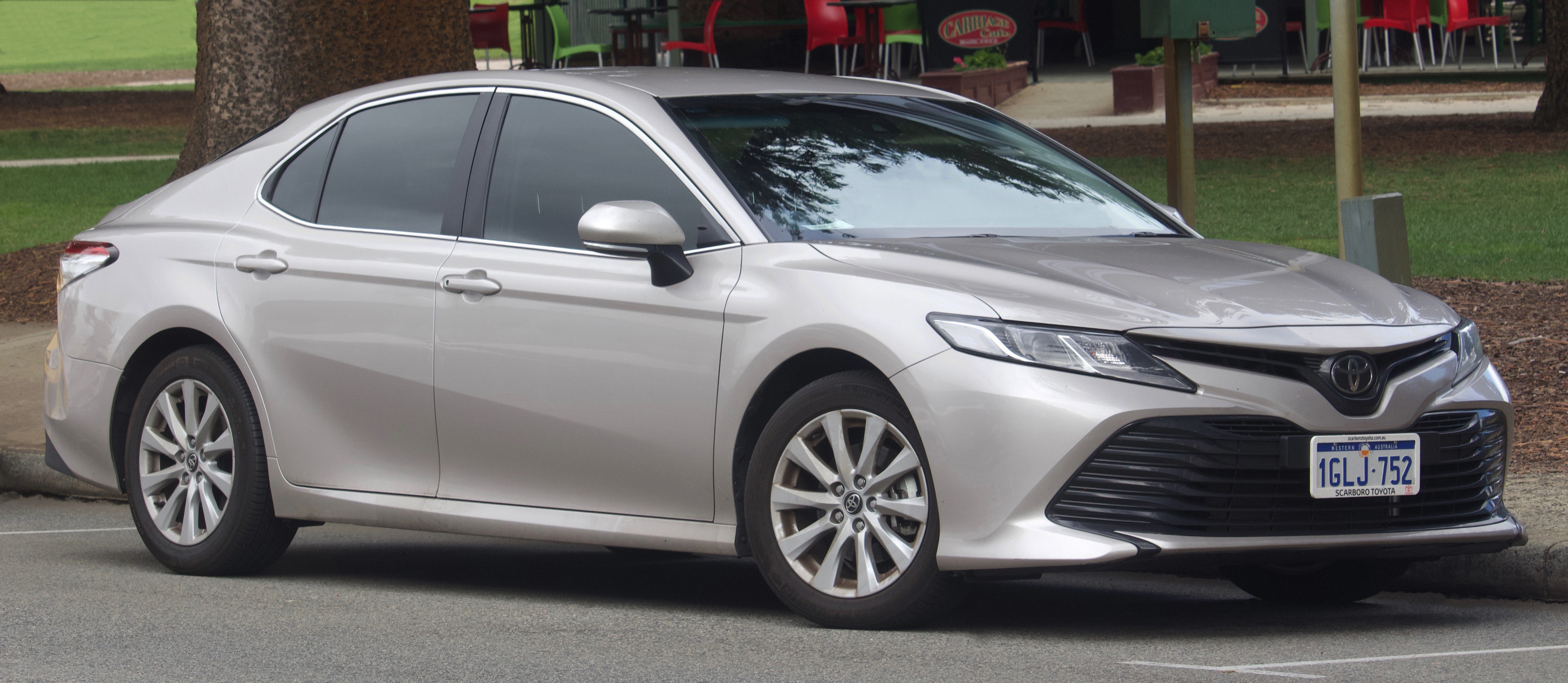
- 2018 Toyota Camry Ascent (ASV70, Australia)

Overview
- Manufacturer: Toyota
- Also called: Toyota Vista (Japan, 1982–1998); Toyota Scepter (Japan, 1992–1996); Toyota Vienta (Australia, 1995–2000); Toyota Aurion (Australia, 2006–2017); Daihatsu Altis (Japan, 2000–2023); Holden Apollo (Australia, 1989–1996)
- Production: March 1982 – present

Body and chassis
- Class: Compact car: 1982–1998 (narrow-body); Mid-size car: 1991–present (wide-body)
- Layout: Front-engine, front-wheel-drive (1982–present); Front-engine, four-wheel-drive (1986–2011, 2019–present)

Chronology
- Predecessor: Toyota Celica Camry; Toyota Corona (Asia, for XV20 model); Toyota Avensis (Europe, for XV70 model)
- Successor: Toyota Avensis (Europe, for XV30 model)

The Toyota Camry (/ˈkæmri/; Japanese: トヨタ・カムリ Toyota Kamuri) is an automobile sold internationally by the Japanese auto manufacturer Toyota since 1982, spanning multiple generations. Originally compact in size (narrow-body), the Camry has grown since the 1990s to fit the mid-size classification (wide-body)—although the two widths co-existed in that decade. Since the release of the wide-bodied versions, Camry has been extolled by Toyota as the firm's second "world car" after the Corolla. As of 2022, the Camry is positioned above the Corolla and below the Avalon or Crown in several markets.

The Camry is one of the best-selling automobiles of all time, with worldwide sales of over 22 million as of 2026. In Japan, the Camry was originally exclusive to Toyota Corolla Store retail dealerships. Narrow-body cars also spawned a rebadged sibling in Japan, the Toyota Vista (トヨタ・ビスタ) — also introduced in 1982 but sold at Toyota Vista Store locations. Diesel fuel versions have previously retailed at Toyota Diesel Store. The Vista Ardeo was a wagon version of the Vista V50.

== Etymology ==
The name "Camry" derives from the Japanese word kanmuri (冠, かんむり, "crown"). This follows Toyota's naming tradition of using the crown name for primary models, starting with the Toyota Crown (1955). The tradition continued with the Toyota Corona (1957) and Corolla (1966), the Latin words for "crown" and "small crown" respectively. Further maintaining this theme was the Toyota Tiara (1960), named after the "tiara" form of crown. In 1980, the Toyota Cresta, based on the Toyota Mark II, was introduced to Japan only; cresta is Latin for a decorative, ceremonial feature added to the top of a helmet. The rebadged Camry variant for Japan, the Toyota Scepter (1991), took its name from the word "scepter", a royal accessory to a crown. The Atara trim level name, used on the Camry in Australia since 2011, means "crown" in Hebrew (in Hebrew script עטרה).

== History ==
Between 1979 and 1982, the Camry nameplate was delegated to a four-door sedan model in Japan, known as the Celica Camry. When Camry became an independent model line in 1982 with the V10 series, Toyota made it available as a five-door liftback in addition to the sedan. The subsequent Camry V20 series, debuted in 1986 with a station wagon substituting for the liftback body variant and Japan-only hardtop sedans making their debut. The company replaced the V20 in 1990 with the V30 sedan and hardtop, but this model series was exclusive to Japan. Automotive tax regulations in that country dictated the retention of a narrower body as used in previous Camry generations. However, overseas demand for a larger Camry resulted in the development of a wide-body XV10 sedan and station wagon that arrived in 1991. Japan also received the wider XV10 as the Toyota Scepter (トヨタ・セプター). The company then issued an XV10-bodied coupé in 1993 that was spun off in 1998 as an independent model line, titled Camry Solara.

When the Japanese market received a new narrow-body V40 series in 1994 to replace V30, the wide-body XV10 continued unchanged. Its replacement, the XV20, arrived in 1996—named Camry Gracia in Japan. It was not until the narrow V40 ended manufacture in 1998 that the Camry in Japan was to again mirror the cars sold internationally. Japanese sedans dropped the Gracia suffix in 1999, although it was retained by the wagon until its 2001 demise. From 1998, the Vista ended its Camry alignment, and instead branched into an independent model line with the V50 series for an extra generation before the nameplate was withdrawn in 2003.

The next wide-body model, the XV30, came in 2001. Now sold only as a sedan, it now offered two different front- and rear-end design treatments. Japan and most global markets received one style; a separate, more conservative version covered markets in East and Southeast Asia. With the XV40 of 2006, the Camry-derived Aurion become the donor model for the more conservative Camry sold in this region. The subsequent XV50 series, sold from 2011 until 2019, has resulted in even more markets adopting the alternative body panels, such as Japan and Eastern Europe. The current generation is called the XV70.

When Toyota launched their luxury Lexus brand in 1989, it offered a close derivative of the Camry/Vista hardtop sedan as the Lexus ES. The relationship continues to this day, but over the generations, the ES—sold as the Toyota Windom in Japan from 1991 through to 2005—gravitated further away from its Camry brethren. Between 2000 and 2010, and then 2012 and 2023, Daihatsu had offered a badge engineered Camry as the Daihatsu Altis (ダイハツ・アルティス) sold only in Japan. Badge engineering has also occurred in Australia with the Holden Apollo between 1989 and 1996. From 1993, Toyota Australia badged V6-engined versions as Camry Vienta, becoming Toyota Vienta in 1995 until the badge's departure in 2000. Between 2006 and 2017, the Toyota Aurion model from Australia was derived from the V6 Camry, but with revised front-end and rear-end styling treatment and a partially refurbished cabin.

Sales of the Camry ended in late 2023 for the Japanese market after 43 years as the result of poor sales. However, Toyota plans to reintroduce it to the Japanese market in 2026.

== Timeline ==
Toyota Camry timeline, 1979–present
Class	1970s	1980s										1990s										2000s										2010s										2020s						
Class	9	0	1	2	3	4	5	6	7	8	9	0	1	2	3	4	5	6	7	8	9	0	1	2	3	4	5	6	7	8	9	0	1	2	3	4	5	6	7	8	9	0	1	2	3	4	5	6
Narrow-body		Celica Camry			Camry/Vista (V10)				Camry/Vista (V20)				Camry/Vista (V30)				Camry/Vista (V40)				Vista (V50)																											
Wide-body														Camry/Scepter (XV10)					Camry (XV20)					Camry (XV30)					Camry/Aurion (XV40)					Camry/Aurion (XV50)						Camry (XV70)						Camry (XV80)		

== Narrow-body ==
=== Celica Camry (A40/A50; 1979–1982) ===
Toyota Celica Camry
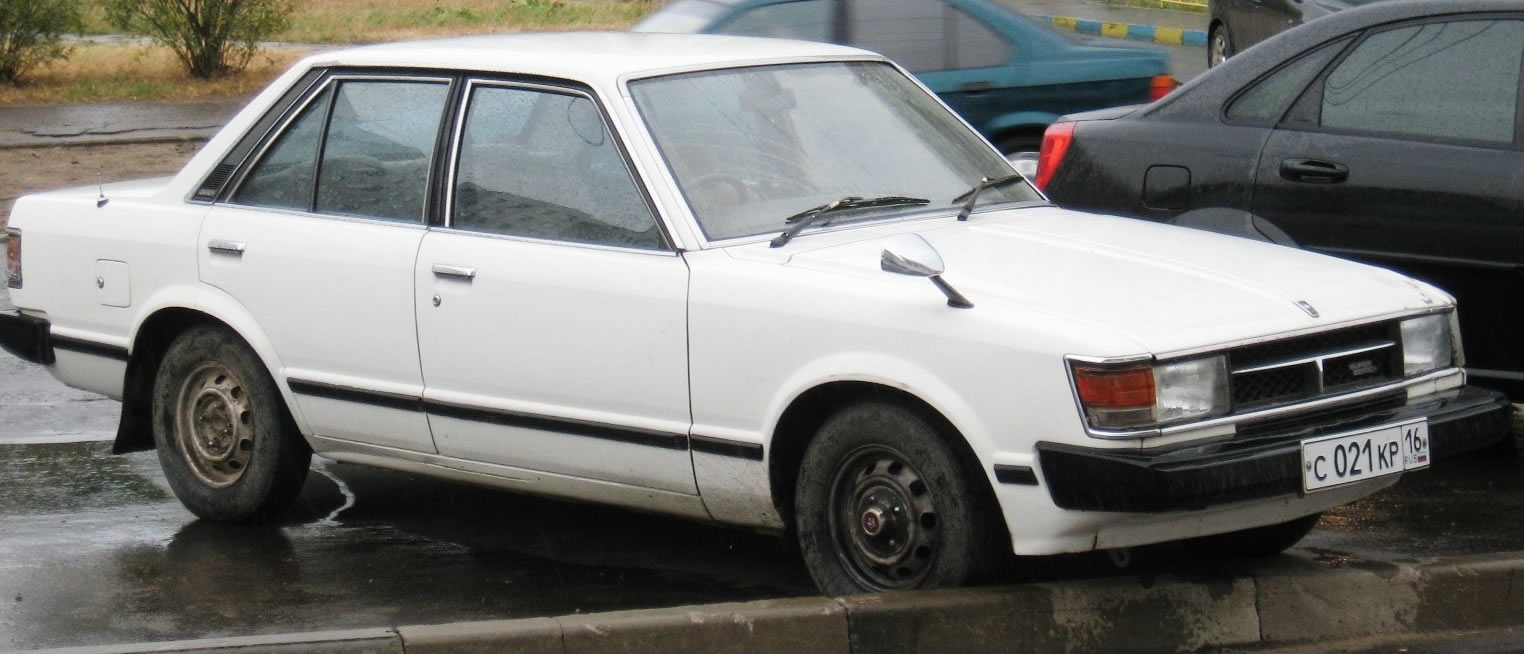
- Celica Camry XT Super Edition (Japan)

Overview
- Model code: A40; A50
- Production: December 1979 – March 1982
- Assembly: Japan: Toyota, Aichi (Tsutsumi plant)

Body and chassis
- Body style: 4-door sedan
- Layout: Front-engine, rear-wheel drive
- Related: Toyota Celica; Toyota Supra; Toyota Carina

Powertrain
- Engine: 1,588 cc 12T-U OHV I4 (TA41); 1,770 cc 13T-U OHV I4 (TA46); 1,770 cc 3T-EU OHV I4 (TA57); 1,968 cc 18R-GEU DOHC I4 (RA55); 1,972 cc 21R-U SOHC I4 (RA56)
- Transmission: 5-speed manual; 4-speed automatic

Dimensions
- Wheelbase: 2,500 mm (98.4 in)
- Length: 4,350–4,445 mm (171.3–175.0 in)
- Width: 1,645 mm (64.8 in)
- Height: 1,390 mm (54.7 in)
- Curb weight: 980–1,060 kg (2,161–2,337 lb)

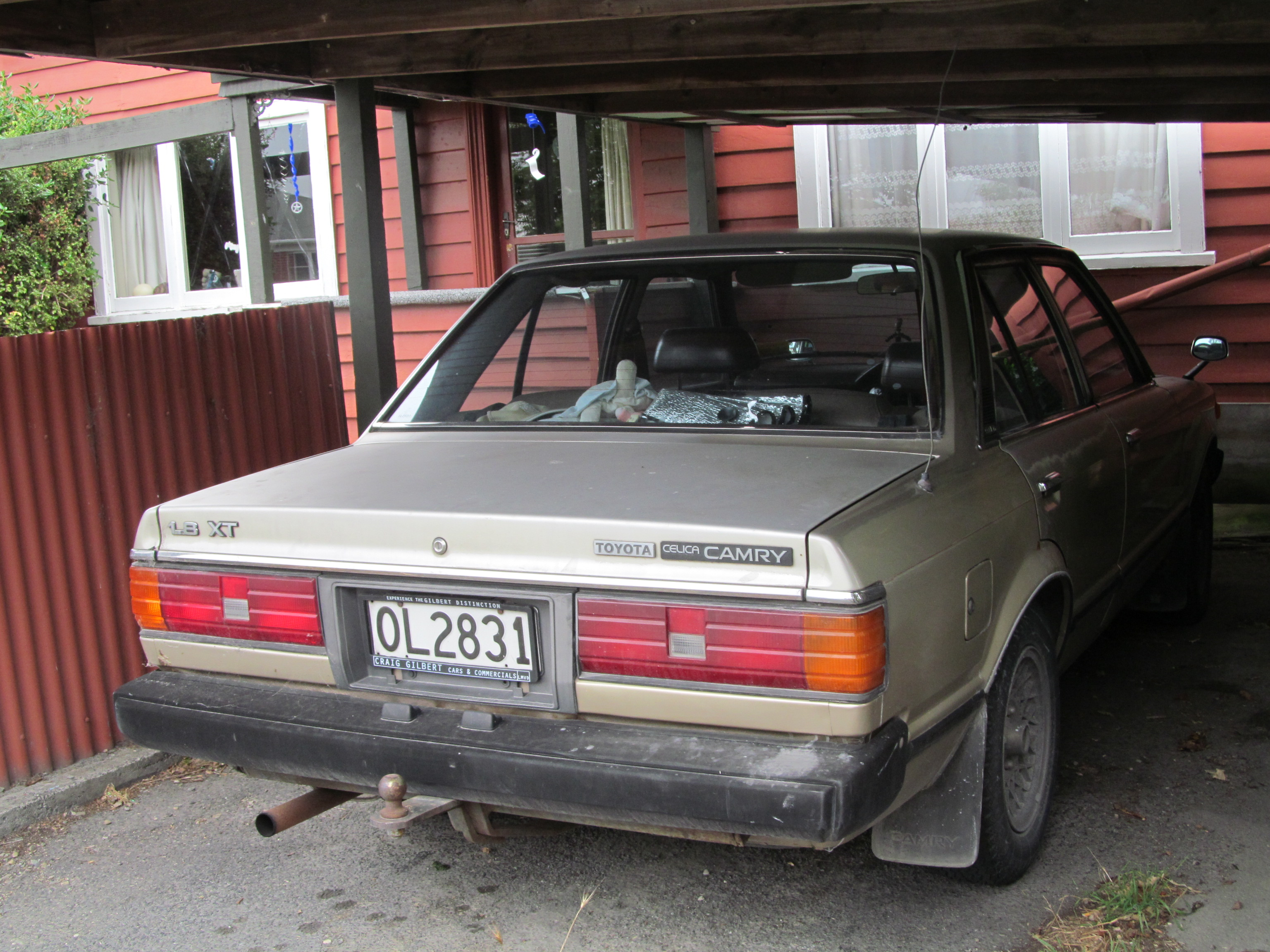
Rear view of Toyota Celica Camry 1.8 XT

The "Camry" nameplate originated on a four-door sedan similar to the Toyota Celica called the Celica Camry. Toyota designated this initial application of the Camry name as the A40/A50 series. Celica Camry made its sales debut in January 1980 at Toyota Corolla Store retail dealerships where it was the largest sedan at the network in Japan. Production had earlier commenced in December 1979 at the Tsutsumi plant at Toyota, Aichi. Despite the marketing position, Celica Camry shares few components with its namesake—but rather the Carina (A40/A50). Toyota modified the Carina by elongating its front-end and incorporating styling cues such as the T-bar grille motif that resembled the Celica XX/Supra (A40). Strictly speaking, Celica Camry is not the first generation of Camry, but rather its predecessor.

Celica Camry uses the front-engine, rear-wheel-drive layout and in A40 guise, a standard four-link rigid axle suspension system with gasoline inline-four engines displacing 1.6 liters for the 12T-U (TA41) and 1.8 liters with the 13T-U (TA46). Initial model grades comprised: 1600 LT, 1600 XT, 1800 LT, 1800 XT, and 1800 XT Super Edition. In August 1980, Toyota released high-end models with four-wheel independent suspension, denoted A50 (front MacPherson struts, rear semi-trailing arm setup; four-wheel disc brakes) to position top trim package equipped vehicles as offering the aleticism associated with the Celica and the XX while offering the convenience of four doors. For the TA57 series 1800 SX, Toyota fitted the 1.8-liter 3T-EU engine. Toyota designated the new 2.0-liter grades, the 21R-U powered 2000 SE and 18R-GEU-based 2000 GT as RA56 and RA55, respectively.

The Celica Camry was available in six exterior colors with contrasting blue, gray, or brown interiors, and the XT Super Edition offered two-tone exterior paint in dark brown over light brown. Power steering with adjustable tilt steering, air conditioning, two stereo choices, a choice of a digital or electric analog clock, rear window defroster, and rear child door lockout were available. The side-view mirrors installed on the fenders ahead of the front wheels were electrically adjustable on higher trim packages and manually adjustable on entry-level models. The aluminum alloy wheels were shared with the Celica and Supra on higher trim packages.

=== V10 (1982–1986) ===
V10
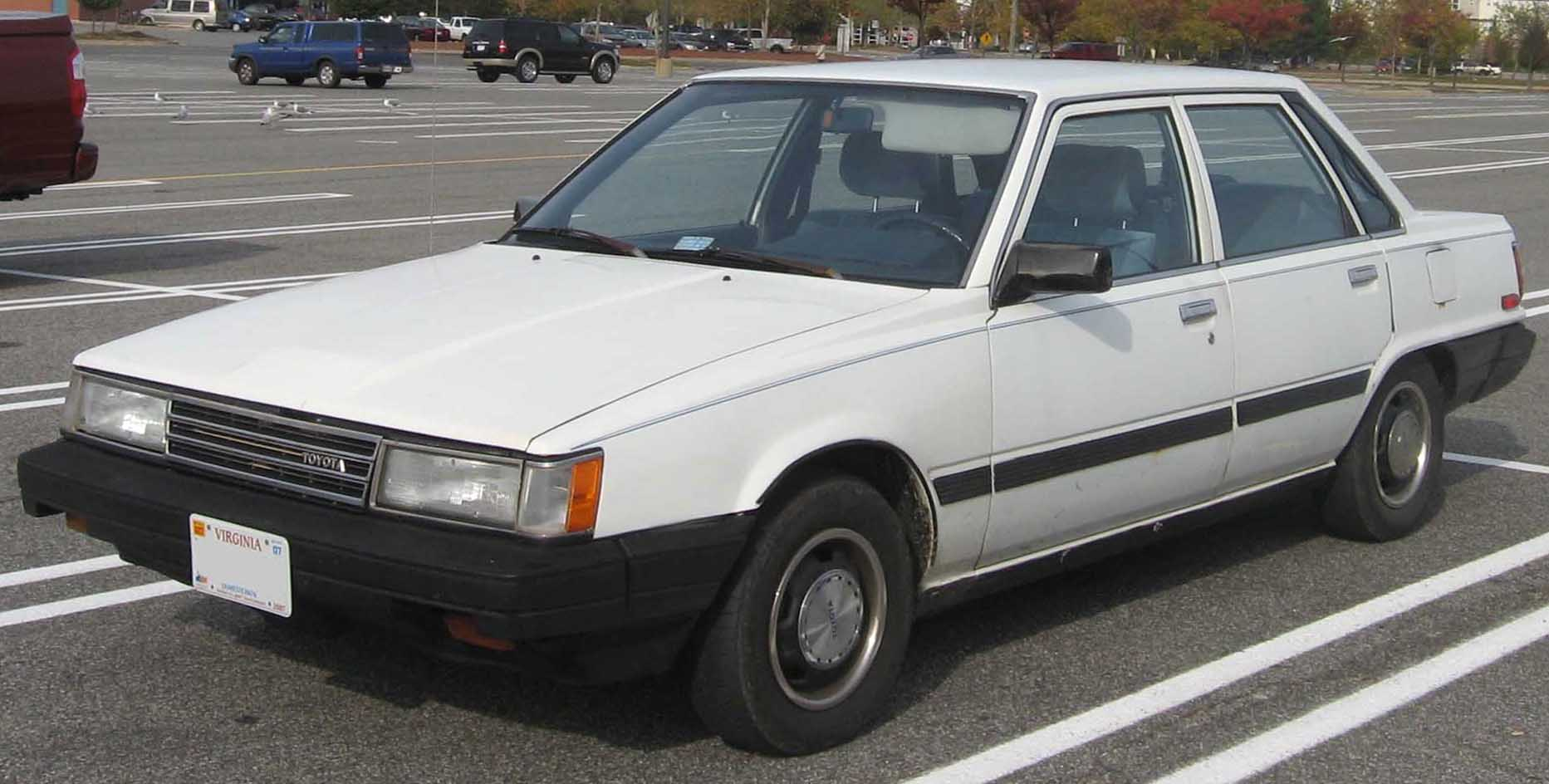
- Camry DX sedan (US; facelift)

Overview
- Model code: V10
- Also called: Toyota Vista (Japan)
- Production: March 1982 – August 1986
- Model years: 1983–1986
- Assembly: Japan: Toyota, Aichi (Tsutsumi plant)

Body and chassis
- Body style: 4-door sedan; 5-door liftback
- Layout: Transverse front-engine, front-wheel-drive

Powertrain
- Engine: gasoline: 1.8 L 1S-L, -LU, -iLU I4; 2.0 L 2S-EL, -ELC, -ELU I4; 2.0 L 3S-GELU DOHC 16V I4; diesel: 1.8 L 1C-TL, -TLC turbo I4; 2.0 L 2C-TL, -TLC turbo I4
- Transmission: 5-speed manual; 4-speed automatic

Dimensions
- Wheelbase: 2,600 mm (102.4 in)
- Length: 4,400–4,435 mm (173.2–174.6 in) (sedan); 4,435 mm (174.6 in) (liftback)
- Width: 1,690 mm (66.5 in)
- Height: 1,395 mm (54.9 in) (sedan); 1,370 mm (53.9 in) (liftback)
- Curb weight: 990–1,130 kg (2,180–2,490 lb)

Toyota began production of the first-generation Camry series in March 1982 at the Tsutsumi plant. Designated the model code V10, when fitted with S-series gasoline engines it was known as the SV10, SV11, or SV12 depending on the exact version. Likewise, the C-series diesel versions are identified by the CV10 and CV11 codes. Released to the Japanese market on 24 March 1982, Toyota issued the V10 series as a four-door notchback sedan retailing at the Toyota Corolla Store dealerships, and the appearance shared a design philosophy with the all-new Celica XX and the all-new Celica coupe and liftback. At the same time, a twinned model—the Toyota Vista—launched as a rebadged Camry sold at separate Toyota Vista Store locations. Five-door liftback versions of the Vista came to the market in August 1982, although outside of export markets the Camry remained exclusively a sedan. These cars served above the comparably sized Toyota Carina and Corona in the Toyota hierarchy. Unlike the preceding Celica Camry, exports were achieved with the first generation Camry to Australia, Europe and North America.

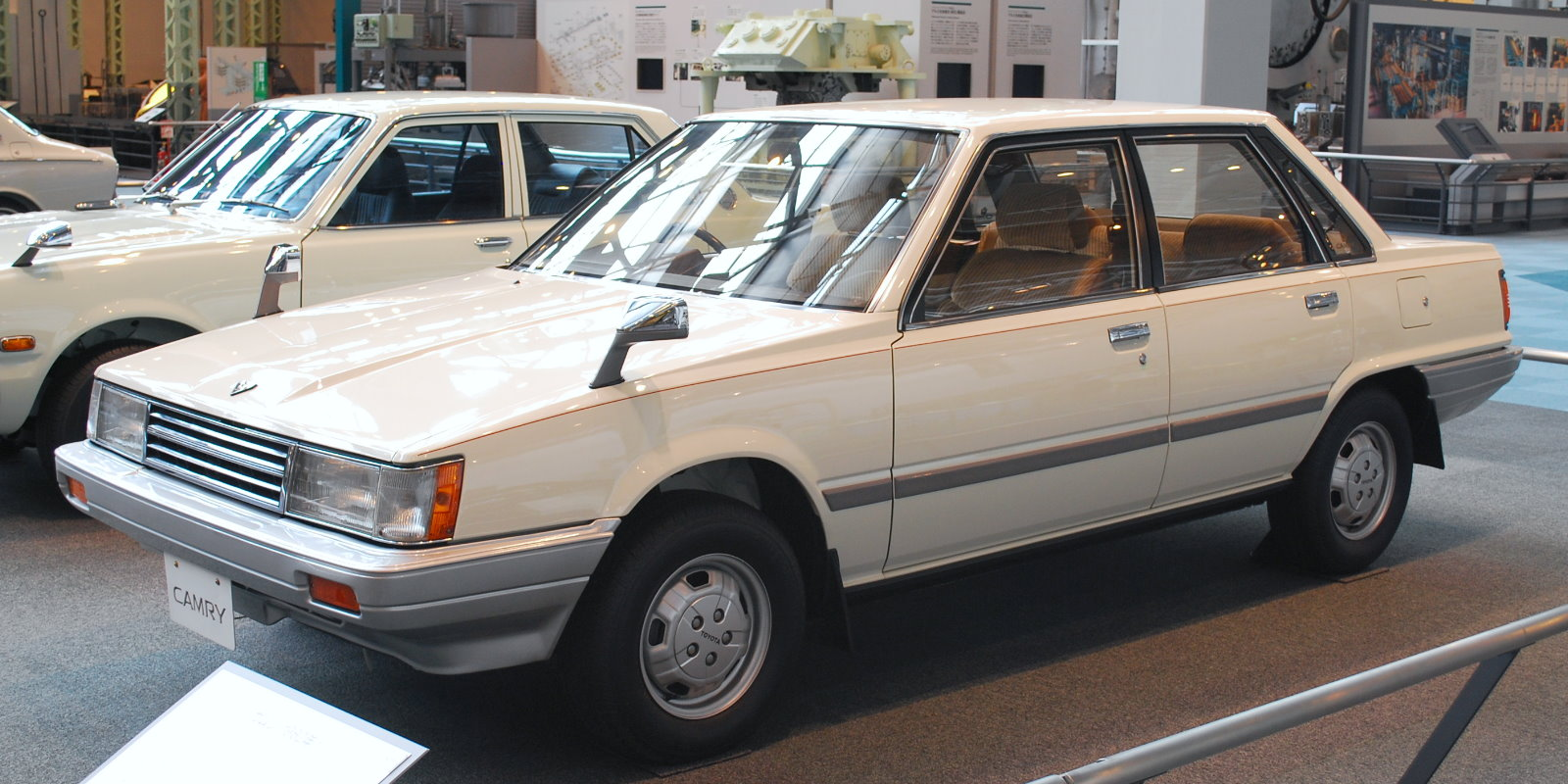

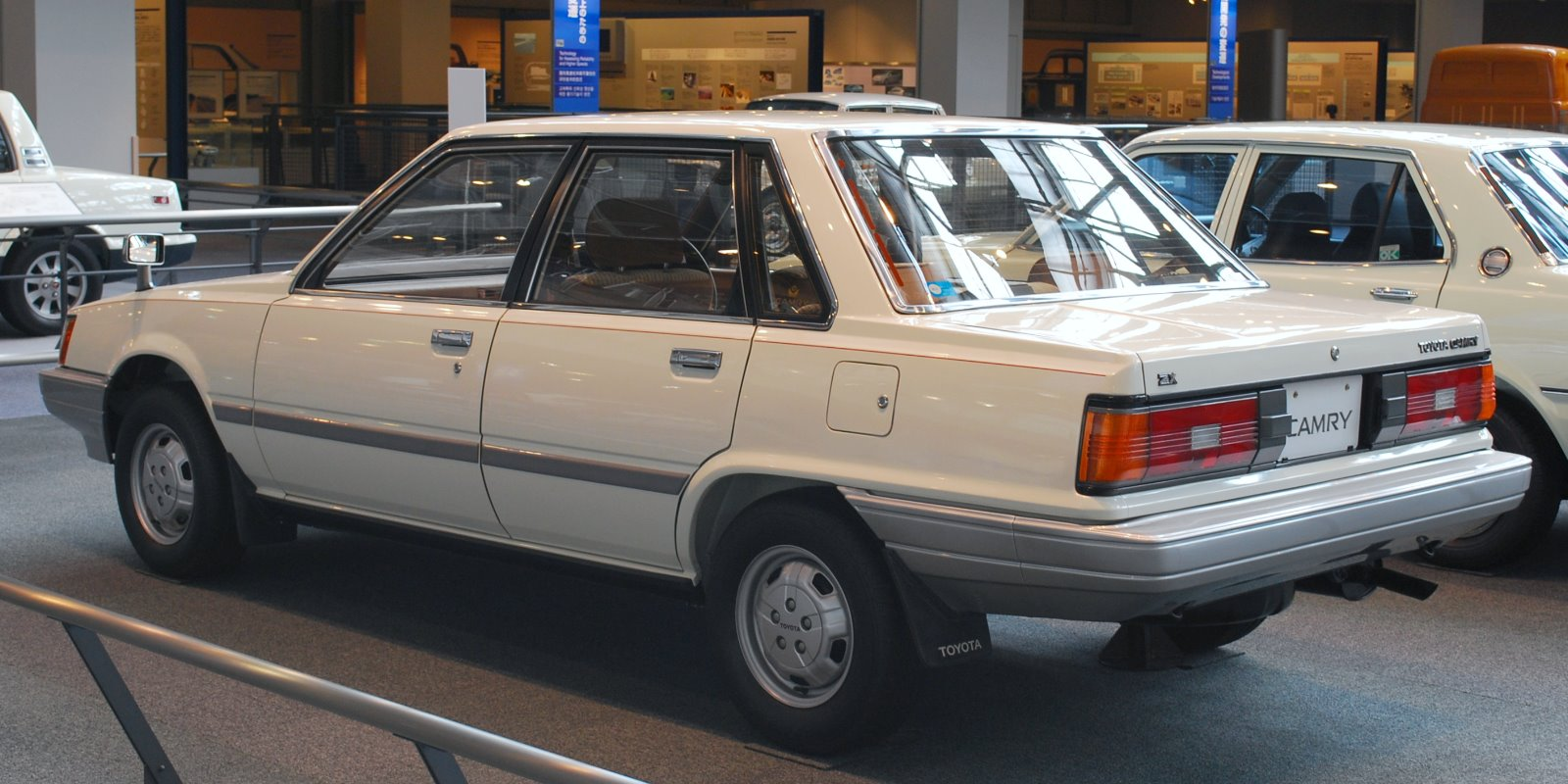
Camry ZX sedan (Japan; pre-facelift)

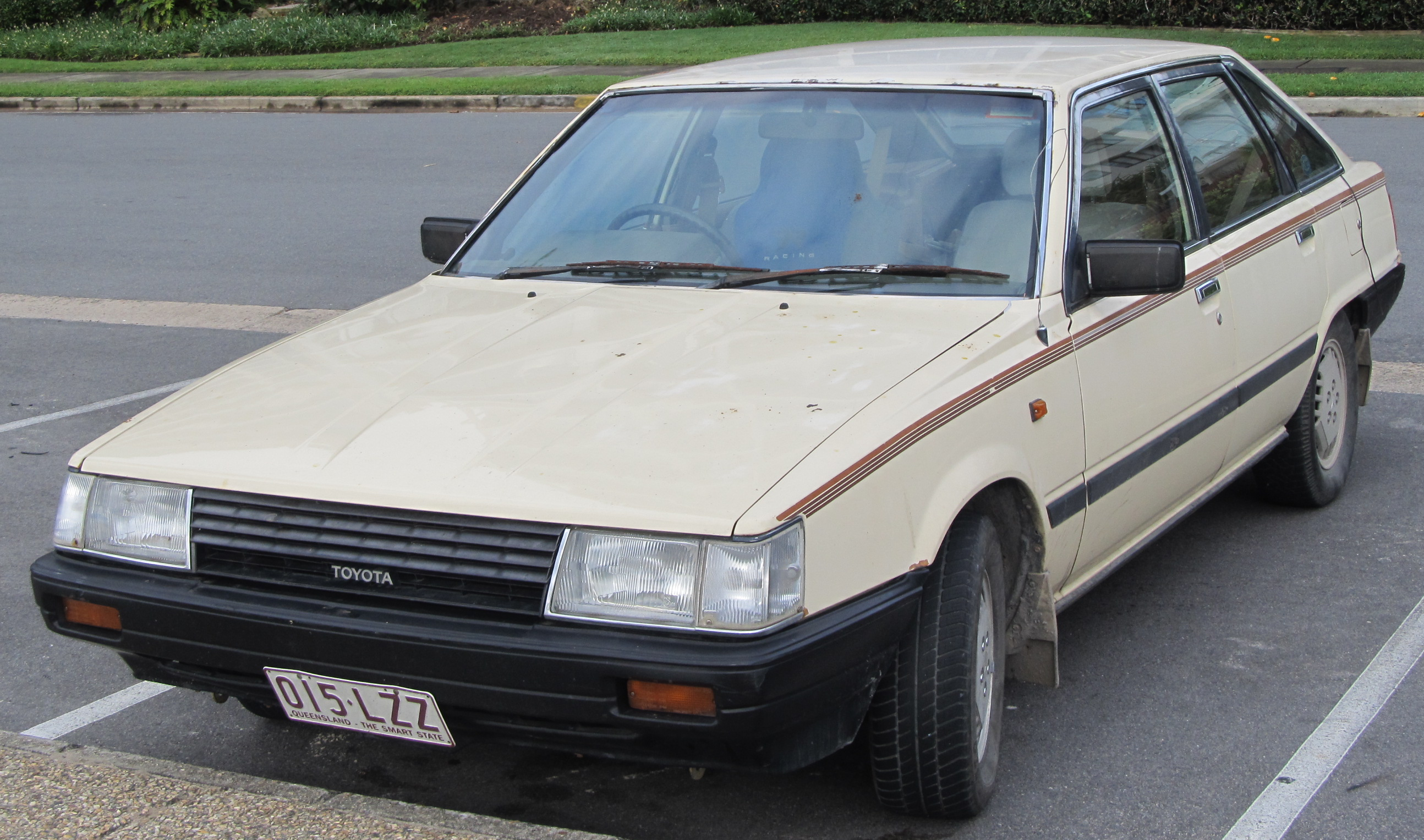
Camry GLi liftback (Australia; pre-facelift)

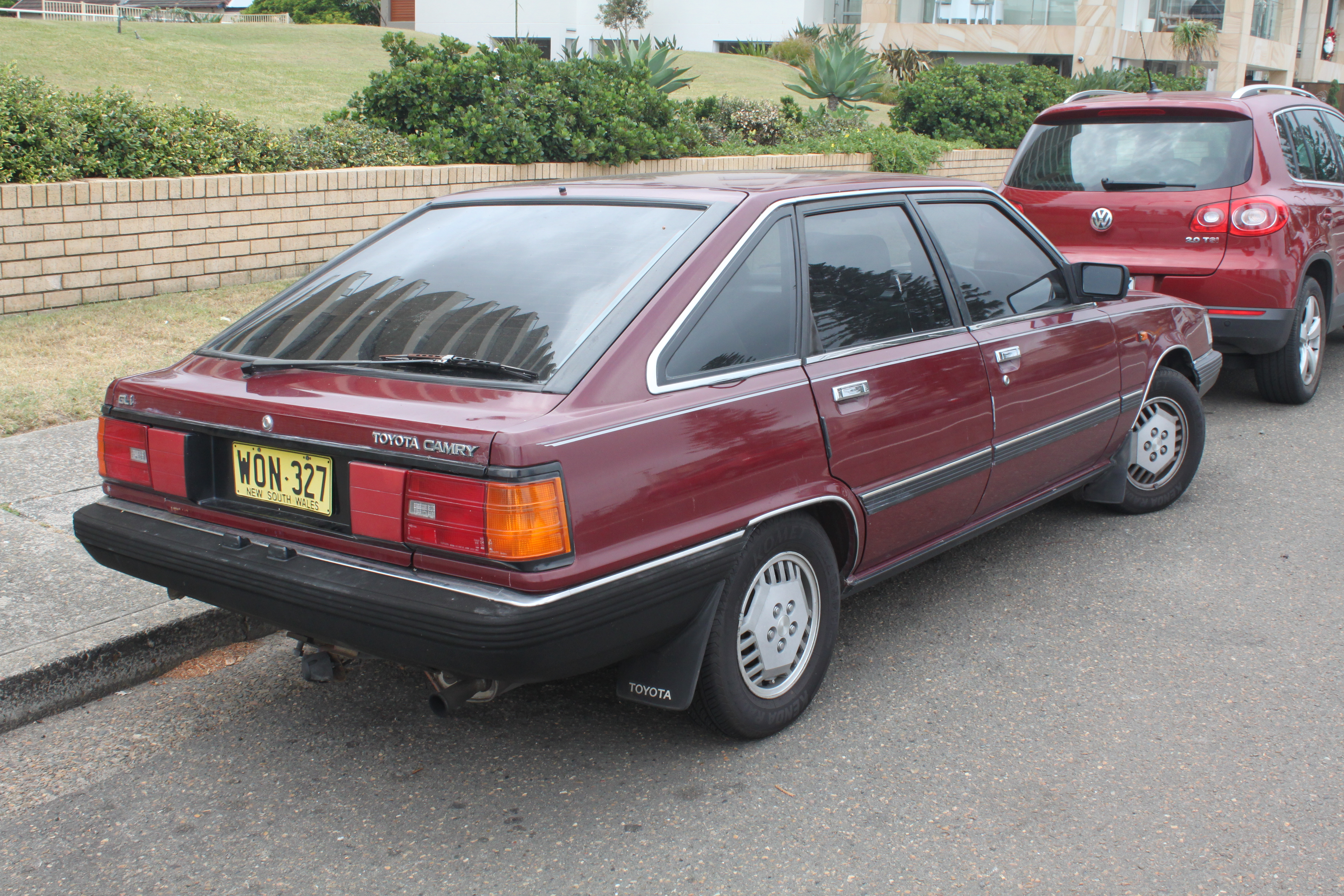
Camry GLi liftback (Australia; pre-facelift)

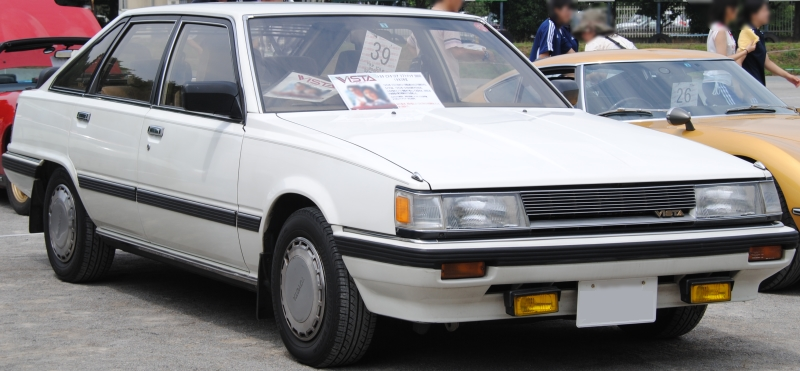
Vista liftback (Japan; facelift)

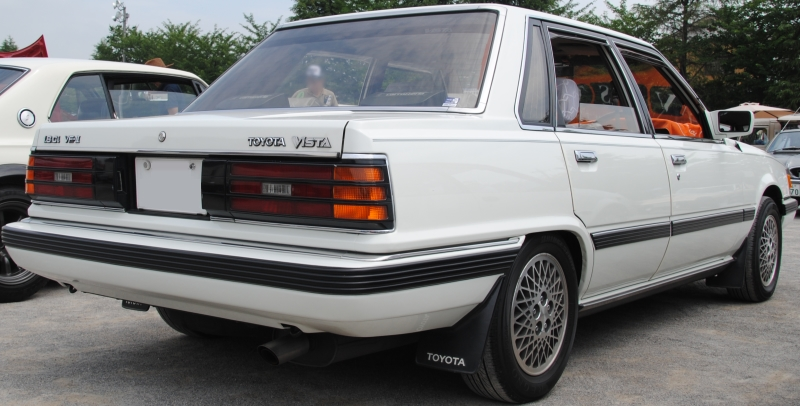
Vista VF-II sedan (Japan; facelift)

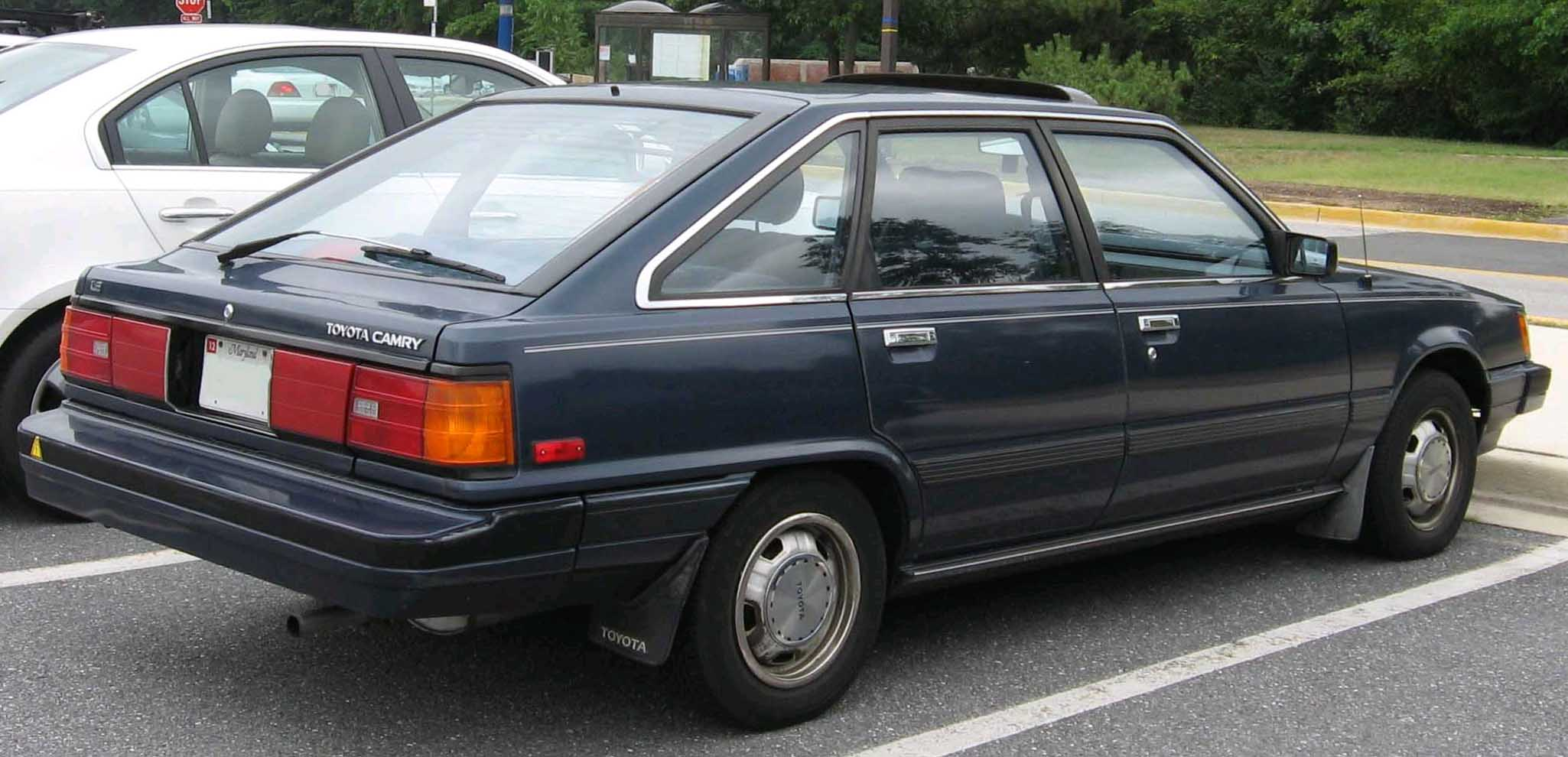
Camry LE liftback (US; facelift)

Development of the V10 series Camry and Vista began in August 1977 following the 1973 oil crisis and would later cover the 1979 crisis. Automobile manufacturers increasingly shifted toward downsized, lighter, more fuel efficient cars with better aerodynamic performance. The industry also began wide-scale switching from the rear-wheel-drive layout to the lighter and more compact front-wheel-drive in the interest of increased fuel economy. With a development focus on exports, particularly to the US, Toyota designed Camry to replace the Toyota Corona (T130) in many overseas markets. It needed to compete with the compact, front-drive Honda Accord sedan from Japan. The Camry had a wheelbase 150 mm (5.9 in) longer than that of the Honda Accord. The design brief also established the compact front-wheel-drive X platform vehicles by General Motors in the US as competitors. In light of this competition—and a first for Toyota—the V10 adopted front-wheel drive with the engine transversely mounted. Between this layout that reduced the size of the engine compartment, the notchback sedan and liftback bodies with rear quarter windows, and the longer wheelbase of 2,600 mm (102.4 in)—the V10 series was considered spacious for its time and class. Furthermore, by situating the fuel tank underneath the back seat, luggage space is increased. The styling of the V10 followed the box-shaped trends characteristic of the early 1980s. Wind tunnel testing led to the fitment of drag-reducing flush pillars, a flat roofline to reduce wind buffeting, and one-piece front bumper with air dam to direct air flow. Drag coefficient is quoted at Cd=0.38 for the sedan and Cd=0.36 for the liftback.

Coil spring independent suspension features by way of a MacPherson strut type with stabilizer and strut bar up front, and a MacPherson rear setup with parallel lower arms. Steering uses a rack and pinion design; braking hardware is made up of front ventilated discs and rear drums with a double proportioning valve to suppress lock-up. Innovatively, a sensor is fitted to detect worn-out brake pads, alerted by use of an audible chime.

Powertrain design was reassessed for front-wheel-drive and this generated a foundation for which other models were developed. The transaxle is connected inline with the engine, and to create a simple and compact structure, a single rail system that replaces the three shafts normally used for each gear range with a single shaft, was adopted. In addition, automatic transmission fluid was used for the lubricating oil in order to reduce friction. Existing gasoline S- and diesel C-series engines were converted for use in transverse applications. Initially, the V10 featured the 1.8-liter 1S-LU engine good for 100 PS (74 kW) and an S50 five-speed manual transmission. From July 1982, four-speed automatic with overdrive became available after starting manufacture the previous month. The 2.0-liter 2S-ELU engine with 120 PS (88 kW) an improved S51 five-speed manual transmission and four-speed automatic followed in August. August 1983 saw the 1.8-liter 1C-TL turbocharged diesel offered (80 PS or 59 kW) exclusive to Japanese dealerships called Toyota Diesel Store. June 1984 introduced the twin-cam 2.0-liter 3S-GELU engine offered on higher trims with 140 or 160 PS (103 or 118 kW) depending on the version. For lower trims, the 85 PS (63 kW) "Ci" 1.8-liter 1S-iLU arrived. The diesel was upgraded to the 2.0-liter 2C-TL specification in August 1985 (88 PS or 65 kW).

Japanese trims levels initially comprised LT, XT, SE, and ZX for Camry sedan. Lumiere and XE grades came to the market in June 1984, and the GLi TwinCam in May 1985. Vista sedan and liftback specification levels were at first VC (sedan only), VL, VE, and VX. The VF arrived in August 1982, and VR and VS models in June 1984 at the expense of the departing VE. Special edition models comprised: VE Extra (December 1982), VL Extra (January 1983), VL Super Extra (January 1985), VF-II (April 1985 and April 1986), and VL Grand Extra (December 1985 and April 1986). Wing mirrors became door-mounted as opposed to fender-mounted in May 1983. Facelifted models arrived in June 1984 featuring a new grille, redesigned bumpers, revised tail-lamps, updated dashboard, enlarged glovebox, and general trim alterations.

The shift to smaller cars amid the oil crises doubled Japanese automobile market share from 10 to 20 percent in the United States between 1970 and 1980; thus, causing economic tensions between the two nations. Toyota then began investigating the option of building a US production facility, following the announcements in January and April 1980 by Honda and Nissan, respectively, to manufacture automobiles locally. As investigations proceeded, Toyota proposed entering a joint venture with Ford in May 1980 to produce a compact car. Toyota advocated that its Camry be manufactured at a Ford factory and sold through the sales channels of both brands, but Ford deemed Camry to be in competition with a model it was developing, which became the Ford Tempo, leading to an impasse and then the cessation of negotiations in July 1981. Increasing Japan–United States unease culminated with the Japanese government, at the urging of its US counterpart, imposing a voluntary cartel in May 1981 with a threshold for the export of motor vehicles to the US. Toyota would eventually pursue circumvention; firstly by entering into venture by forming NUMMI with General Motors in 1984 to manufacture the Toyota Corolla, and then by setting up its own facility at Georgetown, Kentucky in 1988 for the next generation Camry.

Sales of the V10 Camry in the US began in March 1983 after exports commenced in January, and by 1985 it had sold 128,000 units. Unlike other markets, federalized quad headlamps were fitted for the 1983 and 1984 model years. Buyers could specify sedan or liftback bodies with a five-speed manual transmission or extra-cost four-speed automatic paired to the 2.0-liter gasoline 2S-ELC motor rated at 92 hp (69 kW). Toyota then offered DX (deluxe) and LE (luxury edition) trim levels, the latter adding standard features such as body-colored bumpers, tachometer, tilt steering wheel, upgraded stereo, electric mirrors and variable intermittent windshield wipers. Updates for the 1984 model year included an overdrive lockout switch for the automatic transmission. Also optional was the manual-only 1.8-liter 1C-TLC turbo diesel for the DX with 73 hp (54 kW), a special gauge cluster, and quieter exhaust system. Changes for 1985 involved the facelift (now with one-piece headlamps), the transfer of the optional cruise control's switchgear from the dashboard to the wiper stalk, and wider LE-type tires for the DX trim (from 165 to 185 millimeters or 6.5 to 7.3 inches). 1985 cars received gas-charged front shock absorbers and stiffer rear springs, an anti-theft alarm system was now optional on both grades, automatic became an option for the diesel, the DX added a standard tilt steering wheel, and the LE models offered an optional electronic instrument cluster. For 1986, a replacement diesel engine, the automatic-only 2.0-liter 2C-TLC arrived for the DX and LE (79 hp or 59 kW), and the gasoline model increased power by around 3 hp (2 kW). Other revisions for this model year were a revised powered brake system and new cloth seat and door trim for LEs.

For Australia, the Camry range—based on the Vista front styling—was limited to a single-grade GLi liftback variant between April 1983 and April 1987. Sold as an upmarket alternative to the locally produced Toyota Corona (T140), the sole powertrain offered was the gasoline 2.0-liter 2S-EL engine with 77 kW (103 hp) coupled with the five-speed manual or four-speed automatic transmission. Optional extras included powering steering, air conditioning, electric moonroof, power doors and windows, plus an upgraded stereo. Facelifted models with more standard appointments arrived in August 1984, and the unleaded version from early 1986 reduced power output by 2 kW (3 hp).

Europe and the United Kingdom received both body variants when released there in mid 1984—these were available in the gasoline DX trim (1.8- 1S-L) and 2.0-liter GLi (2S-EL) or the GLD turbo diesel (1.8- 1C-TL in early models; later models upgraded to the 2.0-liter 2C-TL).

Powertrains (V10)
Model	Fuel	Engine		Power	Torque	Transmission
SV10	Gasoline	1.8 L I4	1S-LU	74 kW (100 PS) at 5,400 rpm (JP)	152 N⋅m (112 lb⋅ft) at 3,400 rpm (JP)	5-speed manual (S51); 4-speed automatic (A140E)
SV10	Gasoline	1.8 L I4	1S-L	66 kW (90 PS) at 5,200 rpm (EU)	142 N⋅m (105 lb⋅ft) at 3,400 rpm (EU)	5-speed manual (S51); 4-speed automatic (A140E)
SV10	Gasoline	1.8 L I4	1S-iLU	63 kW (85 PS) at 5,200 rpm (JP)	142 N⋅m (105 lb⋅ft) at 3,000 rpm (JP)	5-speed manual (S51); 4-speed automatic (A140E)
SV11	Gasoline	2.0 L I4	2S-ELU	88 kW (120 PS) at 5,400 rpm (JP)	173 N⋅m (127 lb⋅ft) at 4,000 rpm (JP)	5-speed manual (S51); 4-speed automatic (A140E)
SV11	Gasoline	2.0 L I4	2S-EL	77 kW (105 PS; 103 hp) at 4,800 rpm (AU/EU); 1986–1987: 75 kW (102 PS; 101 hp) (AU)	162 N⋅m (119 lb⋅ft) at 3,600 rpm (AU/EU)	5-speed manual (S51); 4-speed automatic (A140E)
SV11	Gasoline	2.0 L I4	2S-ELC	MY 1983–1985: 69 kW (92 hp) at 4,200 rpm (NA); MY 1986: 71 kW (95 hp) at 4,400 rpm (NA)	MY 1983–1985: 153 N⋅m (113 lb⋅ft) at 2,400 rpm (NA); MY 1986: 160 N⋅m (118 lb⋅ft) at 4,000 rpm (NA)	5-speed manual (S51); 4-speed automatic (A140E)
SV12	Gasoline	2.0 L DOHC 16V I4	3S-GELU	103 or 118 kW (140 or 160 PS) (JP)	172 or 186 N⋅m (127 or 137 lb⋅ft) (JP)	5-speed manual (S51); 4-speed automatic (A140E)
CV10	Diesel	1.8 L turbo I4	1C-TL	59 kW (80 PS) at 4,500 rpm (JP)	152 N⋅m (112 lb⋅ft) at 2,400 rpm (JP)	5-speed manual (S50); 4-speed automatic (A140L)
CV10	Diesel	1.8 L turbo I4	1C-TL	54 kW (73 PS) at 4,500 rpm (EU)	145 N⋅m (107 lb⋅ft) at 2,400 rpm (EU)	5-speed manual (S50); 4-speed automatic (A140L)
CV10	Diesel	1.8 L turbo I4	1C-TLC	54 kW (73 hp) at 4,500 rpm (NA)	141 N⋅m (104 lb⋅ft) at 2,400 rpm (NA)	5-speed manual (S50); 4-speed automatic (A140L)
CV11	Diesel	2.0 L turbo I4	2C-TL	65 kW (88 PS) at 4,500 rpm (JP)	167 N⋅m (123 lb⋅ft) at 2,400 rpm (JP)	5-speed manual (S50); 4-speed automatic (A140L)
CV11	Diesel	2.0 L turbo I4	2C-TLC	59 kW (79 hp) at 4,500 rpm (NA)	159 N⋅m (117 lb⋅ft) at 3,000 rpm (NA)	4-speed automatic (A140L)

=== V20 (1986–1992) ===
V20
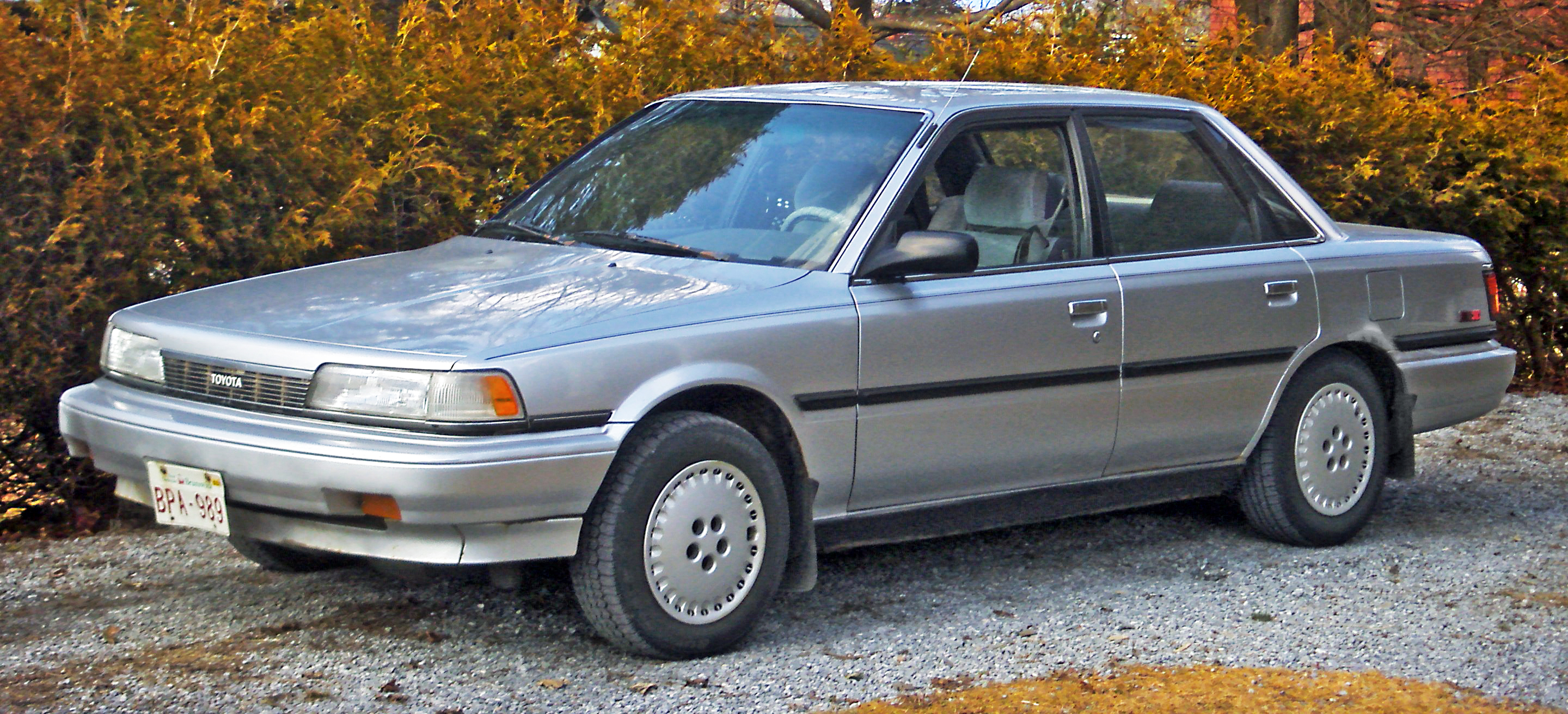
- Camry LE sedan (Canada; pre-facelift)

Overview
- Model code: V20
- Also called: Toyota Vista (Japan); Lexus ES 250; Holden Apollo (Australia, JV); Xinkai Camry (China, JV)
- Production: August 1986 – August 1991 (Japan); February 1987 – November 1992 (Australia); May 1988 – August 1991 (US)
- Model years: 1987–1991
- Assembly: Japan: Toyota, Aichi (Tsutsumi plant); Australia: Port Melbourne, Victoria; United States: Georgetown, Kentucky; China: Zhanjiang, Guangdong (Xinkai)
- Designer: Seiichi Yamauchi (1984)

Body and chassis
- Body style: 4-door sedan; 4-door hardtop sedan; 5-door station wagon
- Layout: Transverse front-engine, front-wheel-drive; Transverse front-engine, four-wheel-drive

Powertrain
- Engine: gasoline: 1,832 cc 1S-i I4; 1,838 cc 4S-Fi DOHC 16V I4; 1,998 cc 3S-FC, -FE DOHC 16V I4; 1,998 cc 3S-GE DOHC 16V I4; 1,992 cc 1VZ-FE DOHC 24V V6; 2,507 cc 2VZ-FE DOHC 24V V6; diesel: 1,974 cc 2C-T turbo I4
- Transmission: 5-speed manual; 4-speed automatic

Dimensions
- Wheelbase: 2,600 mm (102.4 in)
- Length: 4,500–4,520 mm (177.2–178.0 in) (sedan); 4,525 mm (178.1 in) (wagon)
- Width: 1,695 mm (66.7 in)
- Height: 1,385–1,395 mm (54.5–54.9 in) (sedan); 1,440 mm (56.7 in) (wagon)
- Curb weight: 1,080–1,295 kg (2,381–2,855 lb)

The second generation, V20 series Camry went on sale during August 1986 in Japan. As with the previous series, there was again a parallel Vista model for the home market that Toyota released simultaneously. V20 Camry and Vista sedans continued with the four-door sedan configuration. For overseas markets, Toyota issued a station wagon for the first time. The Vista also launched with a four-door pillared hardtop sedan with unique body panels all-round in lieu of the liftback offered with the previous car—a body extended to the Camry in August 1988. To attain a sportier appearance with lower and wider proportions, Toyota reduced the height of the hardtop by 25 mm (1 in) over the sedan. Not intended for export, this hardtop body with few changes would later form the basis of the upscale but hastily conceived Lexus ES 250 produced for North American customers from June 1989 through to 1991. Toyota rushed the ES 250 as a stopgap measure to flesh out the fledgling Lexus lineup so as not to launch the flagship LS 400 as a stand-alone model.

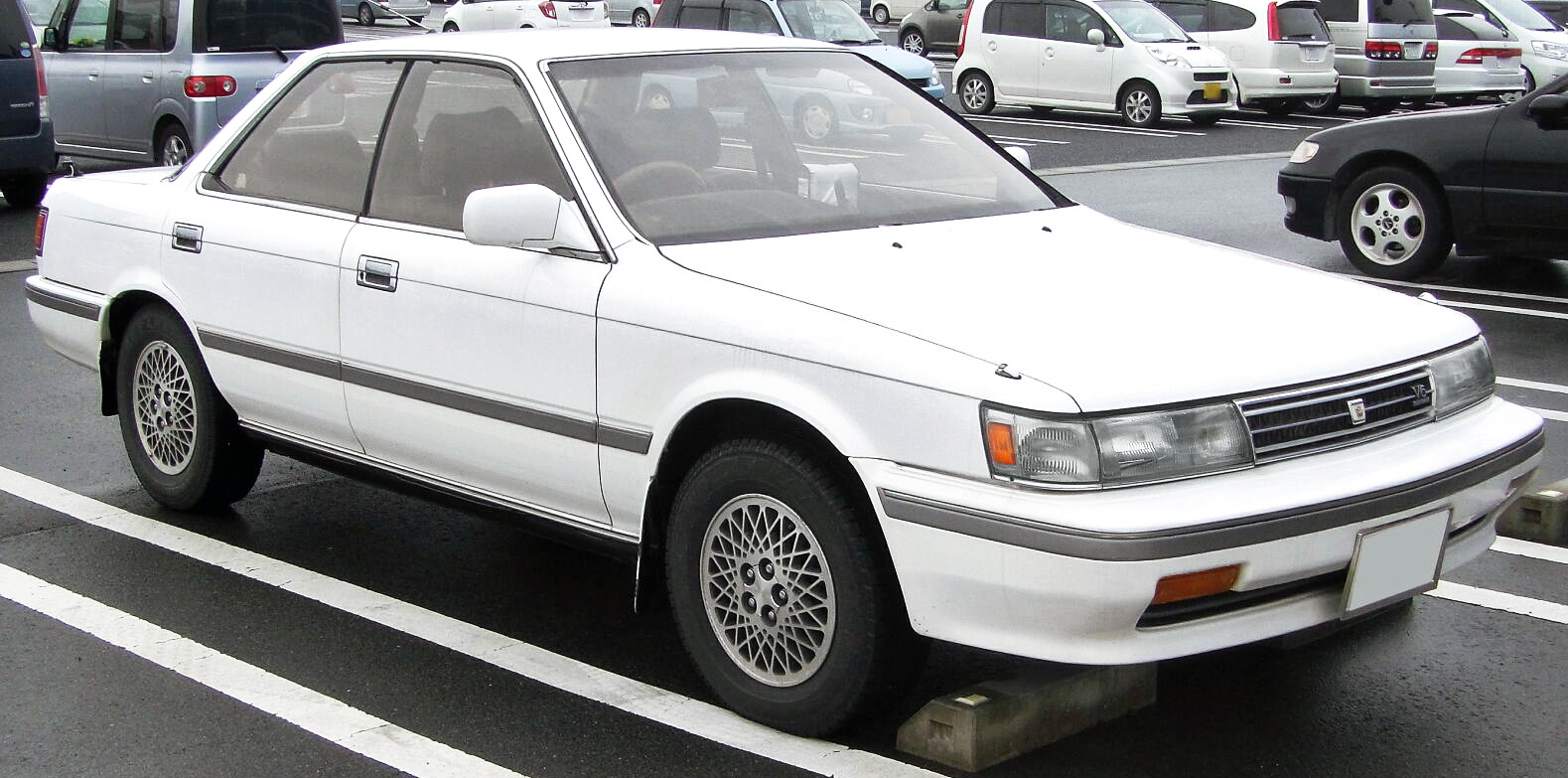
Camry Prominent hardtop (Japan)

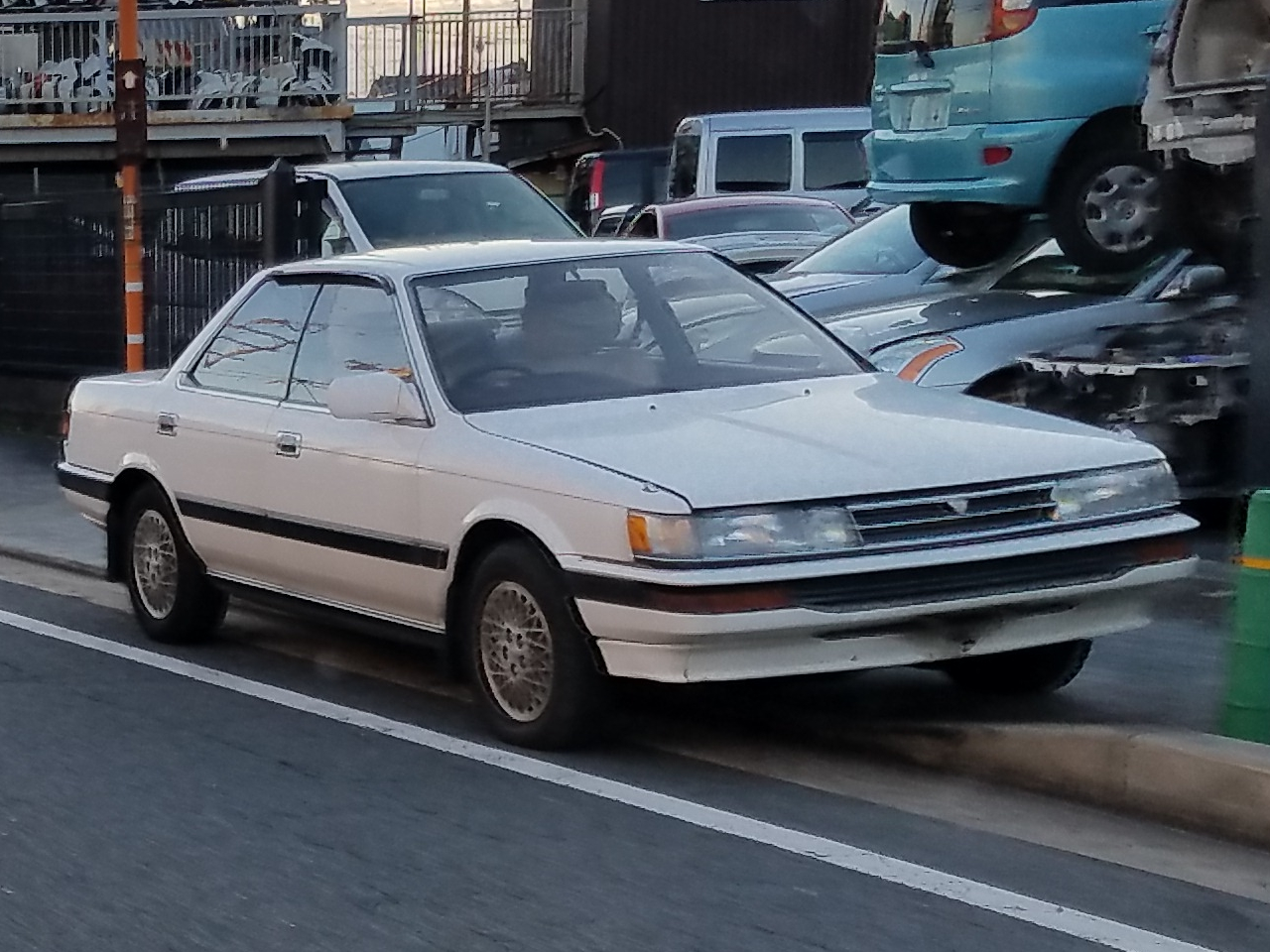
Vista 2.0 VX (Japan; pre-facelift)

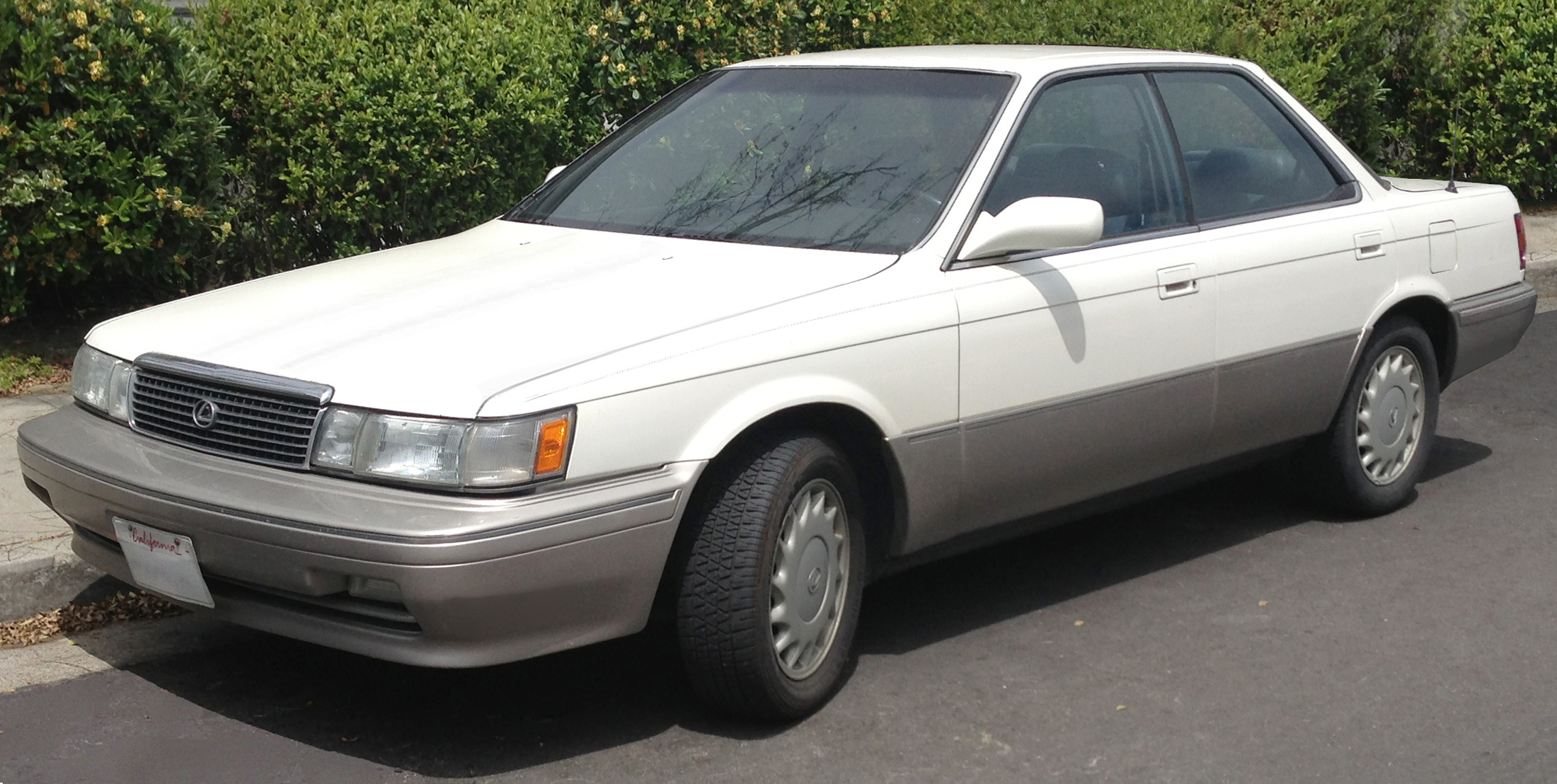
Lexus ES 250 (US; facelift)

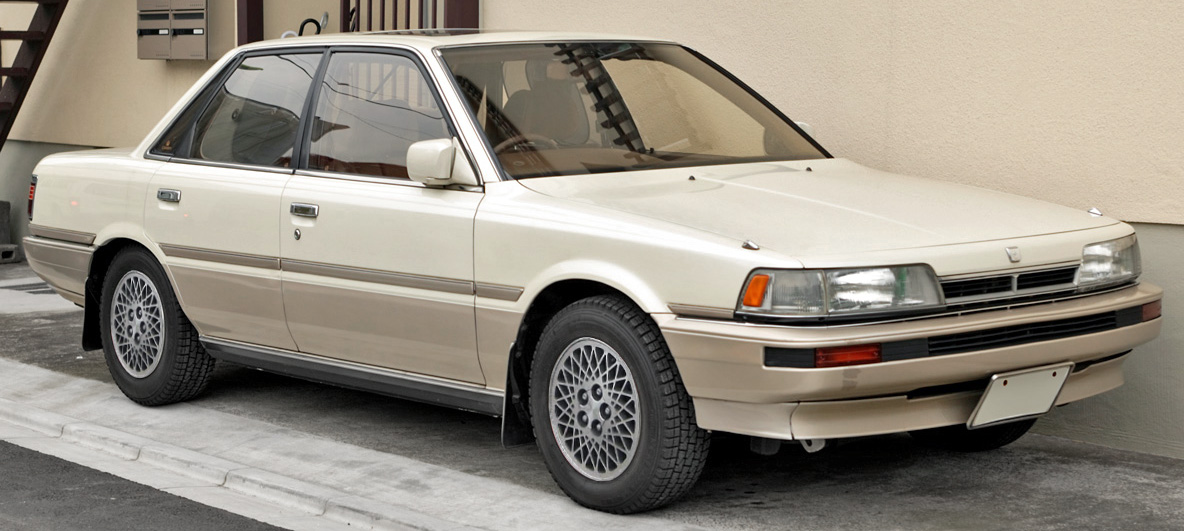
Camry ZX sedan (Japan; pre-facelift)

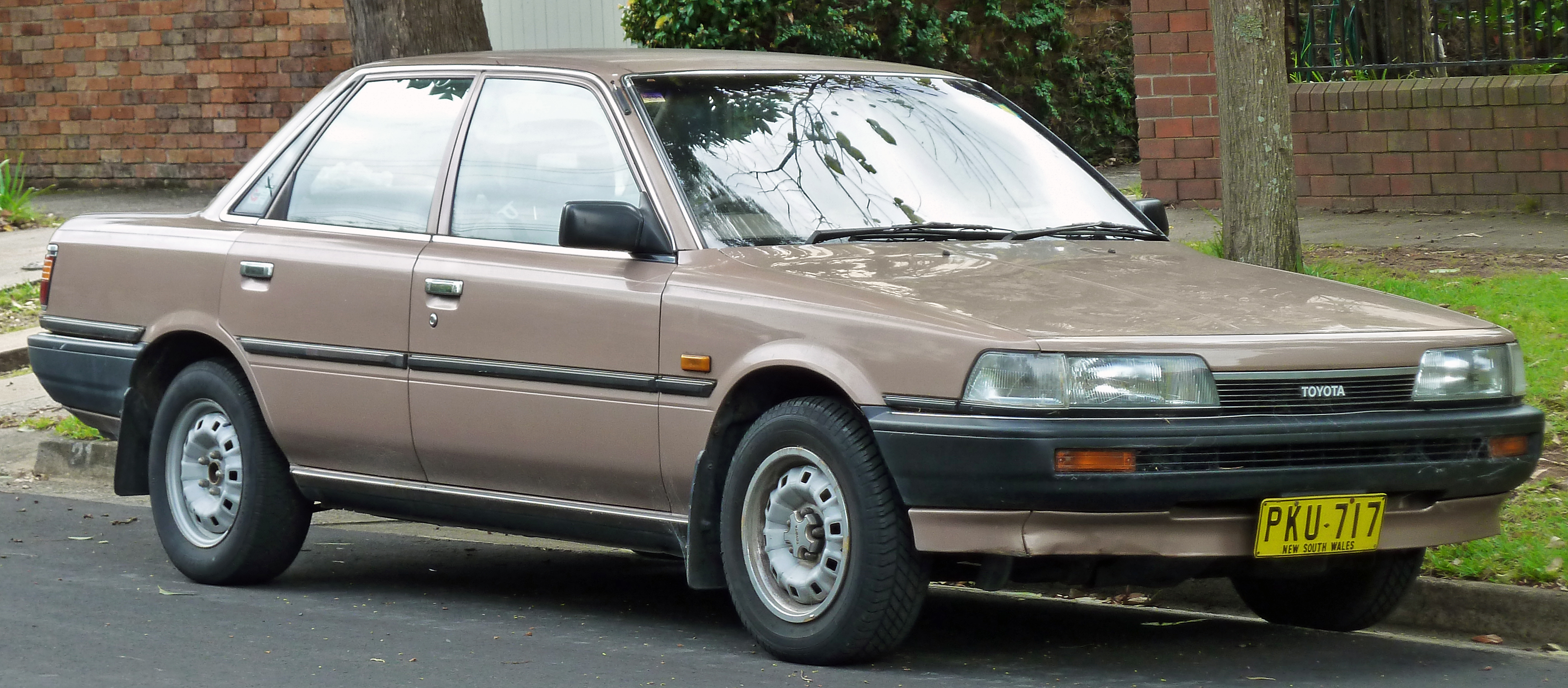
Camry CS sedan (Australia; pre-facelift)

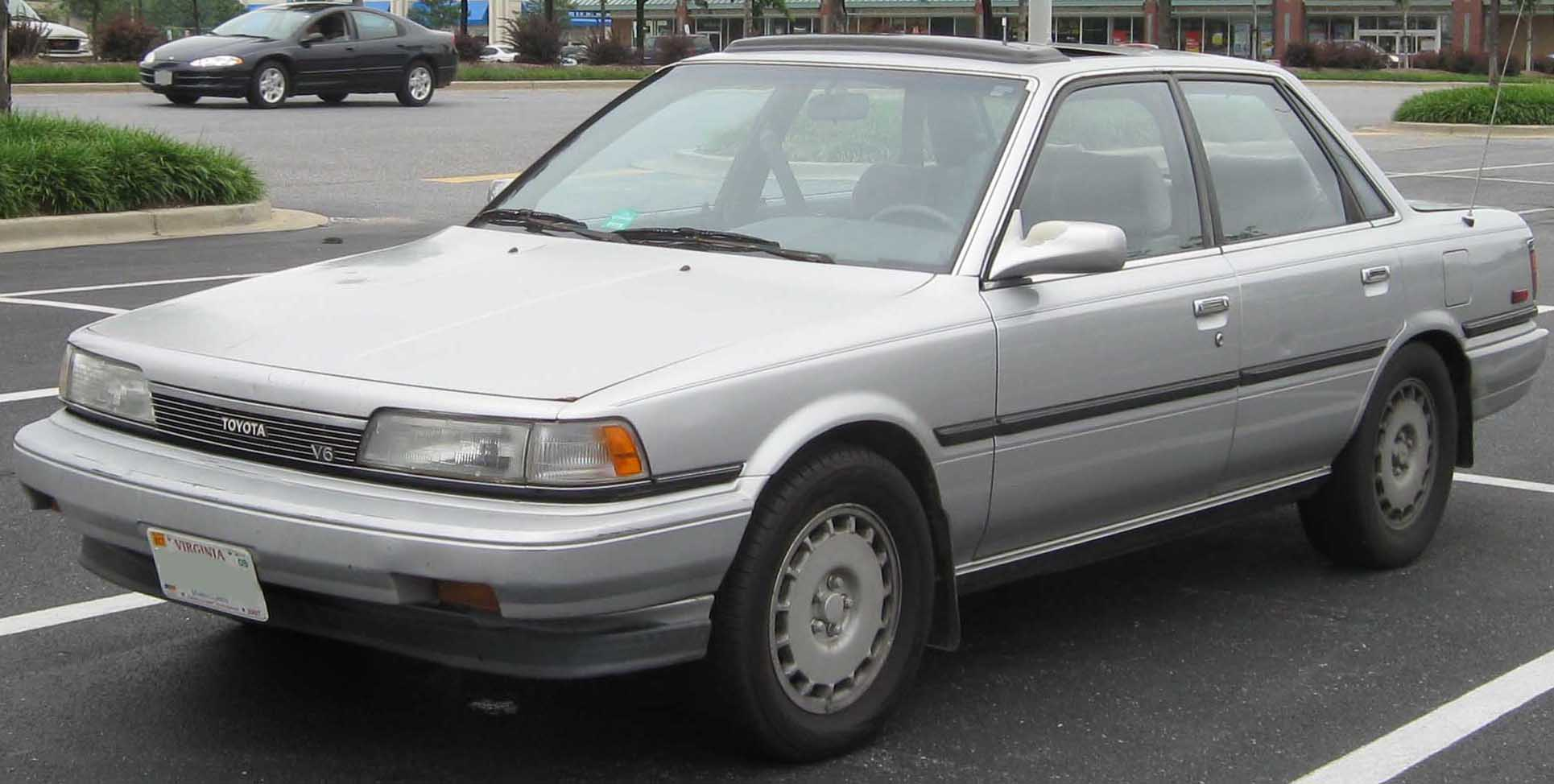
Camry LE V6 sedan (US; pre-facelift)

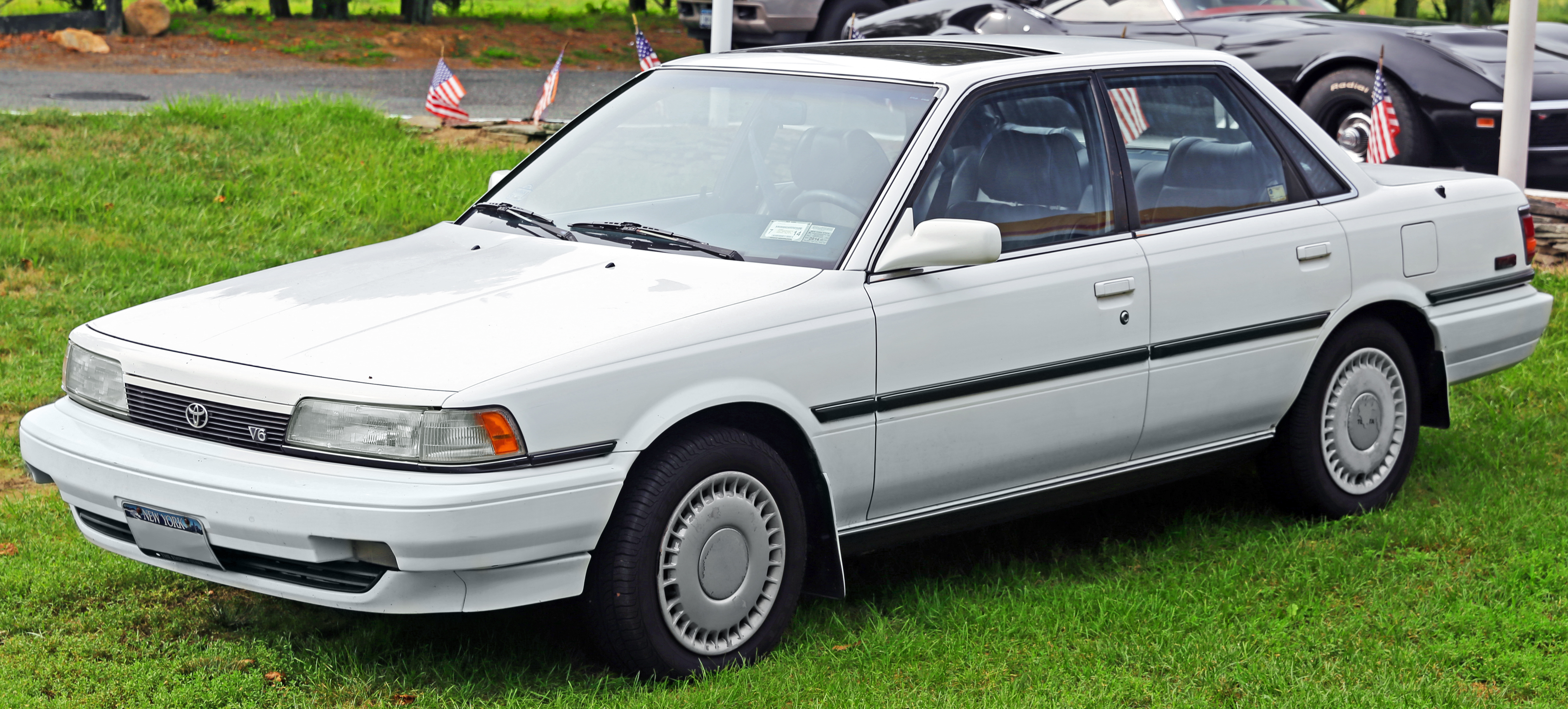
Camry LE V6 sedan (US; facelift)

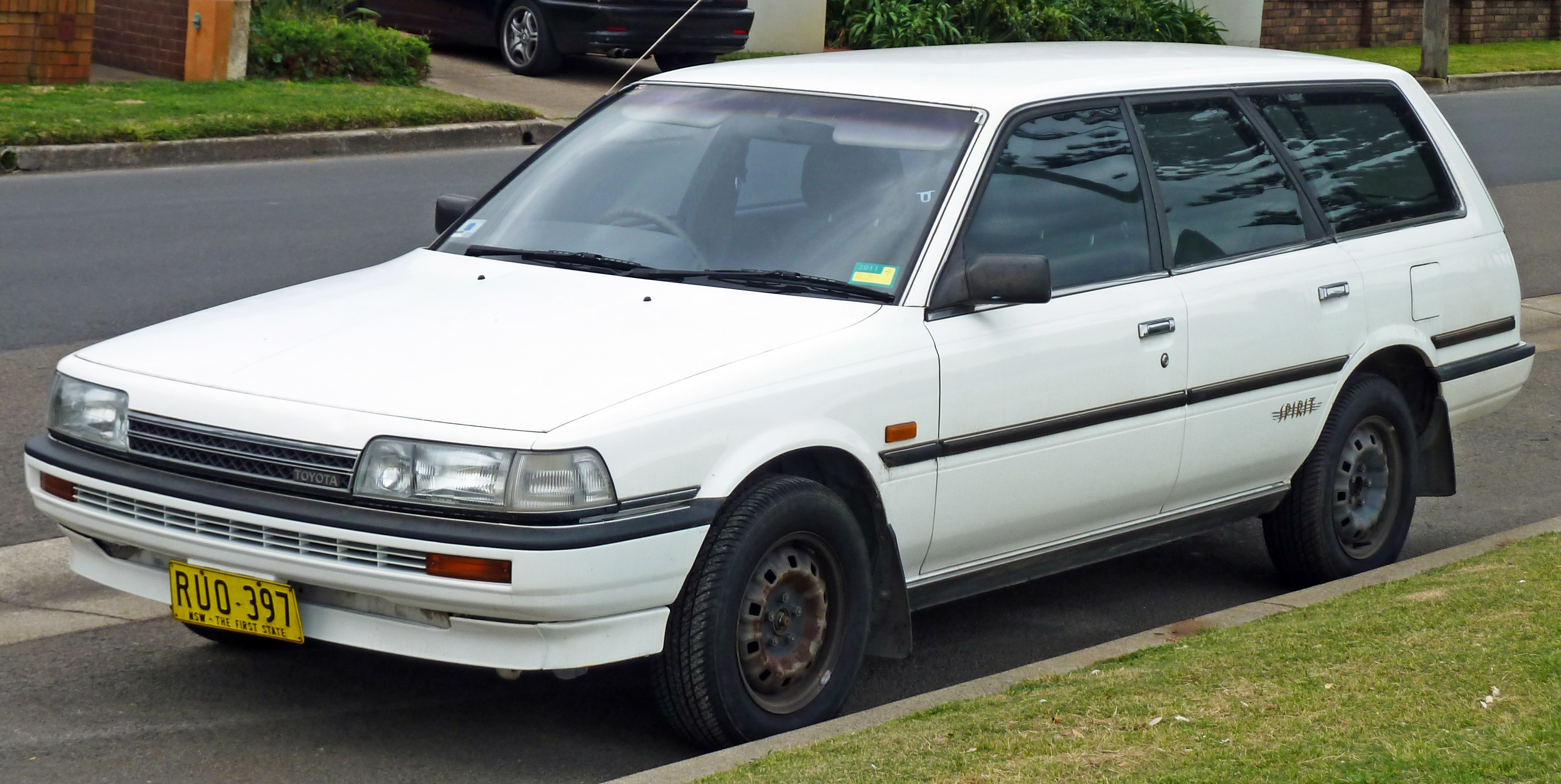
Camry Spirit wagon (Australia; first facelift)

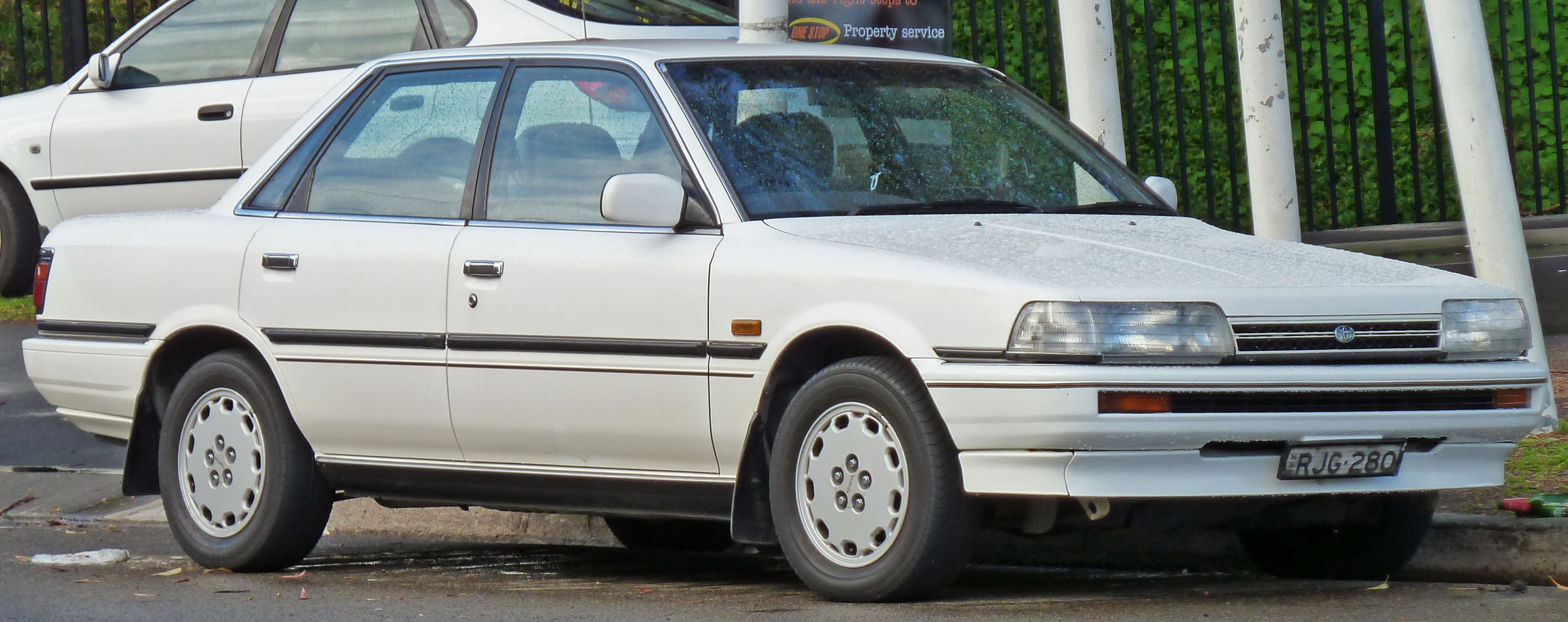
Camry Ultima sedan (Australia; second facelift)

The V20 Camry originated from a time at Toyota when considerable cost and attention to detail was engineered into its cars such as high-quality materials and build quality to transcend the competition. Sedans retained the V10's rear quarter glass with styling less angular than before. To appease export customers, styling lost some of its Japanese legacy in its transition to a more Americanized design, with a softer and sleeker silhouette. Toyota designed the body with aerodynamics in mind, with performance of Cd=0.34 for the sedan. V20 also features headlamps and a grille that are sculptured into a gently curved hood that partially conceal the windshield wipers, wind splitters up the ends of the windshield, near-flush glass, and a third door seal to close the gap between the body and window frames. Body dimensions were largely unchanged from the previous model, including an identical wheelbase, although length increases 100 mm (3.9 in). Basic sub-skin hardware is also closely related, including the platform and the fully independent suspension with a strut and a coil spring at each corner and an anti-roll bar at each end. Noise isolation is improved by mounting the rear suspension on a subframe akin to the Toyota Celica (T160) that had now switched to Camry-based mechanicals. As before, the braking package encompasses ventilated discs up front, conventional drums in the rear, upgraded to rear discs in some cars. The braking system has a tandem-type booster and diagonally divided hydraulic circuits. Wagons receive a load-sensing proportioning valve that grants greater braking pressure when laden and prevents wheel lockup under light payloads. Entry-level V20 wheel size increases from 13 to 14 inches.

All engines now use fuel injection exclusively and were common to Camry and Vista. Entry-level customers were offered the carry-over "Ci" 1.8-liter 1S-i (designated 1S-iLU in the V10) inline-four with five-speed manual or an automatic with four gears. Stepping up from this were the new 3S-FE and GT high-performance 3S-GE (designated 3S-GELU for V10s) 2.0-liter twin-cam four-cylinder cars. Turbo-diesel models were again limited to the 2C-T motor displacing 2.0 liters (labeled 2C-TL for V10s). Transmission were either a five-speed manual or an electronically controlled automatic with four gears. When launched in Japan, the V20 series Camry (sedan only) offered the following trim levels: LT, XT, XT Saloon, ZE, ZT, ZX, and GT.

For the Vista sedan, Toyota offered: VC, VL, VE, VR, and VX. Hardtop versions comprised: VE, VR, VX, and GT. Flagship models of the Japanese specification Camry sedan, the Camry Prominent and Prominent G arrived in April 1987 with the 2.0-liter 1VZ-FE V6 engine, a protruding chrome grille, larger North American-type bumpers, wood grain interior highlights, an electric seat function, plus electronic instrument cluster. All-Trac full-time four-wheel-drive became an option in October 1987 with select 3S-FE manual variants (VL Extra, VR); automatics equipped with an electronic front- and rear-wheel torque distribution optimizer followed in August 1988. The Vista was not available with the V6, but in April 1987, the special edition Vista VL Extra sedan and hardtop arrived, followed by the Etoile in August and again in January 1989; limited edition Etoile V cars were offered in September 1989 and January 1990. Toyota discontinued the Vista VC in December 1989 and released a special edition VX Limited in May 1989 and then again for January 1990.

When the Camry Prominent hardtop variant arrived in August 1988, it offered base, G, and E-Type levels of trim alongside a new sedan-only Camry Lumière. Also in August 1988, a diesel version of the Vista hardtop made its debut, and the 1.8-liter gasoline engine was upgraded to the twin-cam 4S-Fi specification. Special editions for the Camry comprised: Lumière S sedan (January 1989), Prominent X hardtop (May 1989), Lumière G sedan (June 1989), and XT Saloon Special sedan (January 1990).

North American market V20 series Camry sedan and wagons came to the market in late 1986 for the 1987 model year. Toyota Motor Manufacturing Kentucky, the first wholly owned Toyota plant in the US, began producing the Camry in May 1988. The country of manufacture can be found by looking at the first character of the VIN; a Camry manufactured in Japan has a VIN starting with "J", a model made in the US starts with "4". All Camry station wagons for the United States originated from Japan, while sedans were a mix of Japanese built and American built, with the ratio of American-built sedans increasing yearly. Three trim levels of the V20 Camry were made: the unbadged base model, the DX, and the LE. The four-wheel-drive Camry, dubbed All-Trac was introduced for 1988 and a 2.5-liter V6 engine was also added as an option, though notably not in combination with the All-Trac option. The V6 was fuel-injected with 24 valves, and dual overhead camshafts. The 1989 model year saw the Camry's mid-life update which included new front and rear bumper covers that were one piece instead of two, new taillight design, along with a few interior styling updates. The 1990 model year saw a slight upgrade in horsepower for V6 models, from 153 to 156. North American 1990 Camrys built from February 1990-August 1990 also saw another refresh that included Toyota's new logo introduced that year onto the front grille. Color-keyed door handles and grille also appeared on DX and LE models, along with a new ignition chime. In 1989, anti-lock brakes became optional on the LE V6 sedan and wagon, and LE All-Trac.

1991 model year Camrys began production in August 1990, and can be identified by a newly redesigned front valence panel under the front bumper. In addition, the DX model gains new standard color keyed bumpers, new interior cloth that replaces the older tweed, and new hubcap designs on both DX and LE models.

Toyota Australia released the second generation Camry in April 1987. Local manufacture of the V20 had begun earlier in February at its recently acquired Australian Motor Industries facility at Port Melbourne, Victoria as a replacement for the Toyota Corona (T140) and the Camry before it. Four-cylinder engine production and panel-stamping was undertaken at the Toyota Australia Altona Plant all part of a model localization and factory upgrades investment totaling A$115 million. In fact, it was the first Camry made outside Japan, and is notable for being the most localized Toyota Australia product thus far with a lead time of less than six months, the shortest yet between start of Japanese and Australian manufacture. Higher levels of specification were fitted with the locally built 2.0-liter 3S-FE motor, but the imported 1.8-liter 1S-i unit distinguished base SE and CS cars. Both sedans and wagons were offered and either engine offered standard five-speed manual transmission, upgradeable to the four-speed automatic. Features standard at the base level SE comprised: AM/FM radio, center console storage compartment, remote fuel filler release, intermittent windshield wipers, digital clock. CS cars added a tilt steering column to which the CS-X adds a key lock warning system. The CS driver's seat has front height adjustment; the CS-X's front and rear height adjustment. The CS gets a two speaker AM/FM radio cassette player; the CS-X a four-speaker system and automatic electric antenna, plus central locking, variable intermittent wipers and center rear arm rest. The sedan-only Ultima grade gains power windows, cruise control, automatic transmission as standard, velour trim, and a nine-stage graphic equalizer for the audio system. A fleet-focused Executive pack based on the SE arrived in May 1988, adding automatic transmission, power steering, and air conditioning. In June 1988, the 2.5-liter V6 was introduced, being an imported fully optioned model from Japan sold in limited numbers and distinguished from local four-cylinder cars by its unique bumpers and trim. Also, the VIN of a model made in Australia starts with "6". Coinciding with the August 1989 facelift, the 2.0-liter 3S-FC engine with carburetor superseded the imported 1.8. The updates brought minor adjustments inside and out, including improved suspension, steering, and headlights. In May 1991, Toyota made the fuel-injected 3S-FE version standard upon the carbureted engine's deletion, and the CS trim level became CSi. Coinciding with this change, power steering became standard fitment and Toyota Australia refreshed badging, including the attachment of the new corporate logo consisting of three overlapping ellipses to form the letter "T". With the May 1991 update, the Ultima models gained a CD player, the first Australian-built car to offer this. Towards the end of the series, special editions were released, starting with the Spirit of February 1991. Then in September 1992, value-added CSi Limited and Olympic Spirit cars came onto the scene. Australian production ended in late November 1992, in time for production of the XV10 to commence on 2 December. The Used Car Safety Ratings, published in 2008 by the Monash University Accident Research Centre, found that V20 Camry models provide an "average" (3/5 stars) level of occupant safety protection in the event of an accident.

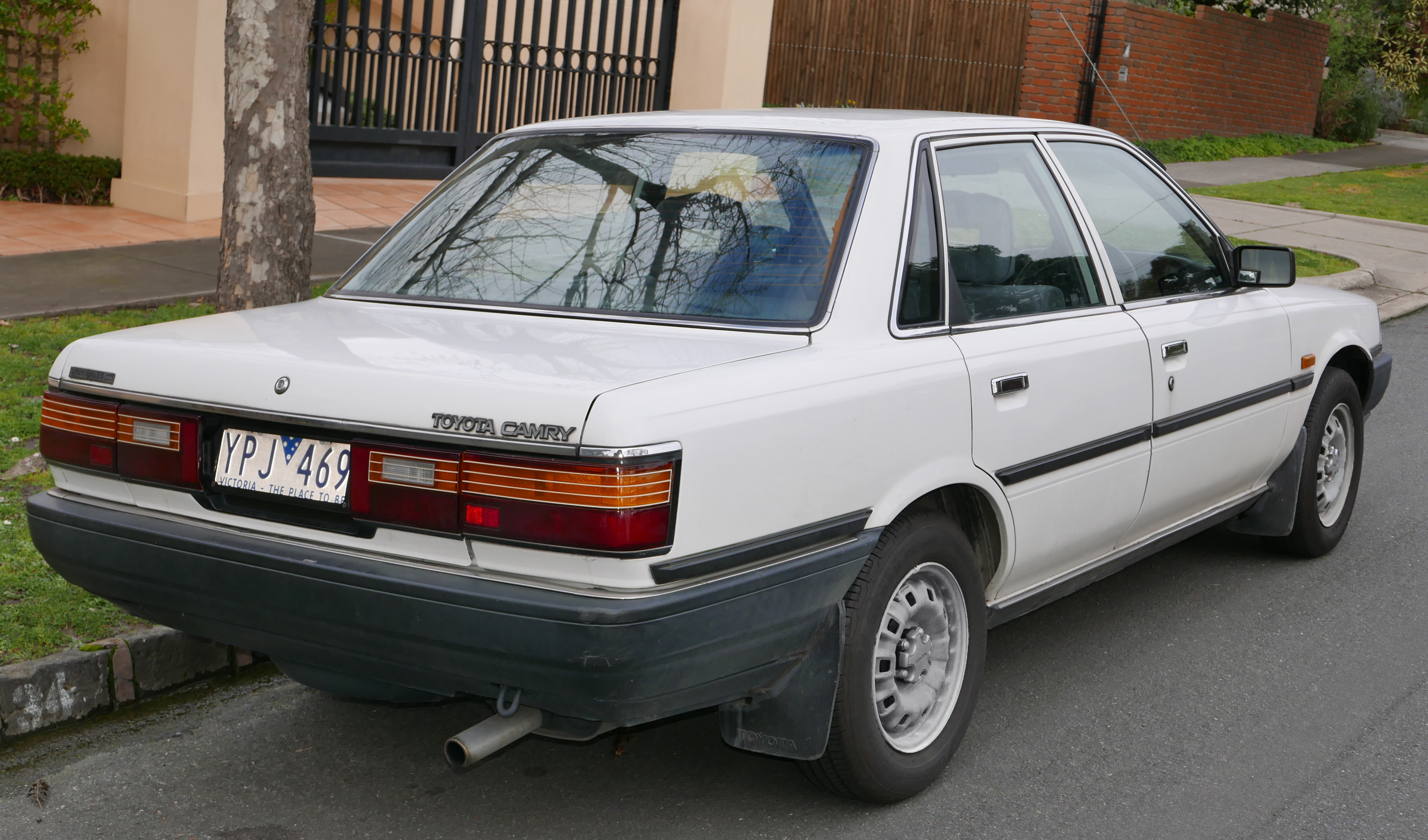
Camry Executive sedan (Australia; pre-facelift)

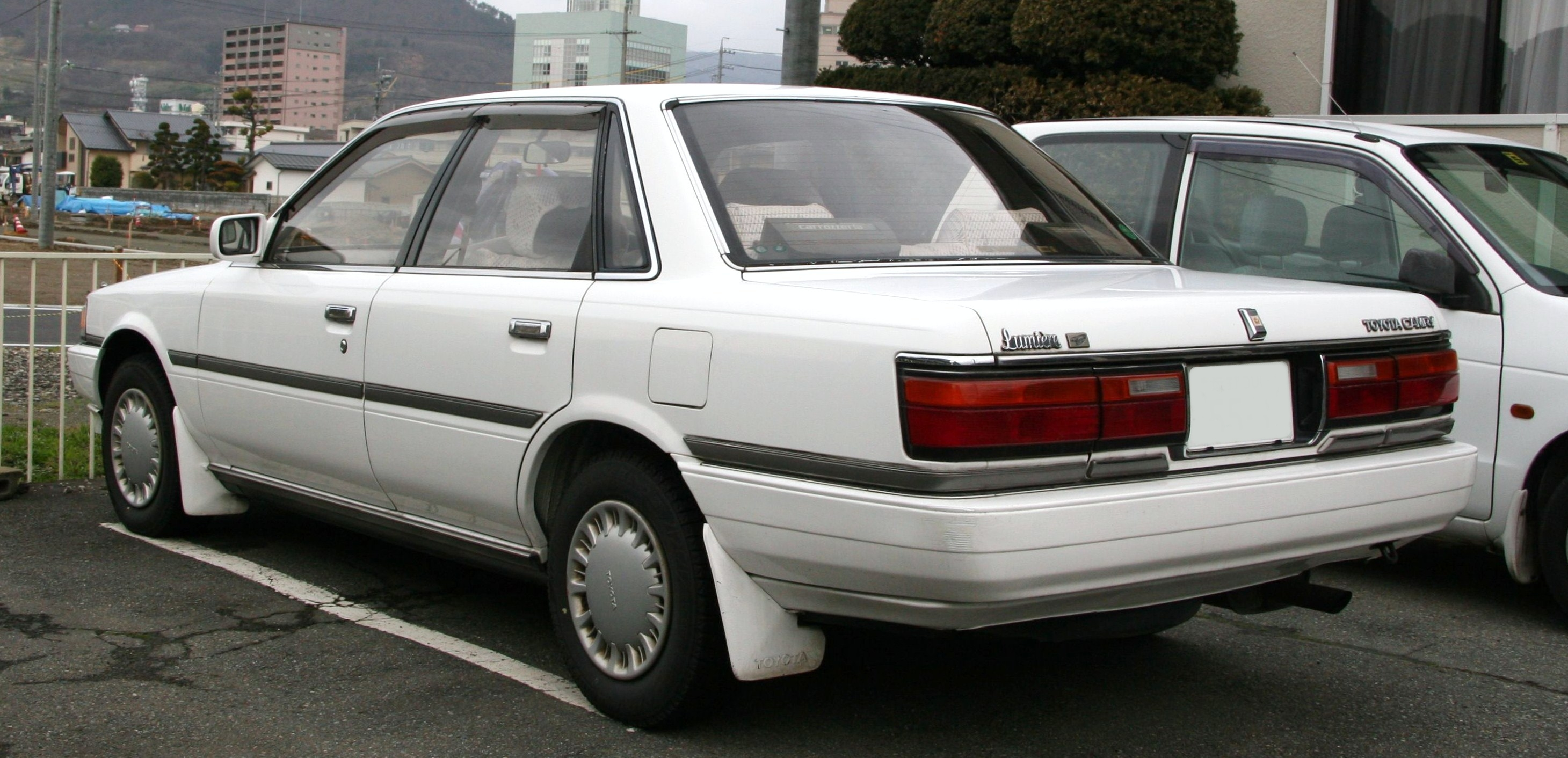
Camry Lumière sedan (Japan; facelift)

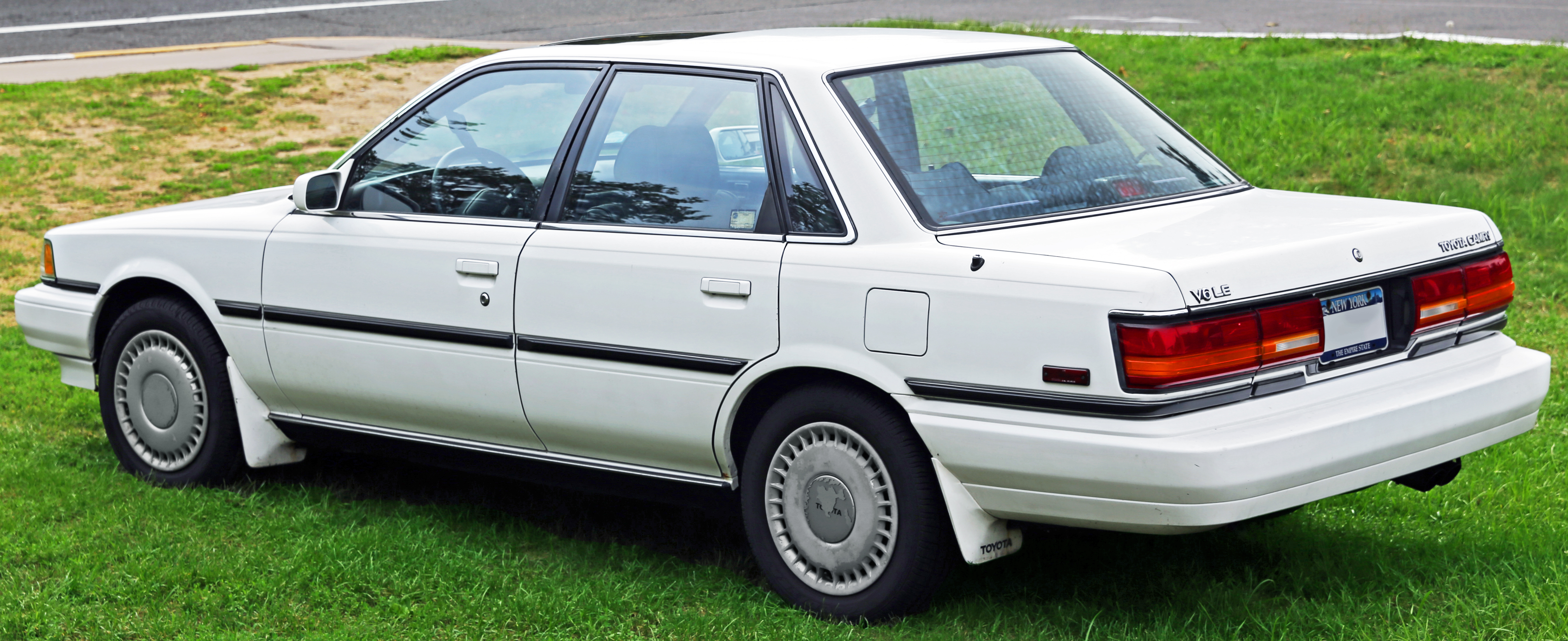
Camry LE V6 sedan (US; facelift)

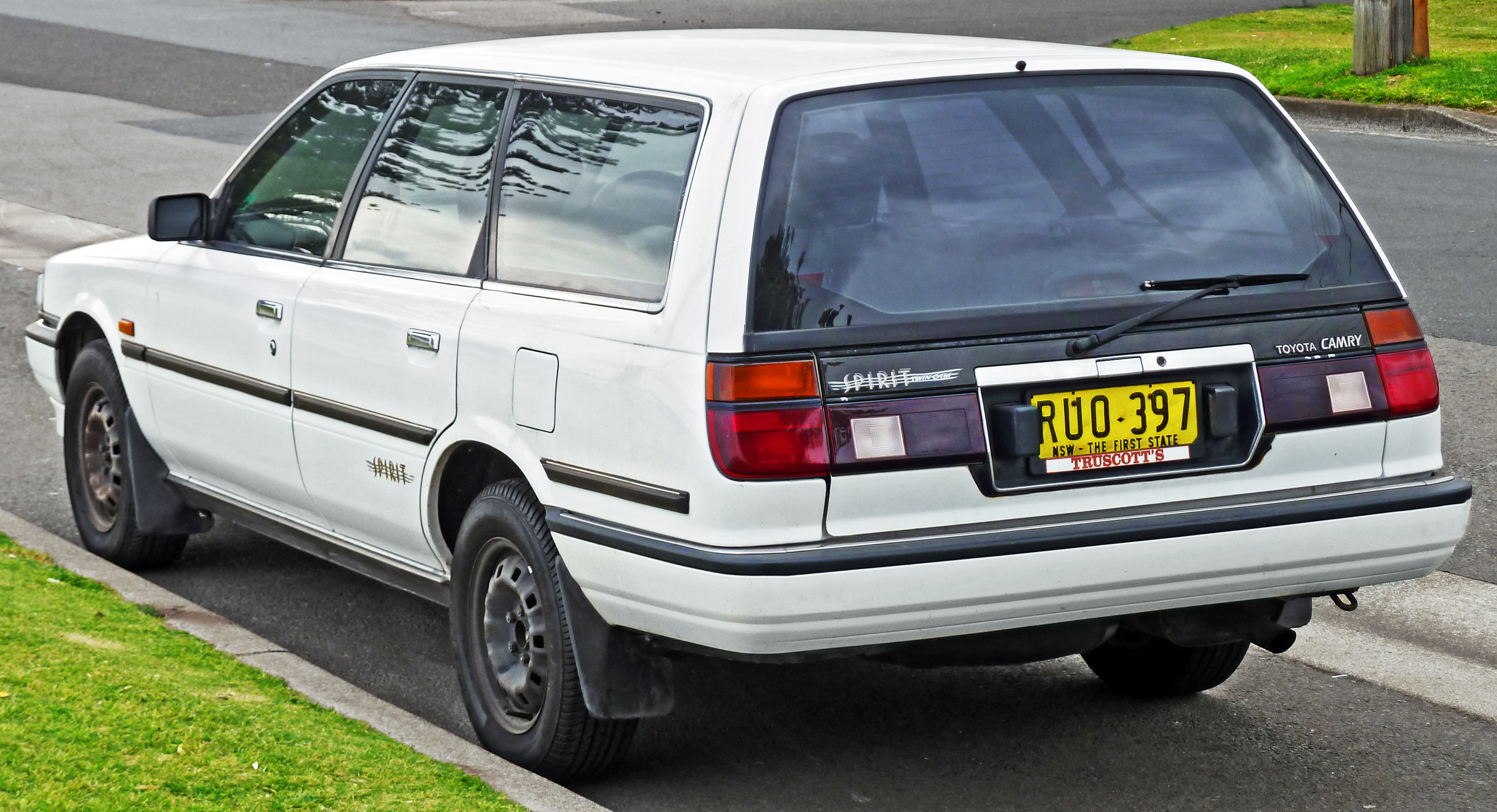
Camry Spirit wagon (Australia; first facelift)

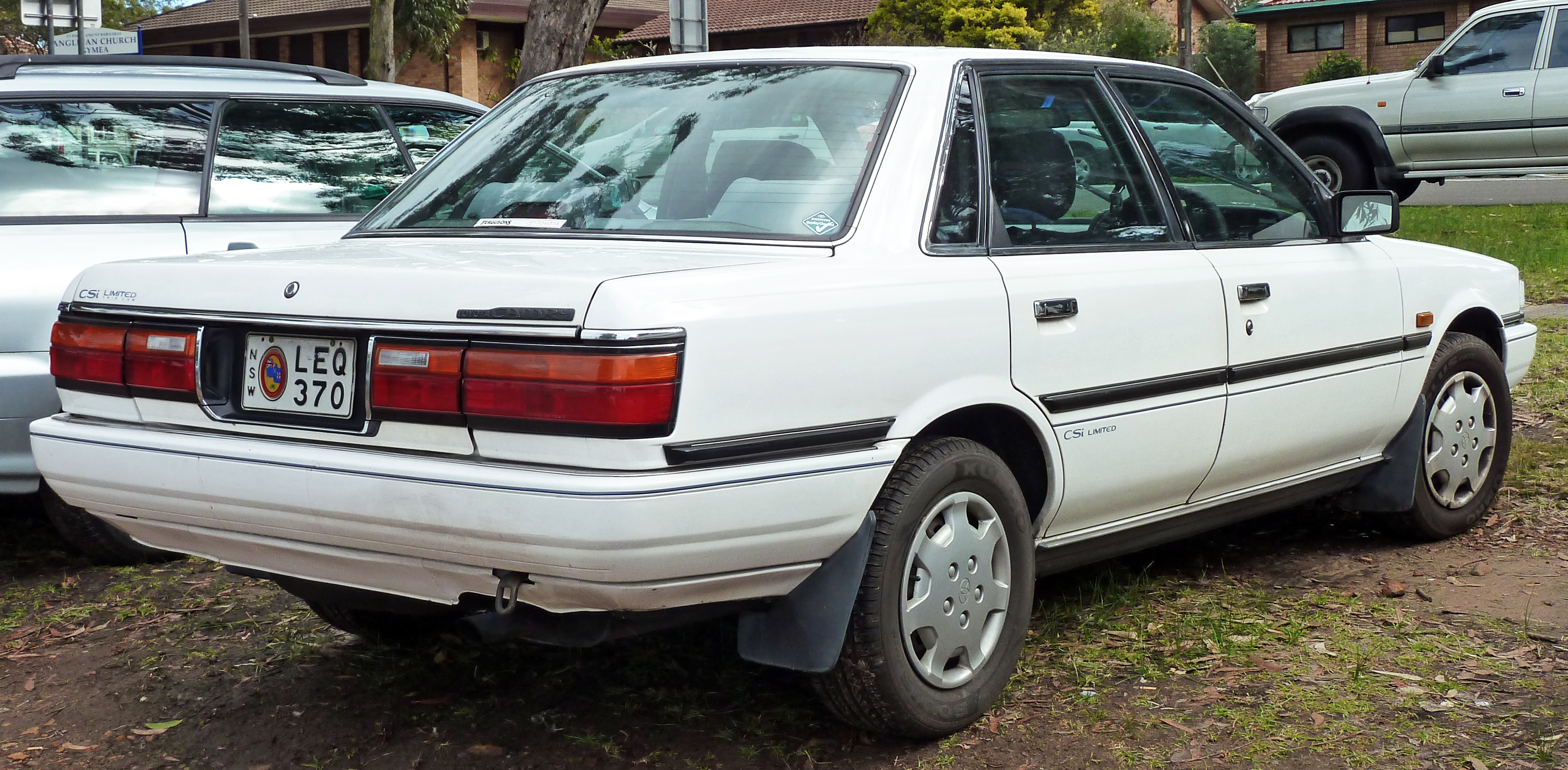
Camry CSi Limited sedan (Australia; second facelift)

Holden Apollo (JK, JL)

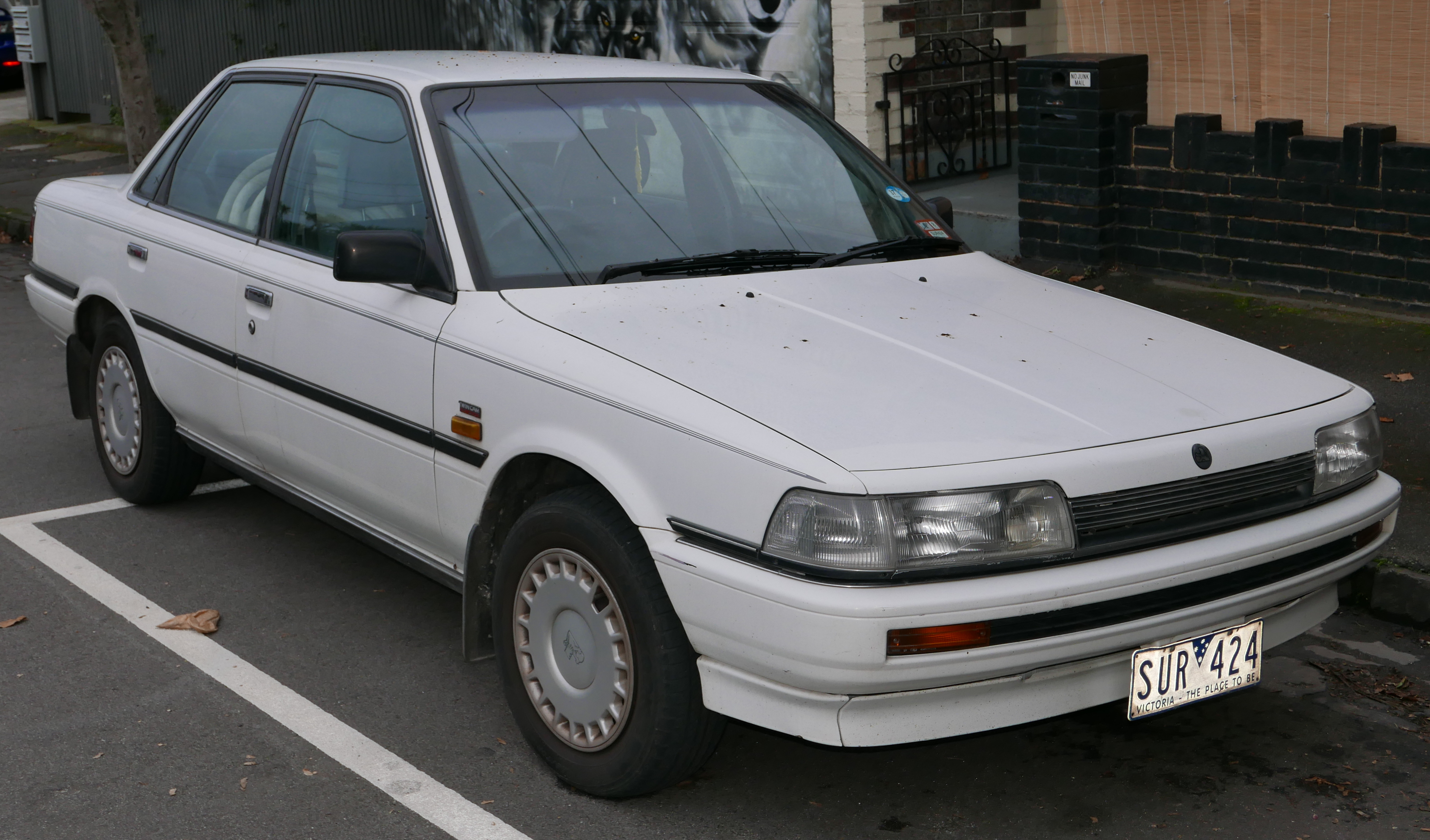
Holden Apollo (JK) SLE sedan

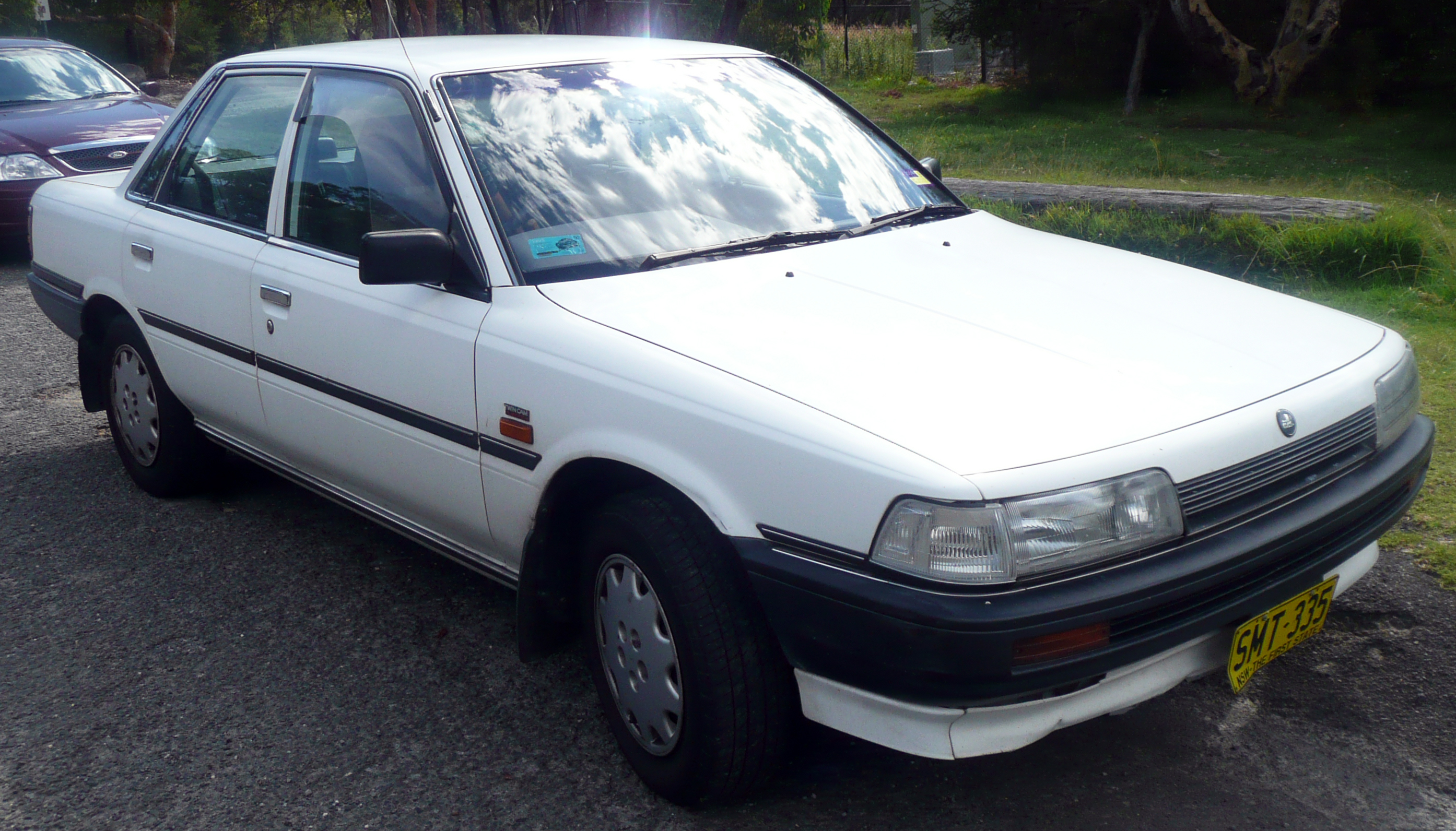
Holden Apollo (JL) SLX sedan

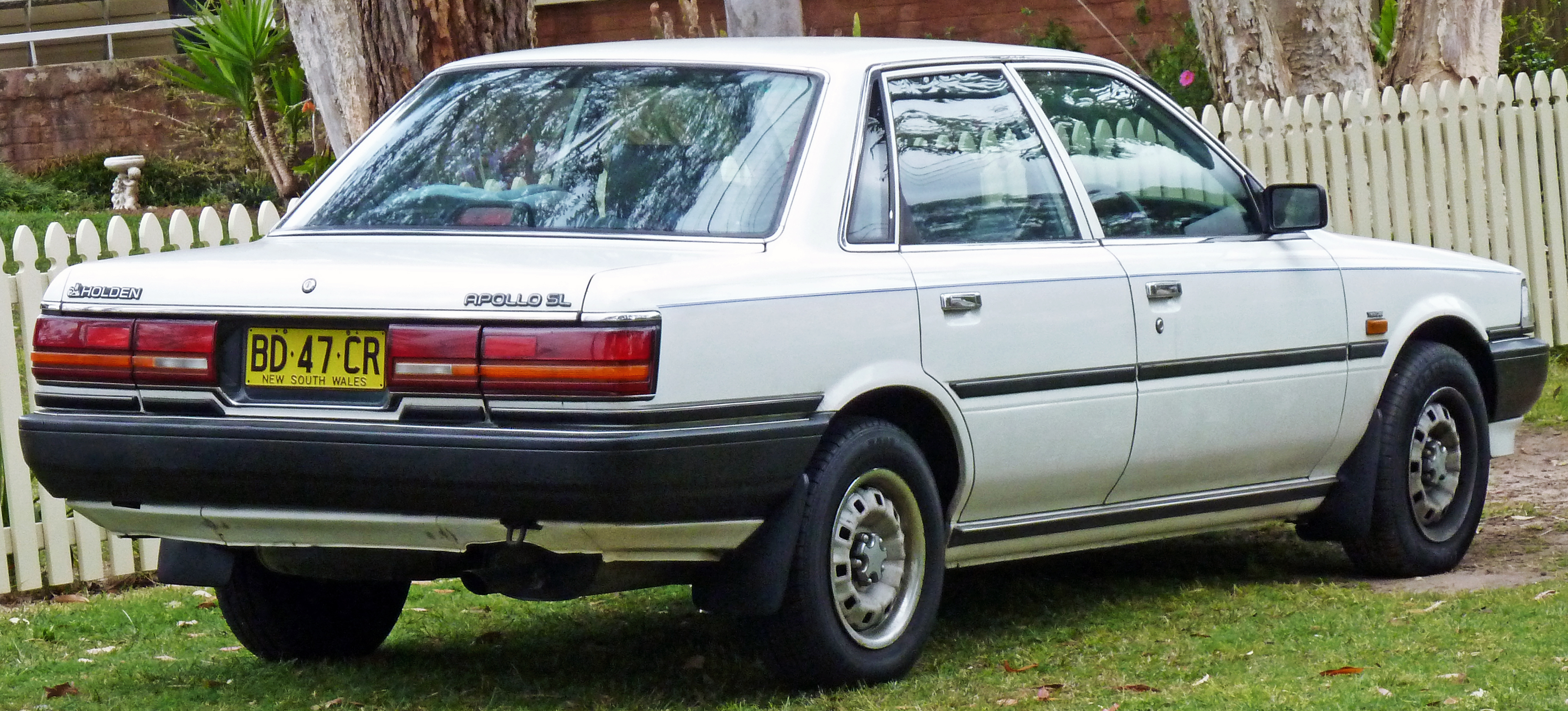
Holden Apollo (JK) SL sedan

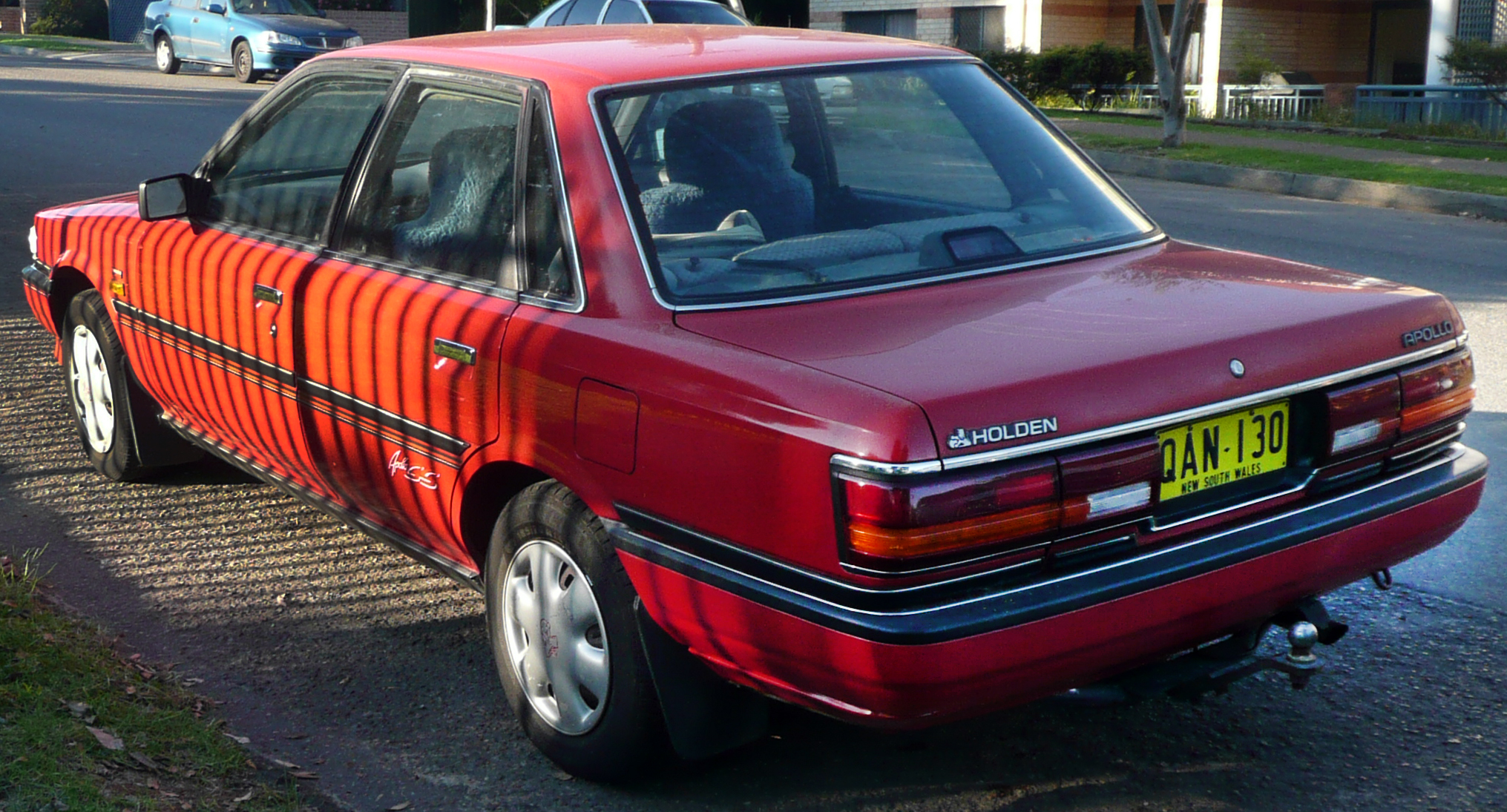
Holden Apollo (JL) GS sedan

The Holden Apollo, a rebadged variant to the Toyota Camry, retailed in Australia alongside the facelifted Camry V20 series from August 1989. Production had started in July. This model sharing occurred due to the United Australian Automobile Industries (UAAI) joint venture between Toyota Australia and General Motors-Holden's starting in 1987 that resulted in model sharing between both automakers from August 1989. Known as the JK series, the Apollo differentiated itself by way of a redesigned grille, rehashed tail lamps and other minor trim items. This rebranding scheme was the result of the Button car plan, introduced in May 1984 to rationalise and make the Australian automotive industry more competitive on a global scale by means of reducing import tariffs. Offered in sedan and wagon guises, Apollo replaced the Camira.

Powertrains were verbatim of the Camry, with the 3S-FC for the entry-level SL, and higher-end SLX and SLE models graced with the 3S-FE engine. An SLX option pack, known as the Executive was also available. The SL opened up the Apollo range with remote exterior mirrors, intermittent windshield wipers, heated rear screen demister, remote trunk release for sedans and fuel filler door, a two-speaker radio cassette player and tinted side and rear glass. SLX variants were distinguished by their full wheel covers, as opposed to the SL model's steel wheels with center caps. The Executive variant was not a stand-alone model, but an option pack for the SLX, adding power steering and automatic transmission. SLE equipment included the four-wheel disc brakes, variable intermittent windshield wipers, a four-speaker stereo, body-colored bumpers, dual odometers, automatic headlamp cut-off system, velour seat upholstery, center back-seat armrest, power antenna, central locking with illuminated driver's door lock and front map lamps. As per the Camry, in May 1991, the EFI version of the engine was made standard.

In August 1991, there was a small Apollo facelift, given the designation JL, with an altered model range. The SL and SLX continued, with the SLE now available only as a sedan. The Executive pack was now no longer offered, and a sports version, dubbed GS was introduced in both body variants. Equipment levels mostly mirrored the previous JK, although the SLX was now similar in specification to the discontinued Executive and the GS to the JK SLE, albeit without standard automatic transmission. GS specification cars also added body stripes, red highlights, a tachometer and upgraded audio. Appearance-wise, the JK and JL are very similar, with the JL's grille treated with bolder chrome highlighting and slightly altered tail lamps on sedans. The XV10 Camry-based JM Apollo replaced the JL in March 1993.

==== Model codes ====
Powertrains (V20)
Model	Drive	Fuel	Engine	Power	Torque	Transmission
SV20	FWD	Gasoline	1.8 L I4 (1S-i)	63 kW (85 PS) at 5,200 rpm (JP); 64 kW (86 hp) (AU)	142 N⋅m (105 lb⋅ft) at 3,000 rpm (JP); 145 N⋅m (107 lb⋅ft) (AU)	5-speed manual 4-speed automatic (A140E)
SV22	FWD	Gasoline	1.8 L I4 (4S-Fi)	77 kW (105 PS) (JP)	149 N⋅m (110 lb⋅ft) (JP)	5-speed manual 4-speed automatic (A140E)
SV21	FWD	Gasoline	2.0 L I4 (3S-FC)	82 kW (110 hp) (AU)	166 N⋅m (122 lb⋅ft) (AU)	5-speed manual 4-speed automatic (A140E)
SV21	FWD	Gasoline	2.0 L I4 (3S-GE)	103 kW (140 PS) at 6,200 rpm (JP)	172 N⋅m (127 lb⋅ft) at 4,800 rpm (JP)	5-speed manual 4-speed automatic (A140E)
SV21	FWD	Gasoline	2.0 L I4 (3S-FE)	88 kW (120 PS) at 5,600 rpm (JP); 88 kW (118 hp) (AU); 86 kW (115 hp) at 5,200 rpm (NA)	169 N⋅m (124 lb⋅ft) at 4,400 rpm (JP); 171 N⋅m (126 lb⋅ft) (AU); 168 N⋅m (124 lb⋅ft) at 4,400 rpm (NA)	5-speed manual (S51, S53); 4-speed automatic (A140E)
SV25	4WD	Gasoline	2.0 L I4 (3S-FE)	88 kW (120 PS) at 5,600 rpm (JP); 88 kW (118 hp) (AU); 86 kW (115 hp) at 5,200 rpm (NA)	169 N⋅m (124 lb⋅ft) at 4,400 rpm (JP); 171 N⋅m (126 lb⋅ft) (AU); 168 N⋅m (124 lb⋅ft) at 4,400 rpm (NA)	5-speed manual (E56F5); 4-speed automatic (A540H)
VZV20	FWD	Gasoline	2.0 L V6 (1VZ-FE)	103 kW (140 PS) at 6,000 rpm (JP)	174 N⋅m (128 lb⋅ft) at 4,600 rpm (JP)	5-speed manual (E53); 4-speed automatic (A540E)
VZV21	FWD	Gasoline	2.5 L V6 (2VZ-FE)	117 kW (157 hp) (AU); 1987–1989: 114 kW (153 hp) at 5,600 rpm (NA); 1990–1991: 116 kW (156 hp) at 5,600 rpm (NA)	215 N⋅m (159 lb⋅ft) (AU); 1987–1989: 210 N⋅m (155 lb⋅ft) at 4,400 rpm (NA); 1990–1991: 217 N⋅m (160 lb⋅ft) at 4,400 rpm (NA)	5-speed manual (E52); 4-speed automatic (A540E)
CV20	FWD	Diesel	2.0 L I4-T (2C-T)	60 kW (82 PS) at 4,500 rpm (JP)	160 N⋅m (118 lb⋅ft) at 2,400 rpm (JP)	5-speed manual (S50); 4-speed automatic (A140L)

=== V30 (1990–1994) ===
V30
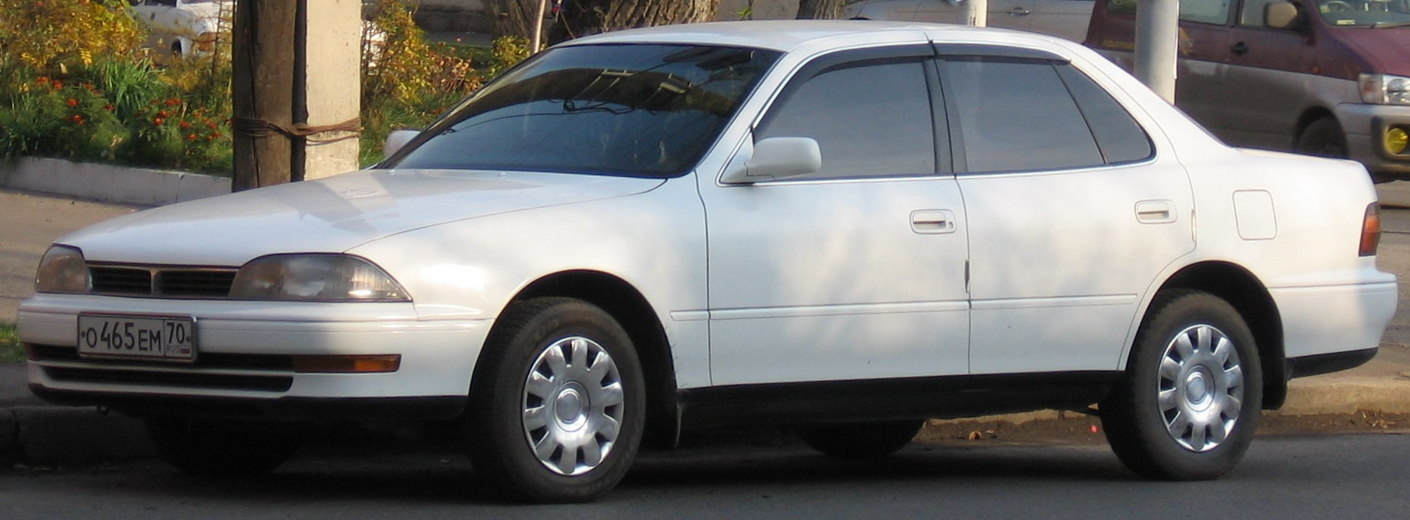
- 1990 Toyota Camry sedan (Japan, pre-facelift)

Overview
- Model code: V30
- Also called: Toyota Vista (Japan)
- Production: July 1990 – June 1994
- Assembly: Japan: Toyota, Aichi (Tsutsumi plant)
- Designer: Osamu Shikado (1988)

Body and chassis
- Body style: 4-door sedan; 4-door hardtop sedan
- Layout: Transverse front-engine, front-wheel-drive; Transverse front-engine, four-wheel-drive
- Related: Toyota Camry (XV10); Toyota Windom (XV10); Lexus ES 300 (XV10)

Powertrain
- Engine: gasoline: 1,838 cc 4S-FE I4; 1,998 cc 3S-FE I4; 1,998 cc 3S-GE I4; 1,992 cc 1VZ-FE V6; 2,496 cc 4VZ-FE V6; diesel: 1,974 cc 2C-T turbo I4
- Transmission: 5-speed manual; 4-speed automatic

Dimensions
- Wheelbase: 2,600 mm (102.4 in)
- Length: 4,600 mm (181.1 in) (sedan); 4,630–4,670 mm (182.3–183.9 in) (hardtop)
- Width: 1,695 mm (66.7 in)
- Height: 1,395 mm (54.9 in) (sedan); 1,380 mm (54.3 in) (hardtop)
- Curb weight: 1,180–1,360 kg (2,600–3,000 lb)

Introduced exclusively to Japan in July 1990, the Camry V30 carried forward the four-door sedan and a differently styled hardtop sedan. Like before, either shape could be had in a Vista branded variety with revised styling. Both bodies would also form the basis of enlarged wide-body XV10 versions from September 1991, aimed primarily at international markets. The V30 remained smaller than the XV10 to offer buyers a vehicle within the "five-number" registration category concerning exterior dimensions and engine displacement for Japanese vehicle size regulations. The rules required a body width under 1.7 m (5.6 ft), length under 4.7 m (15.4 ft), and engines at or below 2,000 cc. Sedans in the wide-body format would sell overseas as the Camry XV10—identical to the smaller V30 in most respects except for the front- and rear-end styling grafted to an otherwise unchanged body and interior. Hardtop sedans would engender the luxury Lexus ES 300 (XV10), which again would couple the existing side profile with rehashed front, rear, and interior designs. The export-oriented ES 300 would sell as the Toyota Windom in Japan.

Dimensions grew slightly with sedan body length extended to 4,600 mm (181.1 in), and for the Vista and Camry hardtops to 4,630 and 4,670 mm (182.3 and 183.9 in), respectively. Penned by Osamu Shikado, the V30's design is much rounder when compared to the V20 series. Rather than the V20's six-window greenhouse, the V30 sedans have a four-part setup with integrated window sashes. Up front, the sedan's curved headlamps converge with a slimline grille insert; hardtops get a thinner front assembly with narrower lights, and the C-pillar is raked more sharply. Base cars gain full body-color coding of peripheral exterior components.

The four-wheel strut/coil suspension carried over from the V20, although as option on high-end front-drive trims, Toyota added a wheel-stroke-sensitive Toyota Electronic Modulated Suspension (TEMS) and speed sensitive four-wheel steering. The available powerplants were three twin-cam inline-four engines—the 1.8-liter 4S-FE, plus the 3S-FE and higher-performance 3S-GE 2.0-liter units. Toyota also offered the 2.0-liter 2C-T turbo-diesel inline-four known from the previous generations, and for the flagship Camry Prominent only, the 2.0-liter 1VZ-FE gasoline V6. In May 1991 a 2.5-liter V6 engine also became available on the Camry Prominent, while the earlier 2-liter V6 became the "Prominent E".

An updated model appeared in July 1992. The scope of changes ranged from a new, larger grille and a revised air conditioning unit. At the same time the ZX Touring package appeared in place of the GT, which Toyota discontinued in conjunction with the sporting 3S-GE engine option. The 2.0 V6 engine was removed from the lineup at the same time, leaving the 2.5-liter unit as the only offering in the Camry Prominent.

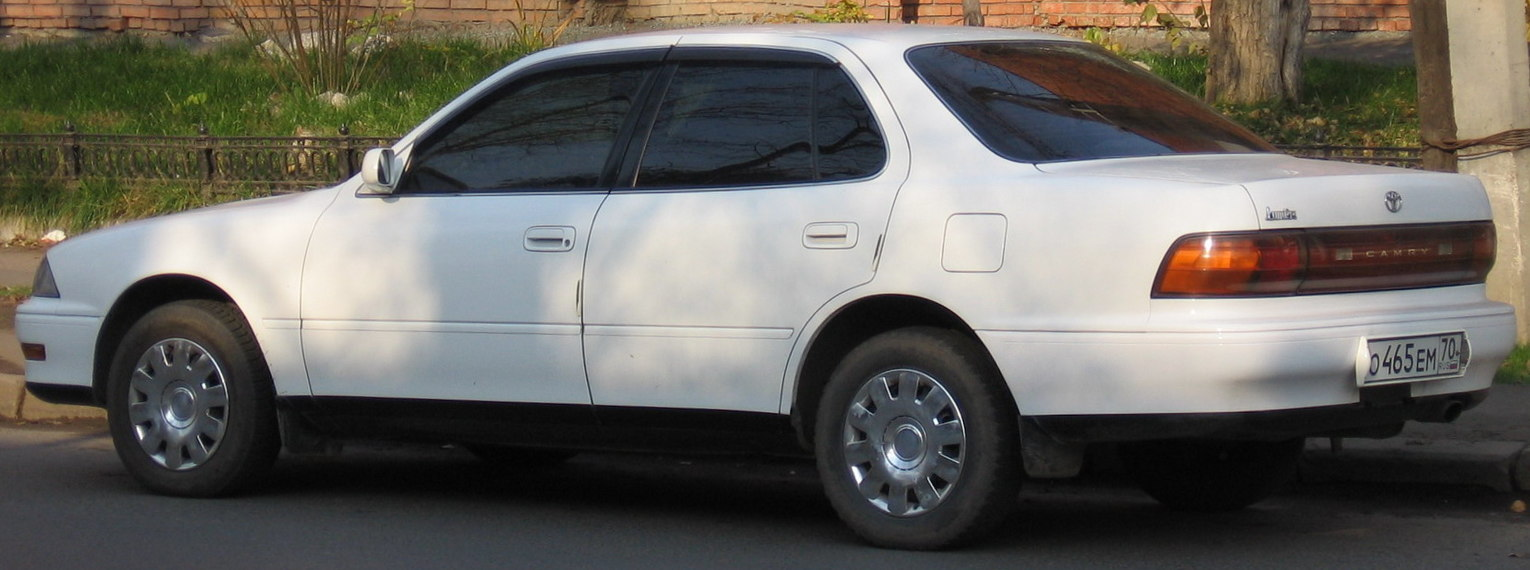
Camry sedan rear view (pre-facelift)

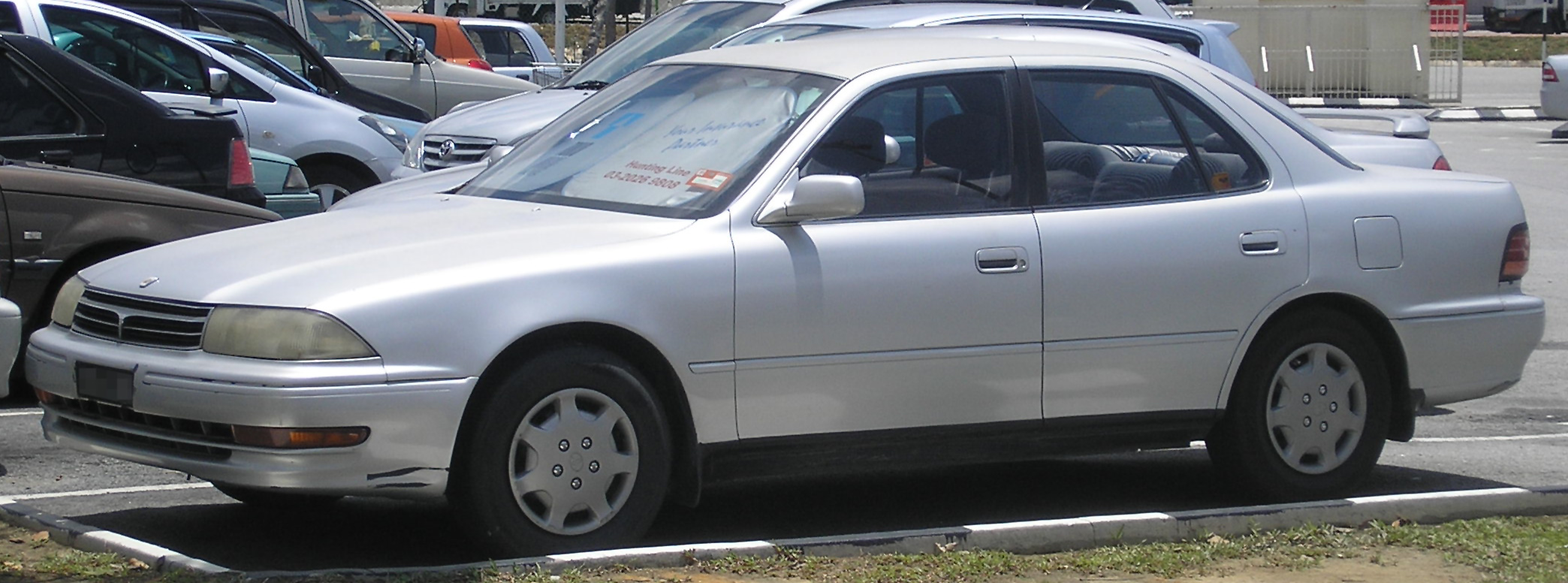
Camry sedan (facelift)

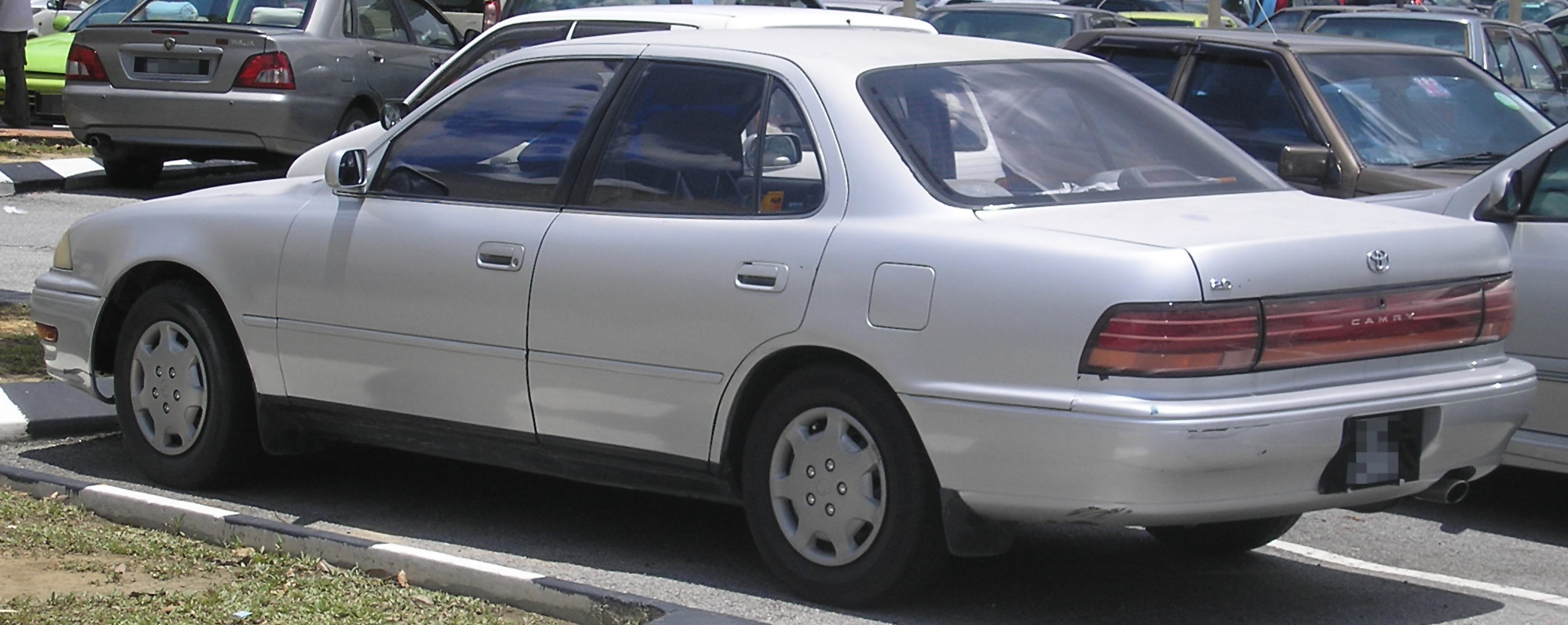
Camry sedan (facelift)

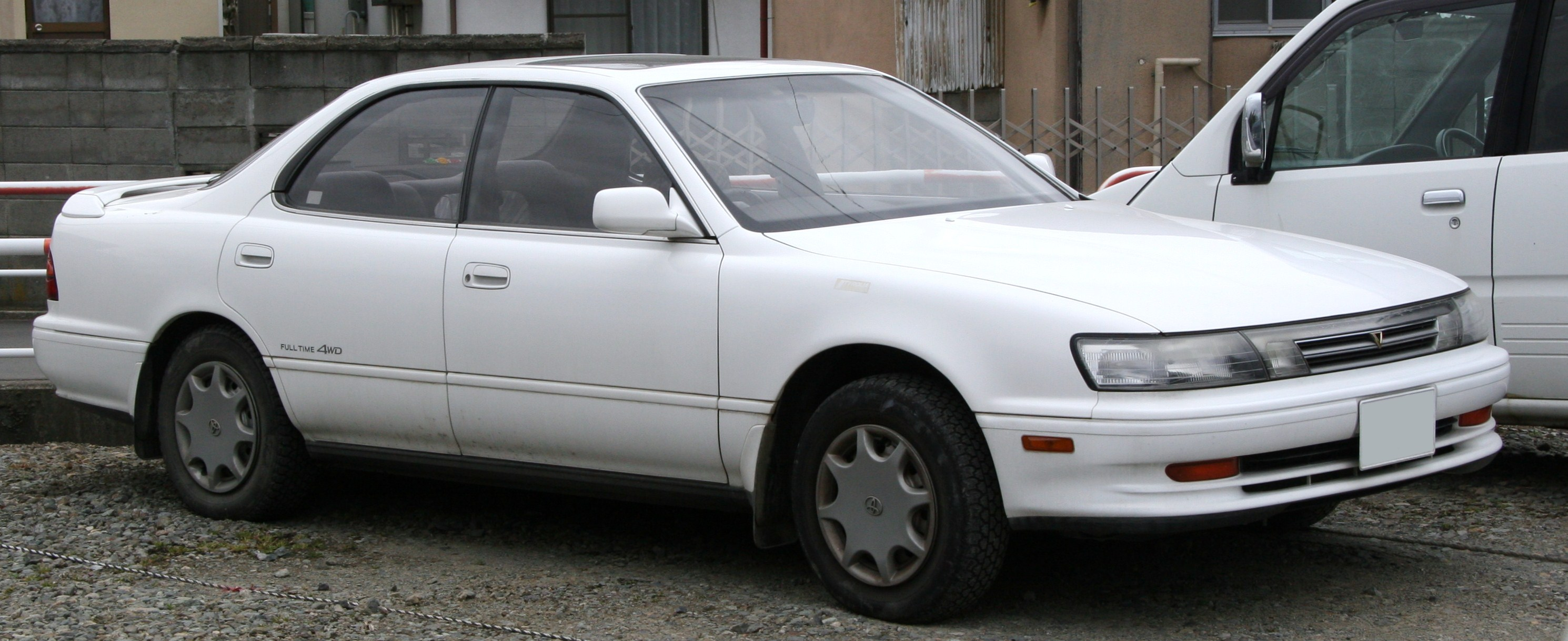
Vista hardtop

=== V40 (1994–1998) ===
V40
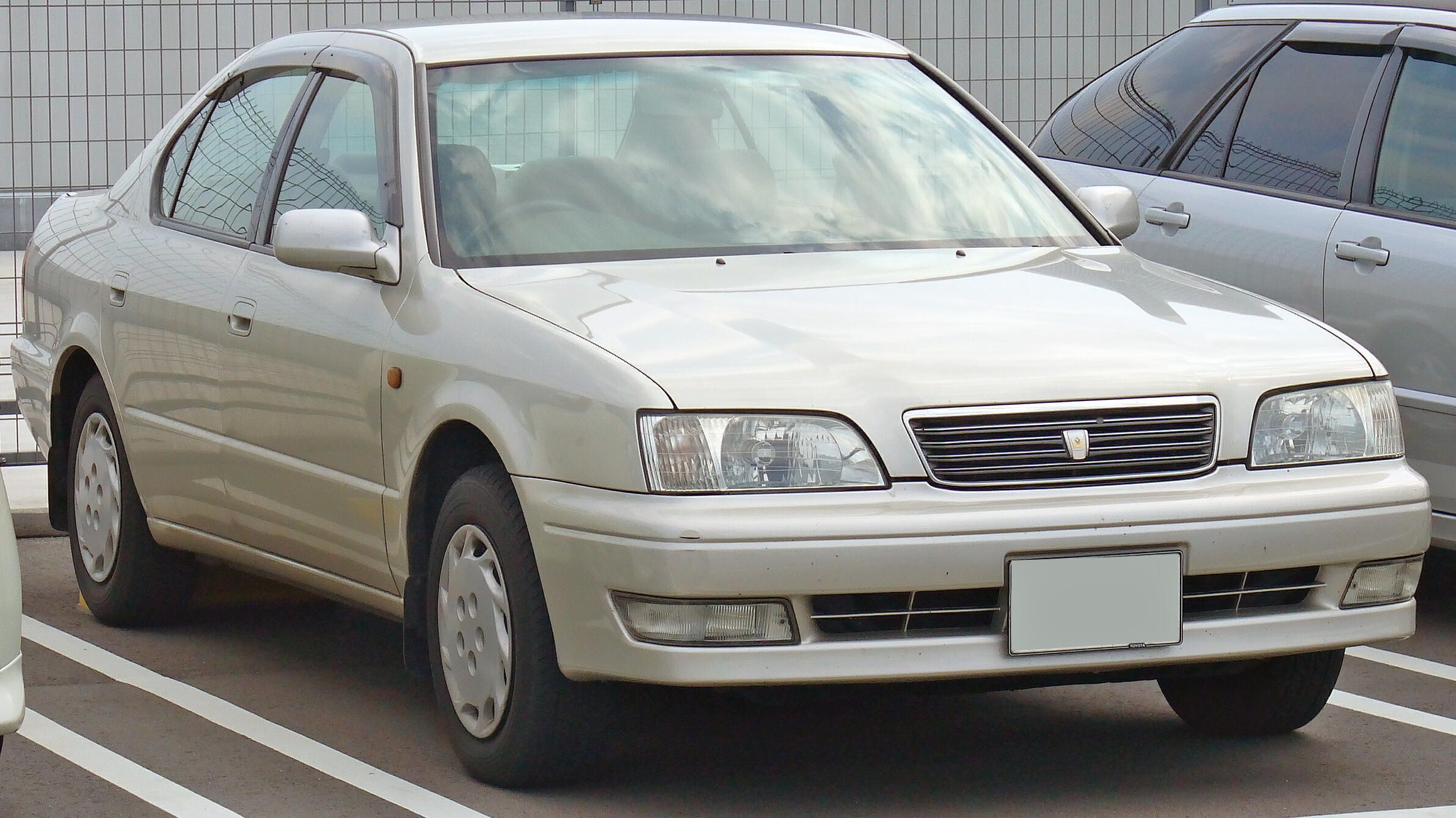
- 1996 Toyota Camry sedan (facelift)

Overview
- Model code: V40
- Also called: Toyota Vista
- Production: July 1994–July 1998 (JDM)
- Assembly: Japan: Toyota, Aichi (Tsutsumi plant)

Body and chassis
- Body style: 4-door sedan; 4-door hardtop sedan (Vista only)
- Layout: Transverse front-engine, front-wheel-drive; Transverse front-engine, four-wheel-drive

Powertrain
- Engine: 1.8 L I4 gasoline 4S-FE; 2.0 L I4 gasoline 3S-FE; 2.2 L I4-T diesel 3C-T

Dimensions
- Wheelbase: 2,650 mm (104.3 in)
- Length: 4,625 mm (182.1 in)
- Width: 1,695 mm (66.7 in)
- Height: 1,410–1,435 mm (55.5–56.5 in)

The Camry V40 appeared in July 1994 exclusively for the Japanese market. The Toyota Vista twin continued on, although the Camry Prominent hardtop was no longer offered; only the Vista was available as a hardtop. As before in previous generations, the Camry was exclusive to Toyota Corolla Store, while the Vista was only available at Toyota Vista Store locations.

V40 continued to be built around the 4,700 mm (185.0 in) x 1,700 mm (66.9 in) length-width bracket, legacy of a Japanese taxation law. The car is 15 mm (0.6 in) taller than its predecessor.

Engines for the V40 were a 1.8-liter (4S-FE type) and 2.0-liter (3S-FE type), and a 2.2-liter turbo-diesel (3C-T type). At launch only the 2.0-liter model was available in all-wheel drive mode, although afterwards the 2.2-liter turbodiesel could be optioned with this system.

Toyota updated the V40 in June 1996. In the update anti-lock brakes and dual air bags became standard equipment. After 1998, the Japanese market Camry and international Camry became in-line with each other, with the Vista taking over the V30 and V40 Camry roles.

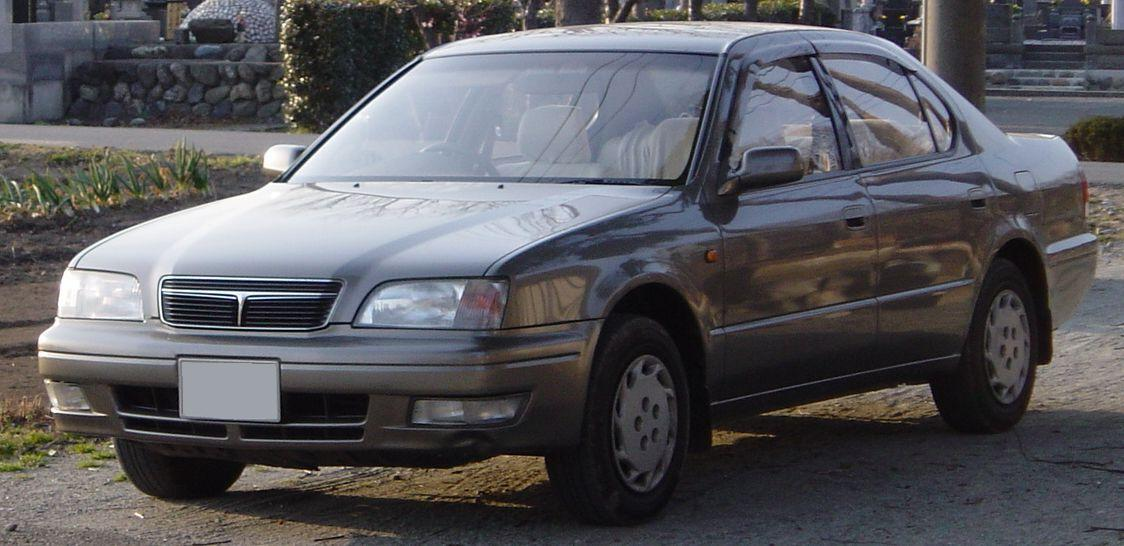
Camry sedan (pre-facelift)

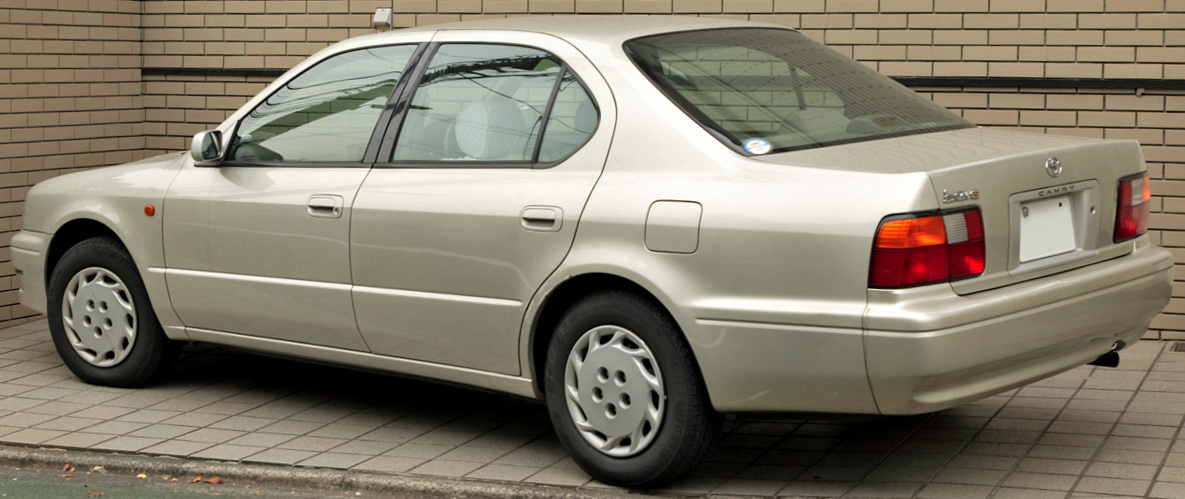
Camry 2.0 Lumière G (facelift)

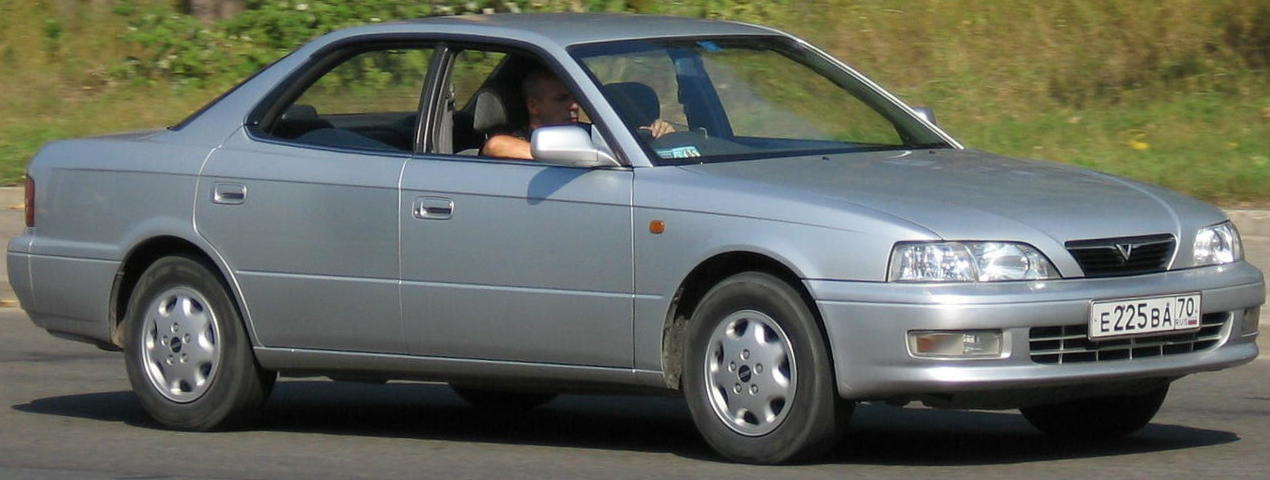
Vista hardtop (pre-facelift)

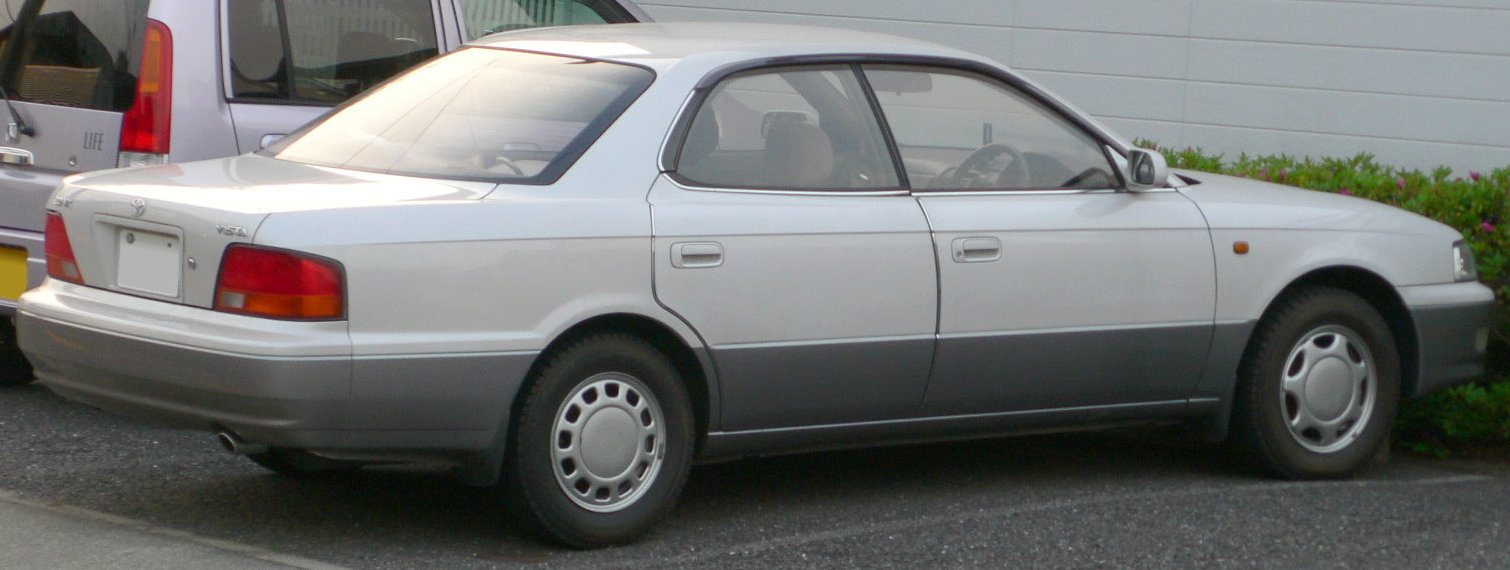
Vista hardtop rear view (pre-facelift)

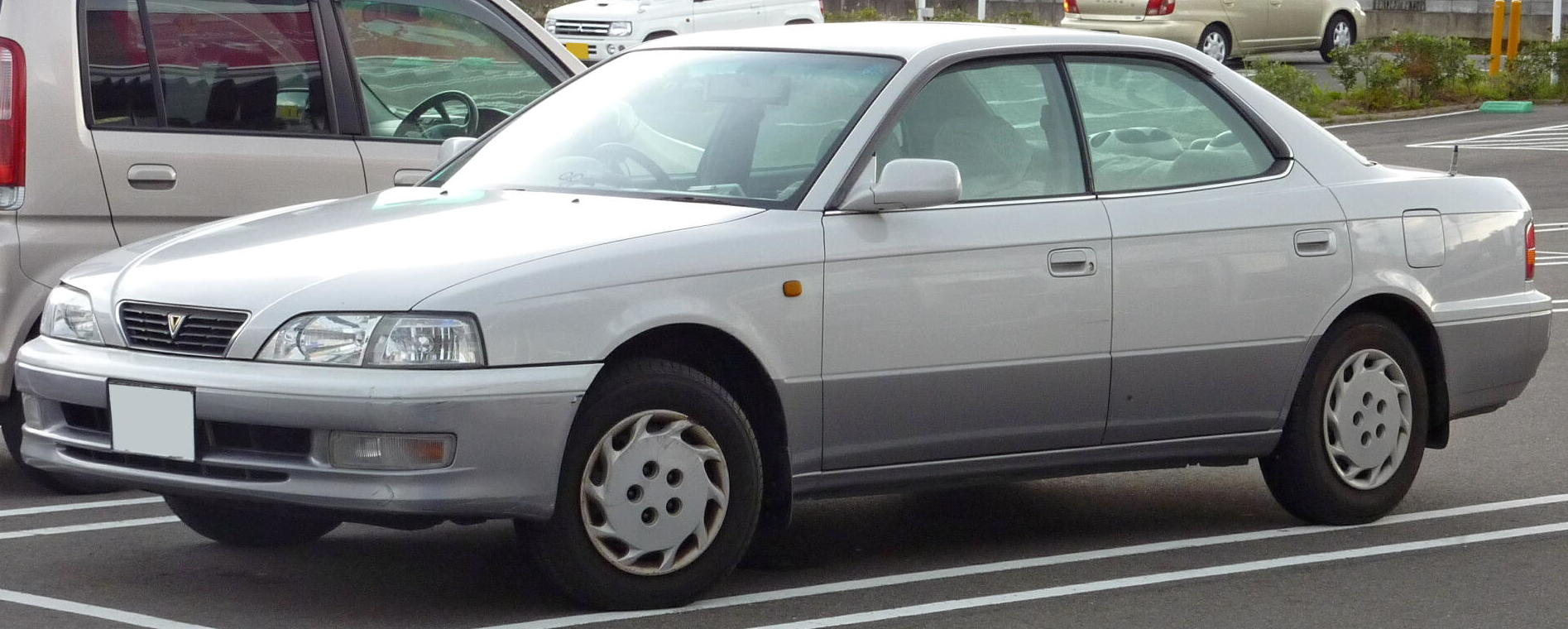
Vista hardtop (facelift)

=== V50 (1998–2003) ===
V50
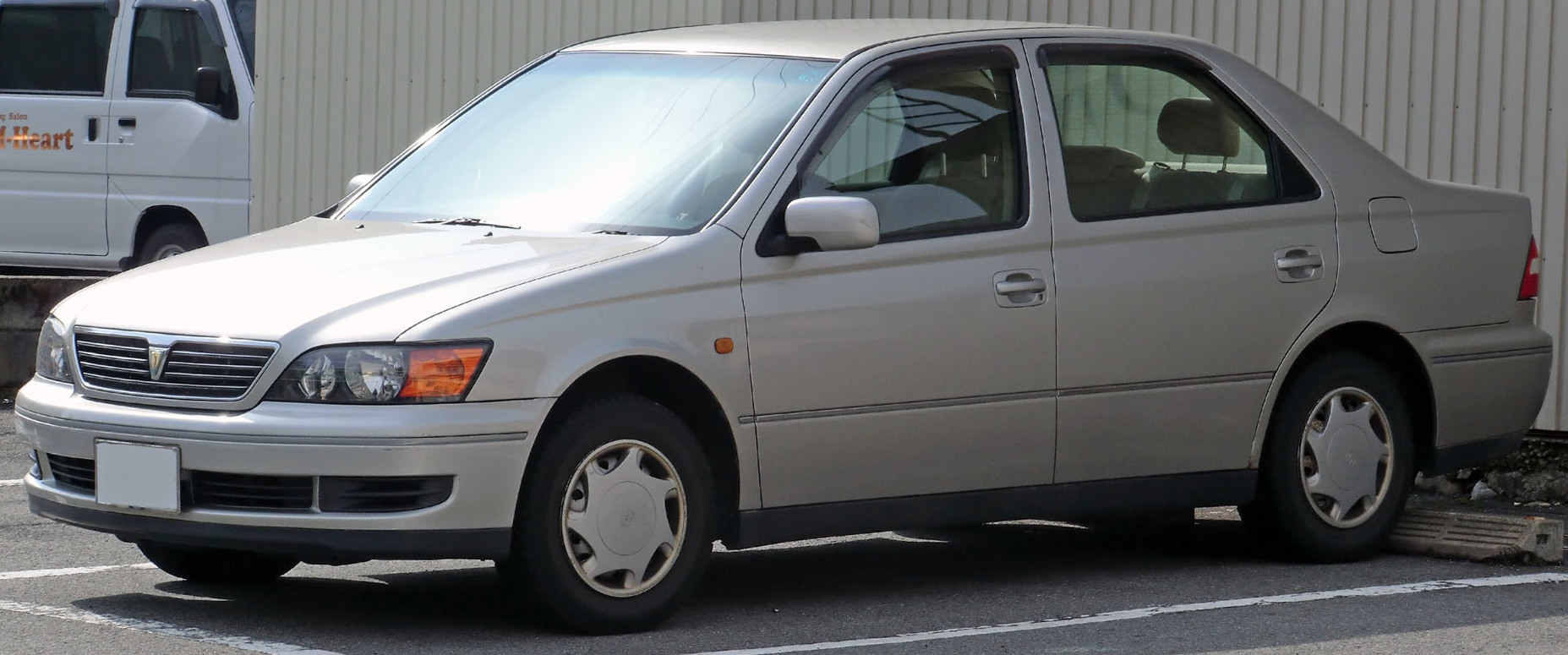

Overview
- Model code: V50
- Production: July 1998 – October 2003
- Assembly: Japan: Toyota, Aichi (Tsutsumi plant)

Body and chassis
- Body style: 4-door sedan; 5-door station wagon
- Layout: Transverse front-engine, front-wheel-drive; Transverse front-engine, four-wheel-drive
- Platform: Toyota MC platform
- Related: Toyota Opa

Powertrain
- Engine: 1.8 L I4; 2.0 L I4

Dimensions
- Wheelbase: 2,700 mm (110 in)
- Length: 4,670 mm (184 in)
- Width: 1,695 mm (66.7 in)
- Height: 1,505–1,515 mm (59.3–59.6 in)
- Curb weight: 1,310 kg (2,890 lb)

Chronology
- Successor: Toyota Avensis (T250)

The V50 generation was not available as a Camry—only as a Vista—as a sedan, plus a station wagon called Vista Ardeo. 1.8 L and 2.0 L engines were available. The interior features a center instrument panel/navigation display.

Vista V50 is significant because it's one of the first fruits of Toyota's company-wide platform renewal efforts known as the MC. Studies for new front-wheel drive (FWD) platform and packaging layout began in 1993 and appeared on market in December 1997 in the Toyota Prius, but the Vista is the first mass-production, FWD Toyota with a new platform. Toyota claims this is the first true redesign and rethink of its FWD platforms since the 1982 Camry/Vista. With this platform, Toyota trades the rear MacPherson struts for a torsion beam axle setup. A double-wishbone setup is available for all-wheel drive. Toyota also flipped the engine orientation so that the intake manifold is in front, improving space efficiency.

Vista production ended in September 2003, as Toyota prepared to rename the Vista dealership network as Toyota Netz. In October 2003, the Vista was replaced by the second generation Avensis. The move to simplify Toyota's dealership organization came in light of the pending (August 2005) launch of Lexus in Japan. In April 2005 the process was complete and all Vista dealers became Netz dealers.

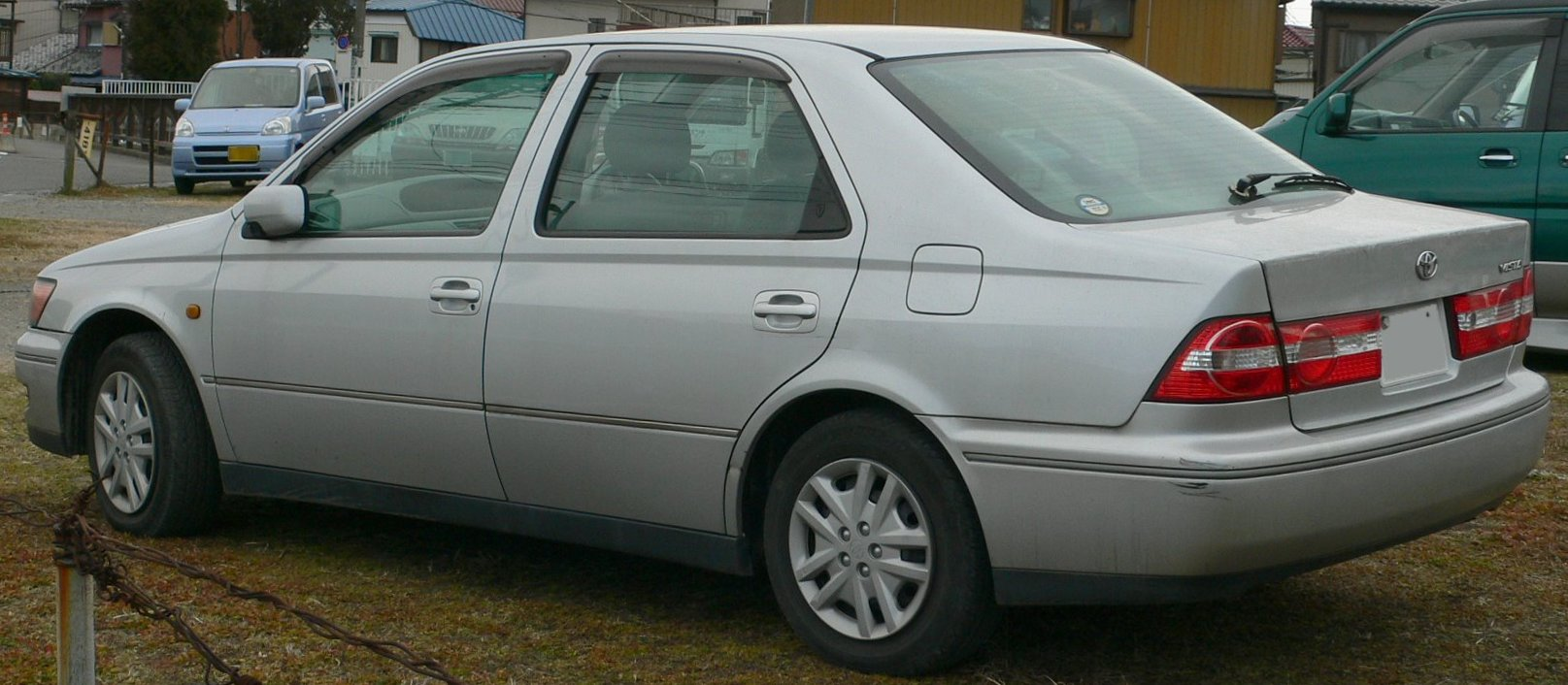
Vista sedan (pre-facelift)

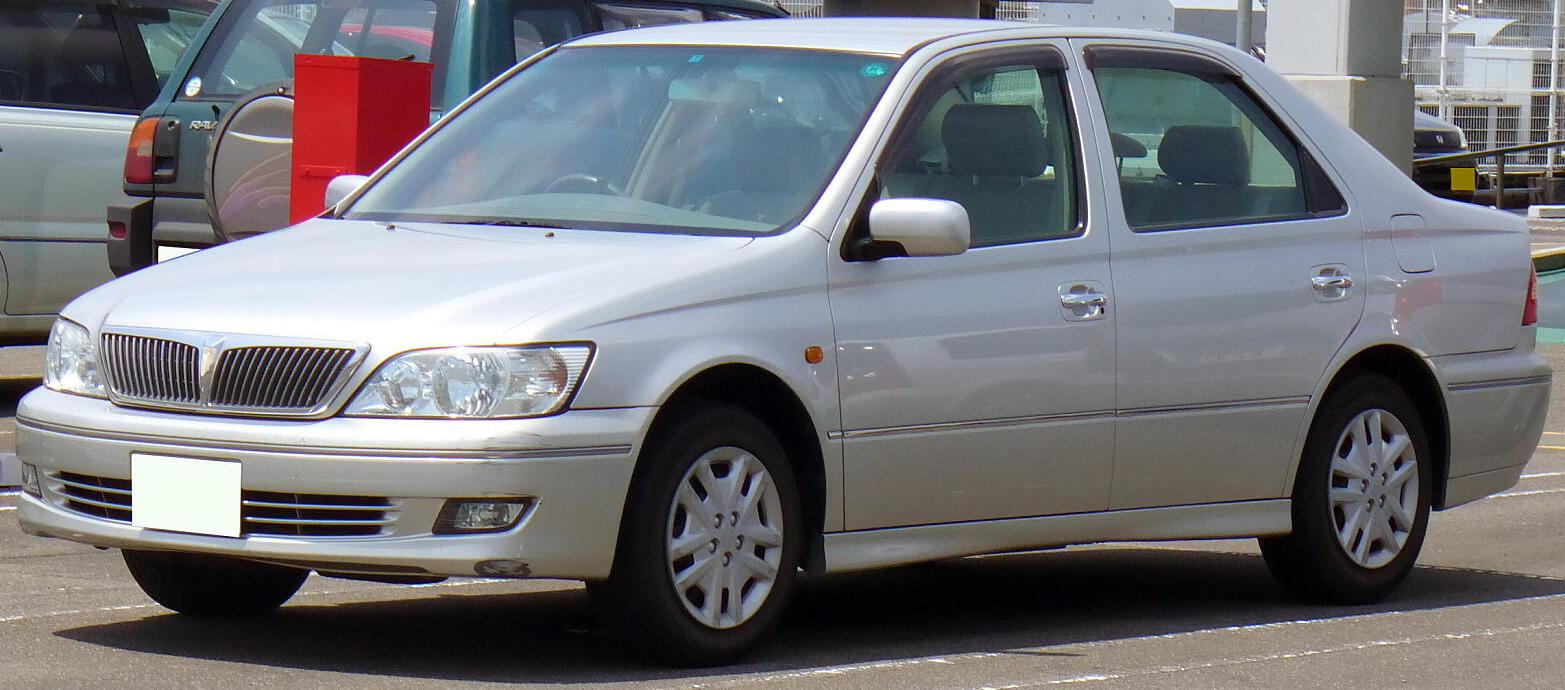
Vista sedan (facelift)

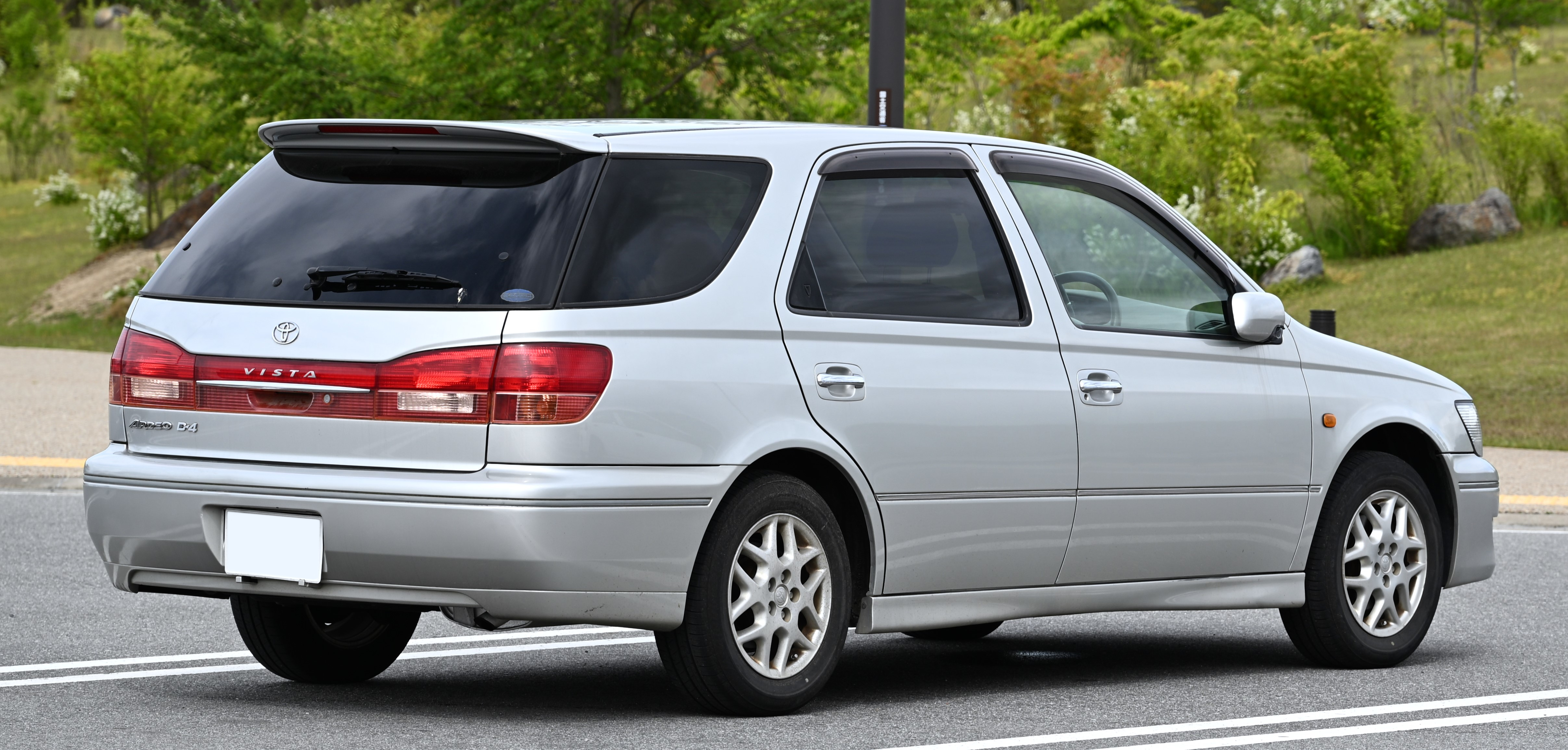
Vista Ardeo wagon (facelift)

== Wide-body ==
=== XV10 (1991–1996) ===
XV10
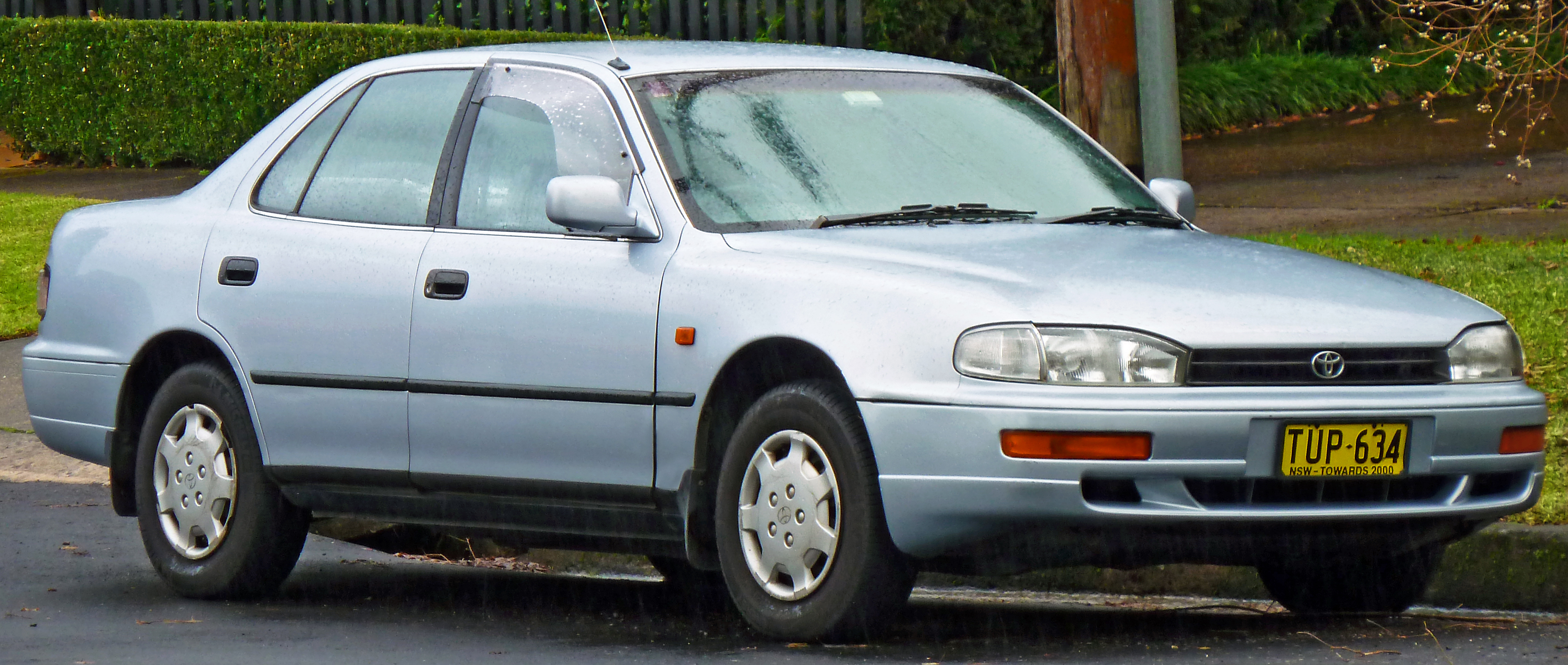
- Pre-facelift Camry sedan (Australia)

Overview
- Model code: XV10
- Also called: Holden Apollo (Australia); Toyota Scepter (Japan); Toyota Vienta (Australia, V6)
- Production: 1991–1996 (Japan and United States); 1992–1997 (Australia)
- Model years: 1992–1996
- Designer: Osamu Shikado (1988)

Body and chassis
- Body style: 2-door coupé; 4-door sedan; 5-door station wagon

Toyota replaced the compact V20 Camry with the Japanese market-only V30 series in 1990. However, international markets such as Australia and North America received a widened version of the V30, known as the XV10 series. While marginally larger than the V20, the V30 had to comply with Japanese dimension regulations, which restricted the car's width to 1,700 mm (67 in) and length to 4,700 mm (190 in) for a lower tax obligation. Particularly in the United States, this narrower model was seen as compromised, thus limiting its sales potential. As a result, the "wide-body" mid-size Camry (XV10) released to North America in 1991 was developed from early 1988 and the final design frozen later that year. It was with the XV10 that Toyota upgraded the Camry's status to its second "world car" after the Corolla, with exports starting from Australia to Southeast Asia. Japan also received the wider XV10 model, although it was sold under the Toyota Scepter name there. Toyota chose the name "Scepter" as a reference to the Camry/Crown naming tradition, as a "scepter" is a symbolic ornamental staff held by a ruling monarch, a prominent item of royal regalia.

A notable point of the "Wide body" SXV10 Camry is the influence of engineering developed from the launch of Lexus and the LS400, which came to market just a few years prior to its public debut. The kinship to Lexus models in engineering standards (such as CMM and GD&T development standards) and tolerances on the SXV10 is often perceived to be closer than any prior or latter iterations of the Camry. In an interview with Automotive News, Chris Hostetter, group vice president for Toyota NA, admitted that the 1992 Camry was considered by many company insiders to be more of a "Lexus product" than most Toyota badge cars, going on to mention that it borrowed technologies such as hydraulically powered cooling fans directly developed from the ES300. However, the Lexus standards of the SXV10 created a division in product development philosophies in the company. Also according to Automotive News, some company insiders considered it too upscale for its price point and the market segment it was set to compete within (mid-sized, mid-segment).

It was Robert McCurry in conjunction with Dave Illingworth and Jim Press, who, with great initial opposition from the Japanese executives, convinced the Japanese company that the 1992 Camry be re-designed, enlarged, and shaped to resemble a scaled-down LS400 with a more affordable FWD format, to help establish the reputation of Lexus, which at the time was still in its infancy and lacked brand heritage. The intensive platform and component sharing with the 1992 ES300 allowed Toyota to leverage costs better to allow the SXV10 Camry's high level of specification at a reasonable price. The 1992 Camry also took more resemblance to the LS400 in the sloped roofline, wide C pillar and framed windows, where as the ES300 featured a hardtop design with an upgraded/stiffened suspension. However, the LS400 and the SXV10 Camry featured no sharing of powertrain layout nor design. Many insiders of Toyota argued even after critical acclaim that the SXV10 Camry overlapped too greatly with Lexus, even though Chris Hostetter, current vice president of advanced technology research at Toyota, believed the model had to be developed to develop buyers who would become interested in Lexus. This division as well as cost-cutting led to the Camry and Lexus line to become more distinctive, as the Camry became a more economical, affordable, spacious sedan typical of the segment.

The smaller V30 Camry varied in other areas besides the size. Although the underpinnings, doors and fenders, and overall basic design cues were common between the two cars, the smaller Camry sported harder, more angular front- and rear-end styling treatment, with the wide-body model presenting a more curvaceous silhouette. This was a departure from the V20 generation Camry which, although had many more rounded panels than the V10 series, was nevertheless generally slab-sided in shape. A two-door Camry coupé was added to compete with the Honda Accord coupé. However, the Camry Coupé was never popular and was dropped in 1996. A two-door Camry would not be reintroduced until 1999, with the Toyota Camry Solara.

The Japanese V30 model was replaced by the Camry V40 in 1994, however, this was also a Japan-only model. International markets instead retained the wider XV10 until it was replaced by the XV20 in 1996. The V40 and XV20 models were sold alongside one another in the Japanese market until 1998. At this time, the Vista V50 took the place of the V40, ending the period of separate Camrys for the Japanese and international markets.

The XV10, at its most basic level, offered a 2.2-liter 5S-FE four-cylinder engine, up from 2.0 liters in the V20 and V30 Camrys. This unit produced 97 kW (130 hp) of power and 197 N⋅m (145 lb⋅ft) of torque, although the exact figures varied slightly depending on the market. Power and displacement increases were also received for the V6 engine. The 3.0-liter 3VZ-FE unit was rated at 138 kW (185 hp) and 264 N⋅m (195 lb⋅ft). An all-new aluminum 1MZ-FE V6 debuted in North American models from 1993 for the 1994 model year, with other markets retaining the 3VZ-FE V6. Power and torque rose to 140 kW (190 hp) and 275 N⋅m (203 lb⋅ft), respectively.

In Australia, the V6 engine Camry was badged "Camry Vienta" when launched in 1993, later becoming the Toyota Vienta in 1995. In South Africa, the XV10 Camry was manufactured by Toyota SA in Durban from 1992 to 2002, offering both the 2.2-liter and 3.0-liter engines, as well as a 2.0-liter engine derived from the Celica. Only a sedan configuration was available. These were also marketed and sold into Namibia, Botswana and Zimbabwe.

A variant of the UK market V6 model - detuned to run on 91 rather than 95 octane unleaded gasoline - was launched in New Zealand in 1991. These Japanese-built models were replaced with an Australian-made line, with unique New Zealand specification, in 1993 at which point the 2.2-liter I4 was offered as well.

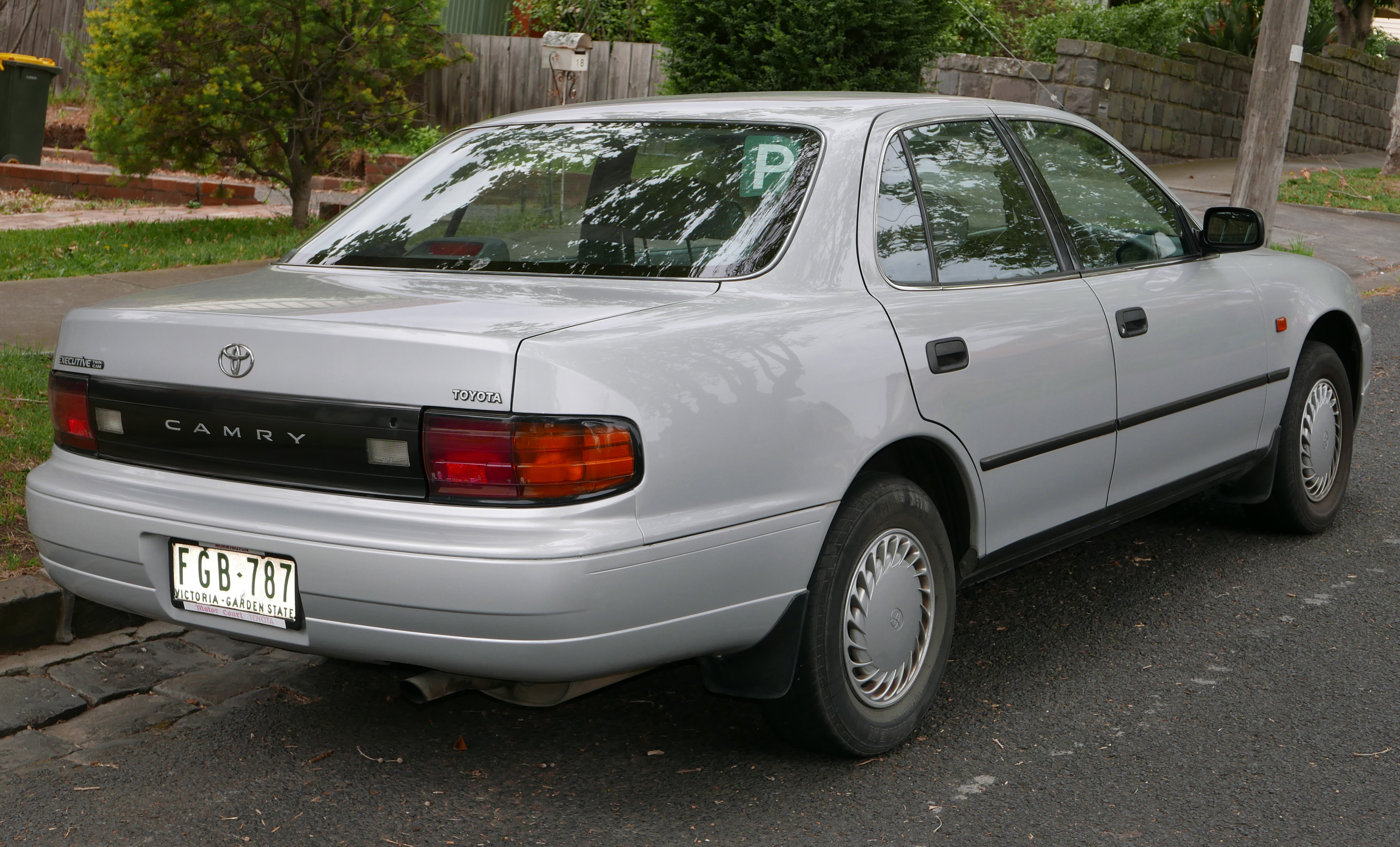
Camry sedan (Australia; pre-facelift)

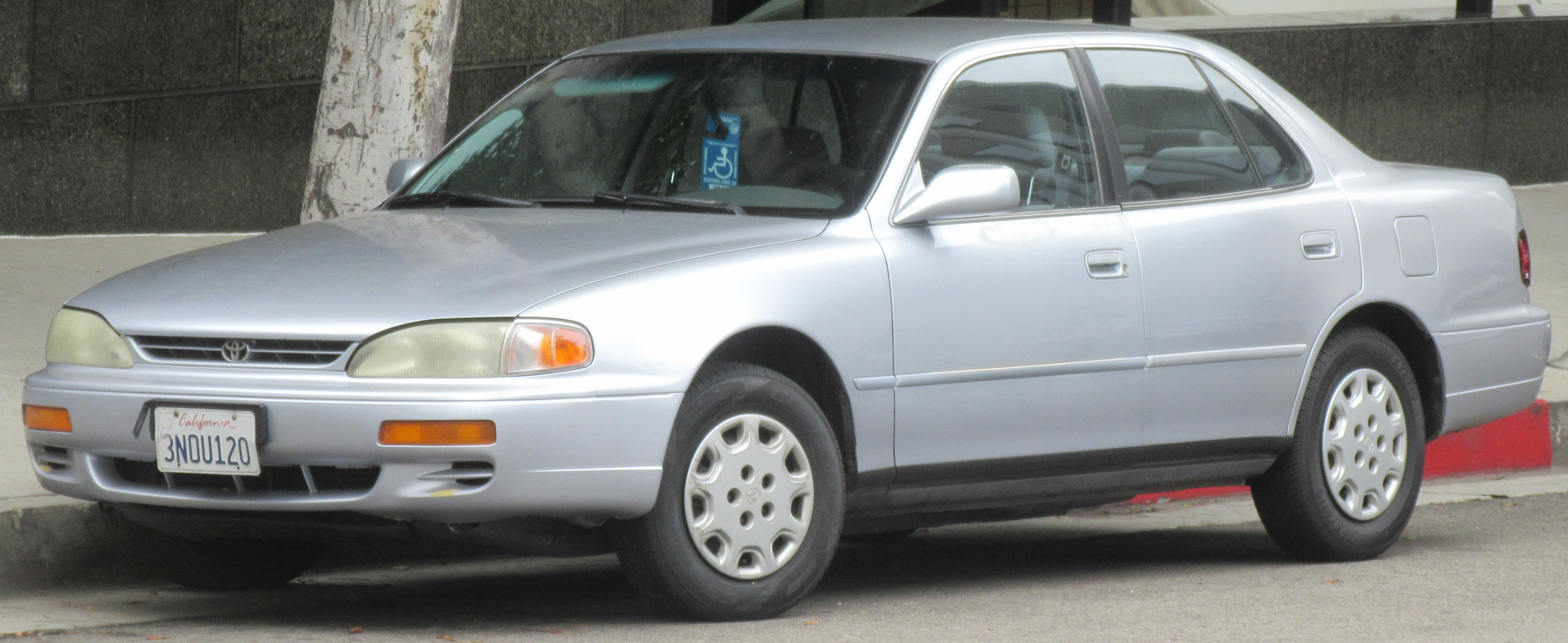
Camry sedan (US; facelift)

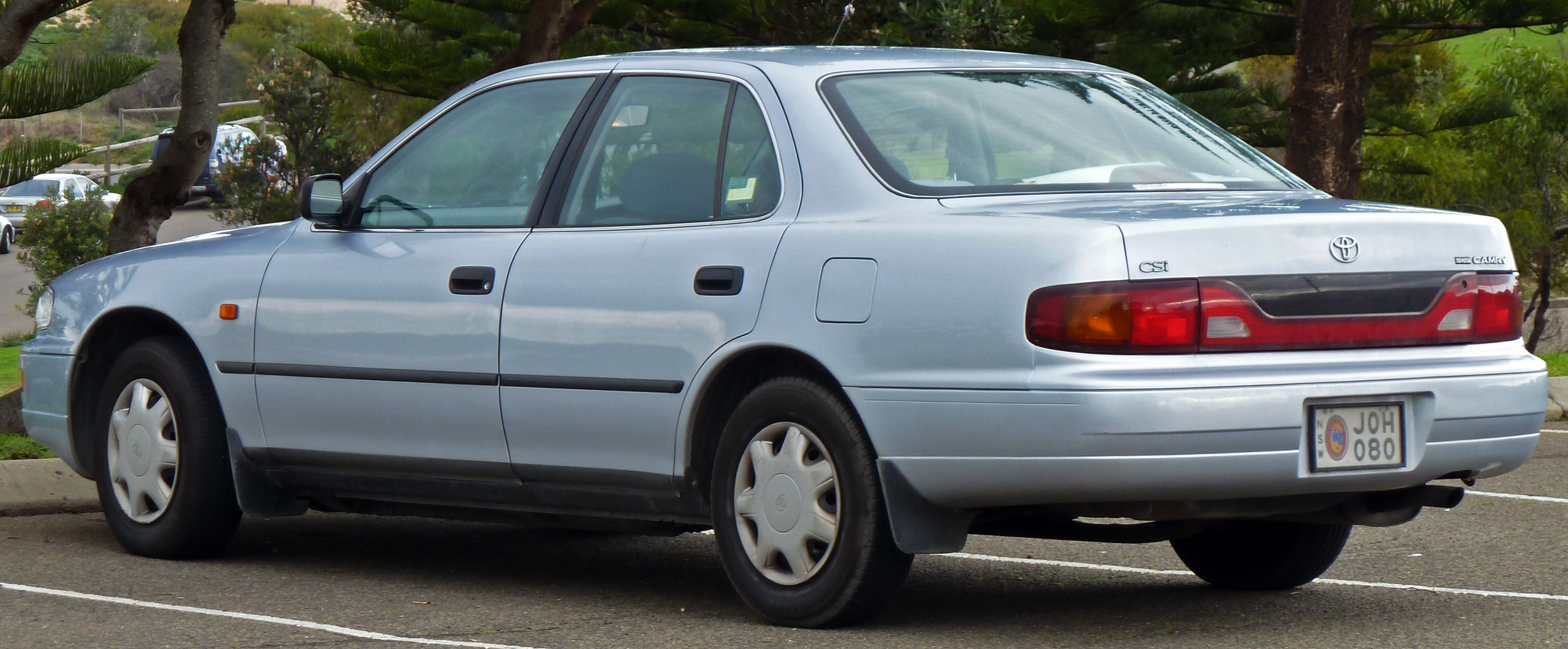
Camry sedan (Australia; facelift)

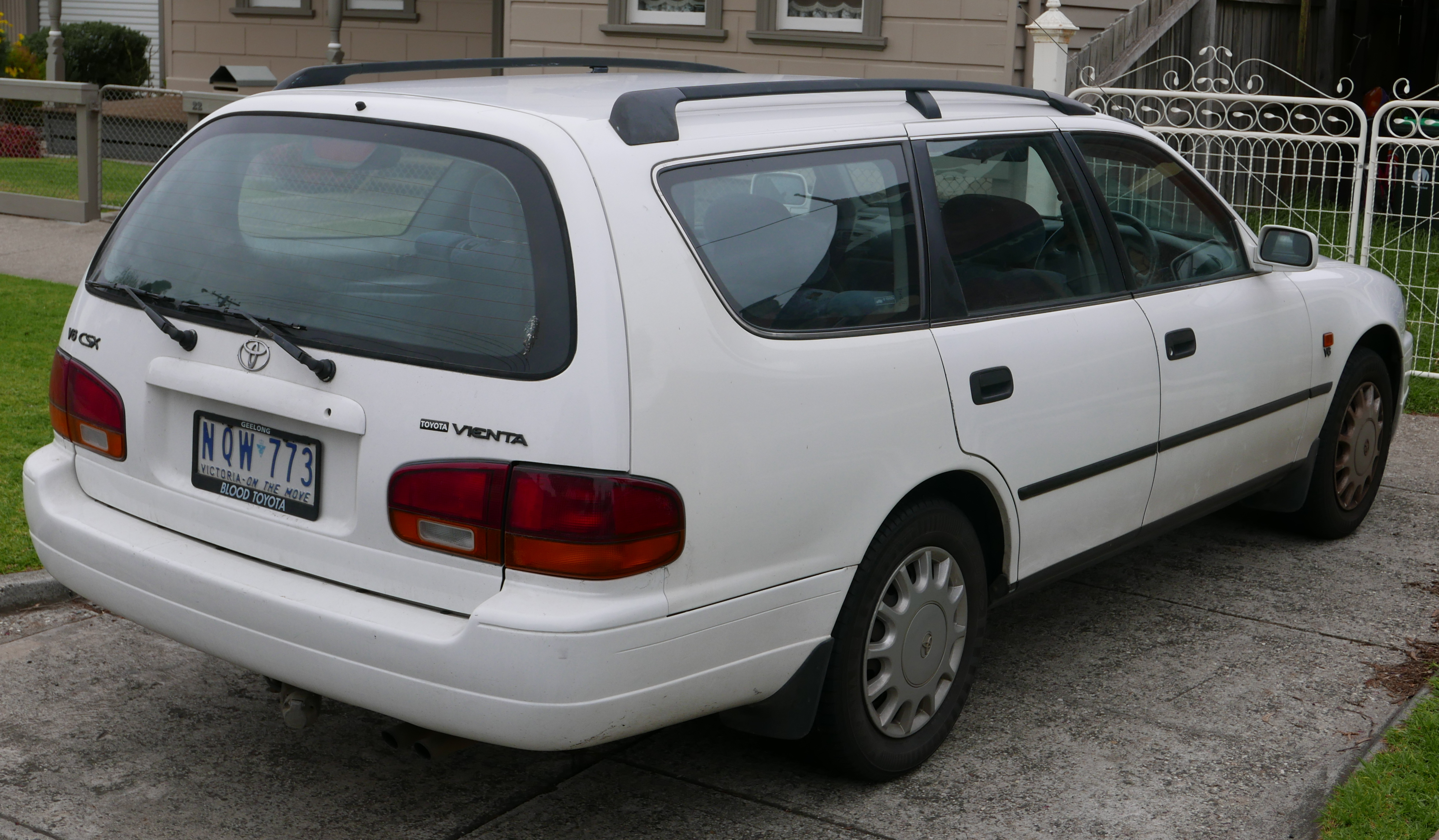
Vienta wagon (Australia)

=== XV20 (1996–2002) ===
XV20
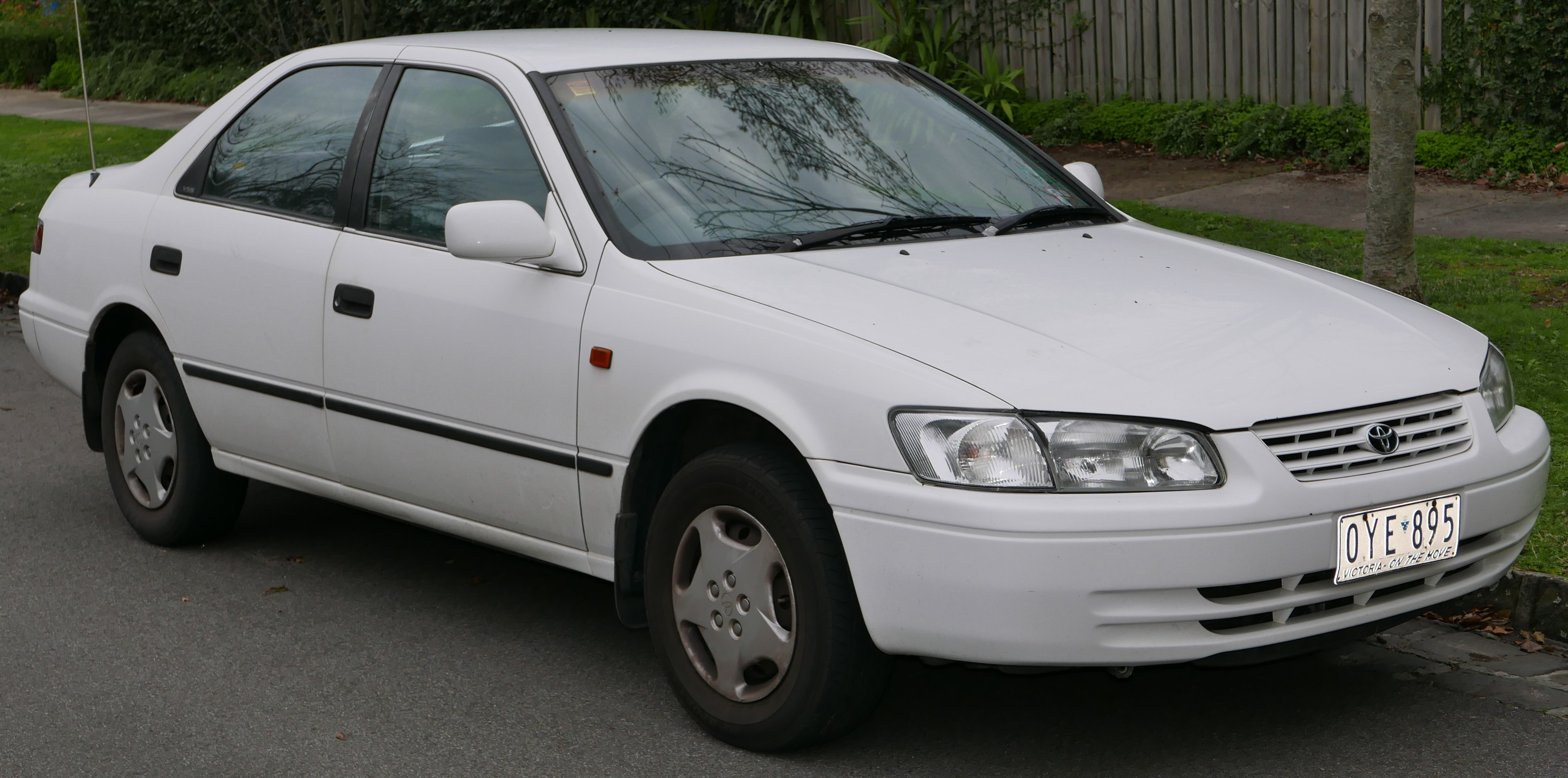
- Pre-facelift Camry 2.2 CSX sedan (SXV20R, Australia)

Overview
- Model code: XV20
- Also called: Daihatsu Altis (Japan); Toyota Vienta
- Production: 1996–2001; 1997–2002 (Australia)
- Model years: 1997–2001

Body and chassis
- Body style: 4-door sedan; 5-door station wagon

Powertrain
- Engine: 2.2 L I4 5S-FE; 3.0 L V6 1MZ-FE

In late 1991, development on the XV20 commenced after launch of the XV10 under the 415T program. Design work was frozen in early 1994 and later launched in the United States in September 1996 and Japan in December 1996. It continued as a sedan and station wagon (called the Camry Gracia in Japan), though the wagon was not sold in the United States. This was the first generation where it was sold in Japan as the Daihatsu Altis, replacing the Daihatsu Applause.

In August 1999 for the 2000 model year, the sedan models received a mid-model upgrade to the front and rear fascias, but remained otherwise similar to the 1997 to 1999 models.

In the United States, the Camry SE was dropped and the base model was renamed the CE for the 1997 model year. Both the LE and the XLE trims were carried over from the previous series. All trim levels were available with either the 2.2-liter I4 or the 3.0-liter V6 engine except the Solara SLE, which was only available with the V6. TRD offered a supercharger kit for 1997 through to 2000 V6 models raising power to 247 hp (184 kW) and 242 lb⋅ft (328 N⋅m) of torque. A coupe was added in 1999, and then a convertible form in 2000. In contrast to the coupe from the XV10 generation Camrys, the new two-door cars were given a separate nameplate Camry Solara, or simply Solara. They were also a significant styling departure from the sedan. The Solara was available in SE and SLE trims, corresponding roughly to the sedan's LE and XLE trims.

Power was increased slightly to 133 hp (99 kW) SAE for the 5S-FE 2.2 L I4 and 192 hp (143 kW) SAE for the 1MZ-FE V6. Manual transmissions (model: S51) were only available on the CE trim level, LE V6, and any Solara model. Camrys and Solaras equipped with the 5S-FE 4 cylinder engine and appropriate trim package received the S51 manual transmission, while those equipped with the 1MZ-FE 6 cylinder engine received the E153 manual transmission.

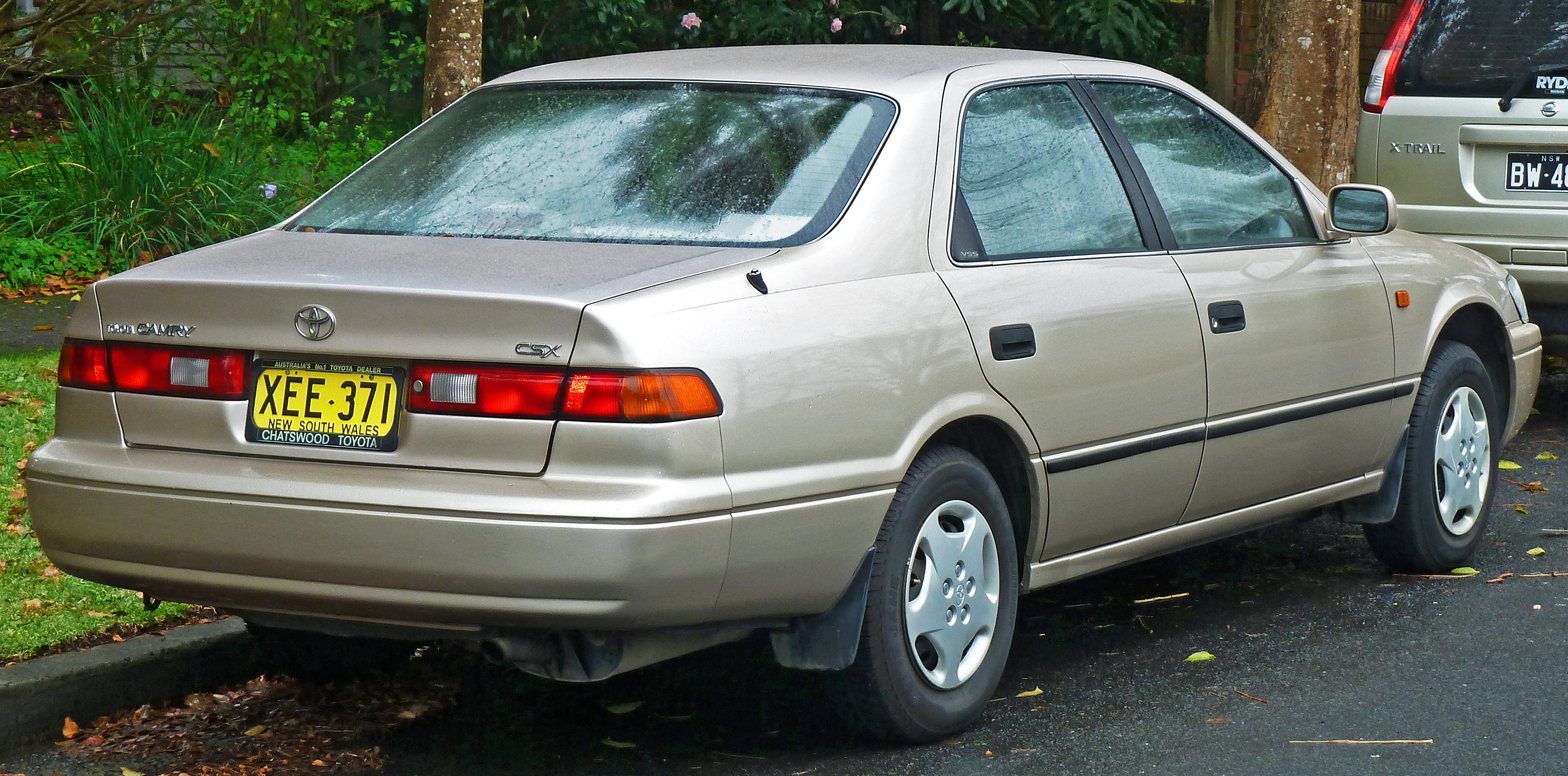
Pre-facelift Camry CSX sedan (SXV20R, Australia)

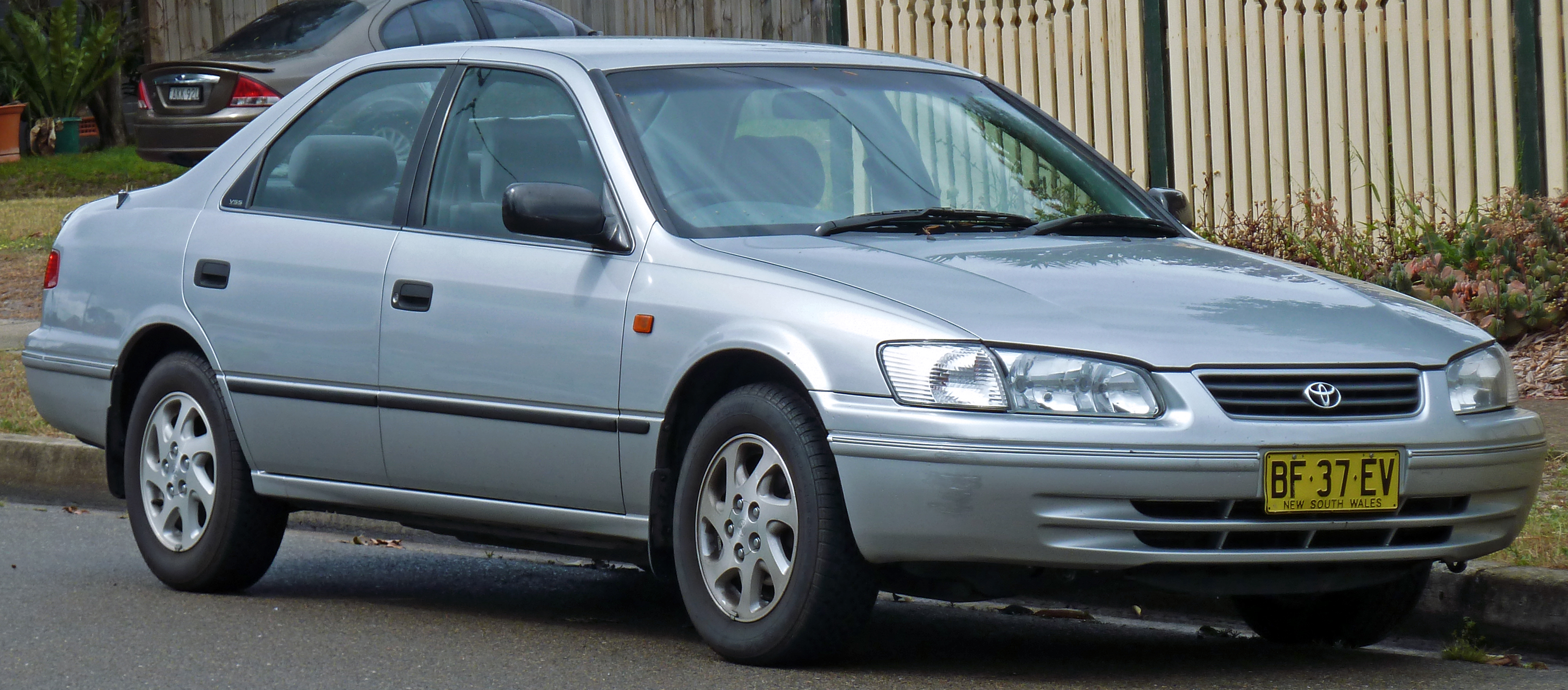
Facelift Camry Advantage sedan (SXV20R, Australia)

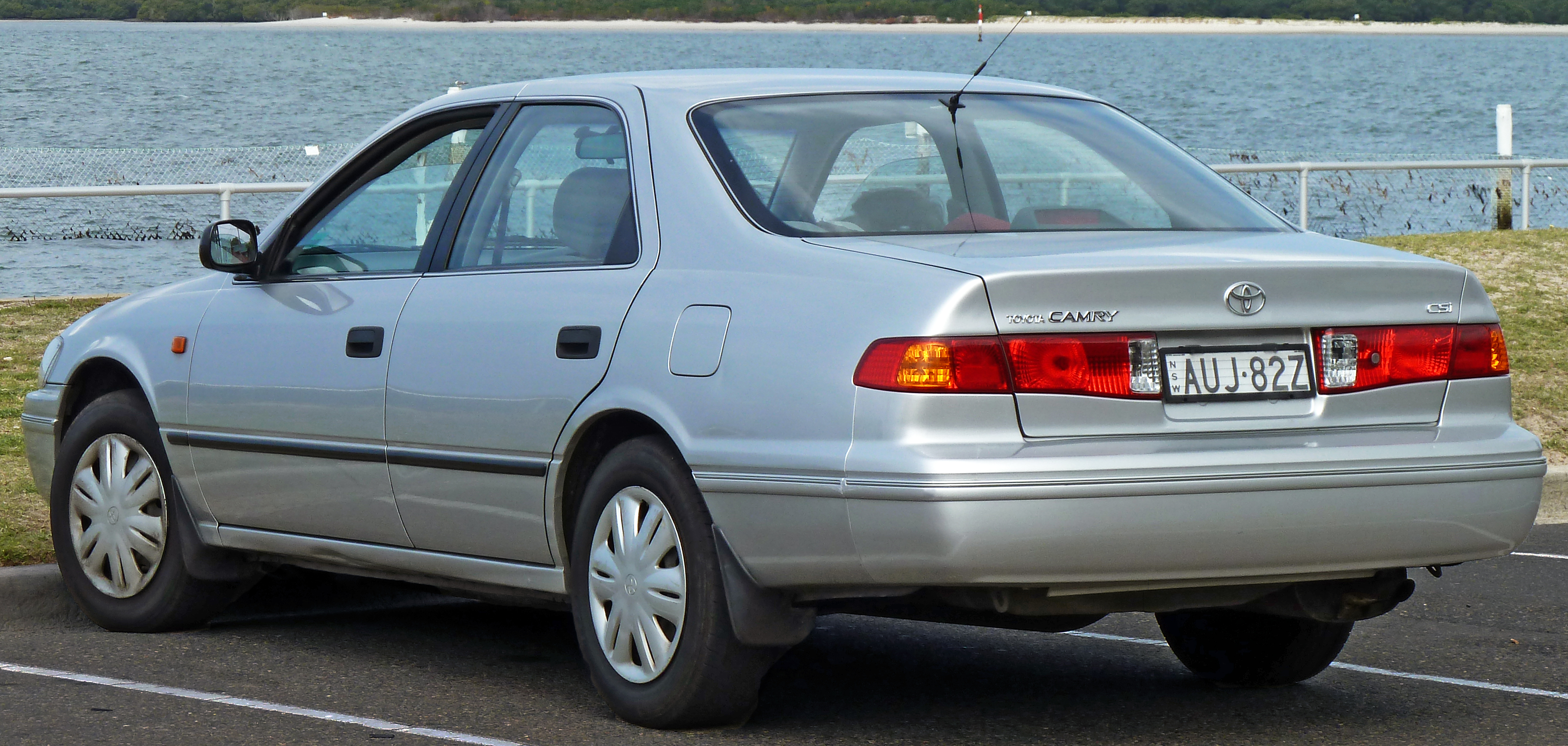
Facelift Camry CSI sedan (SXV20R, Australia)

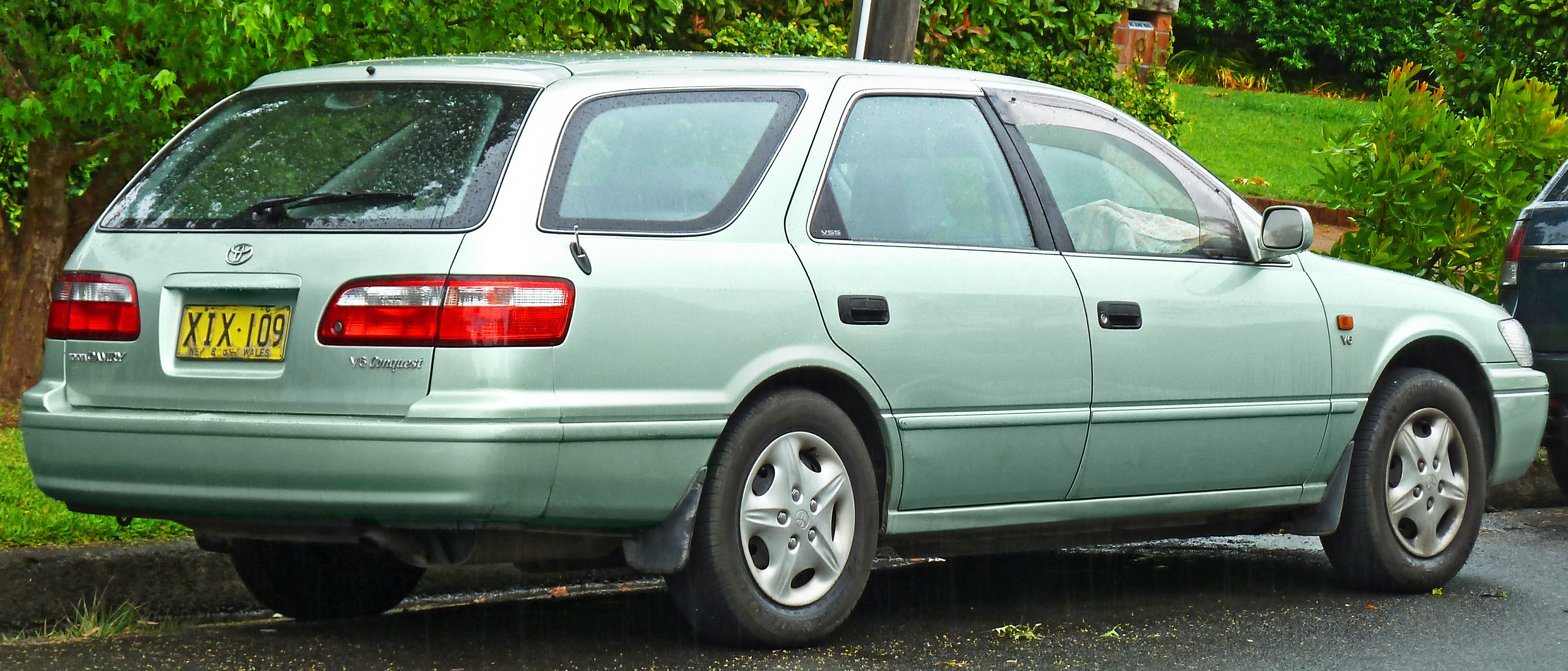
Facelift Camry V6 Conquest wagon (MCV20R, Australia)

=== XV30 (2001–2006) ===
XV30
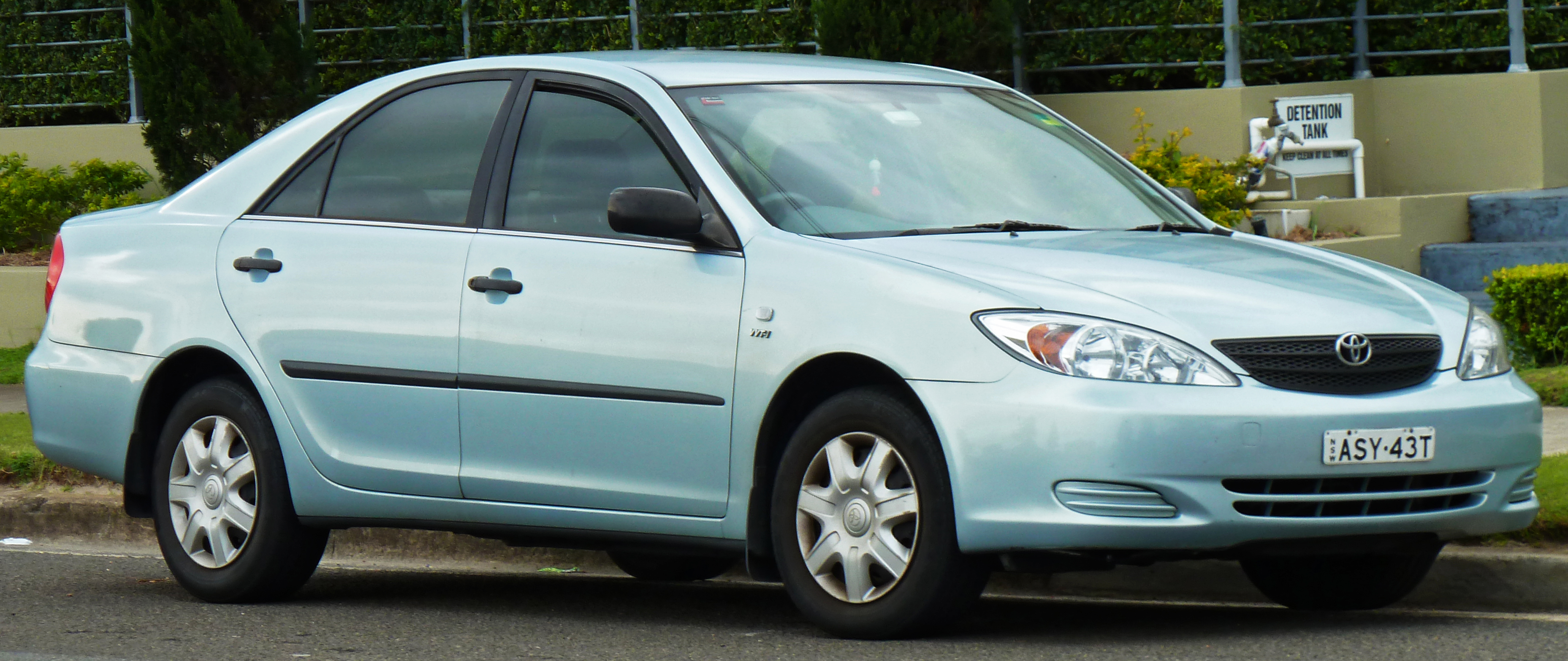
- Pre-facelift Camry (regular)

Overview
- Model code: XV30
- Also called: Daihatsu Altis (Japan)
- Production: 2001–2006; 2002–2006 (Australia)
- Model years: 2002–2006

Body and chassis
- Body style: 4-door sedan
- Platform: Toyota K platform

Chronology
- Successor: Toyota Avensis (T250) (Europe)

Regular

Released in September 2001 for the 2002 model year, Toyota released the Camry XV30 series as a larger sedan, but without a station wagon for the first time. The wagon's demise occurred due to its sales erosion to minivans and crossover SUVs.

Toyota redesigned this series from the ground up for the first time since the launch of the Camry nameplate. Through efficiency gains such as increased computerization, and by having the XV30 ride on the K platform introduced with the Toyota Highlander (XU20) of 2000, Toyota expedited the XV30 production development stage to 26 months, down from 36 months with the XV20. As a consequence, Toyota claimed the XV30 to have cost 30 percent less to design and develop than its predecessor. XV30 also had increased parts content over the XV20, but did not cost any more to manufacture.

Until the 2003 model year, the Camry Solara remained on the XV20 series chassis, and received only minor styling upgrades to the front and rear ends. However, the Solara did receive the same 2.4-liter 2AZ-FE I4 engine that was available on the Camry sedan. The US received three engine options, a 115 kW (154 hp) 2.4-liter inline-four, a 142 kW (190 hp) 3.0-liter V6, and a 157 kW (210 hp) 3.3-liter version of the same. The 3.3-liter was only available for the Camry's sportier "SE" model.

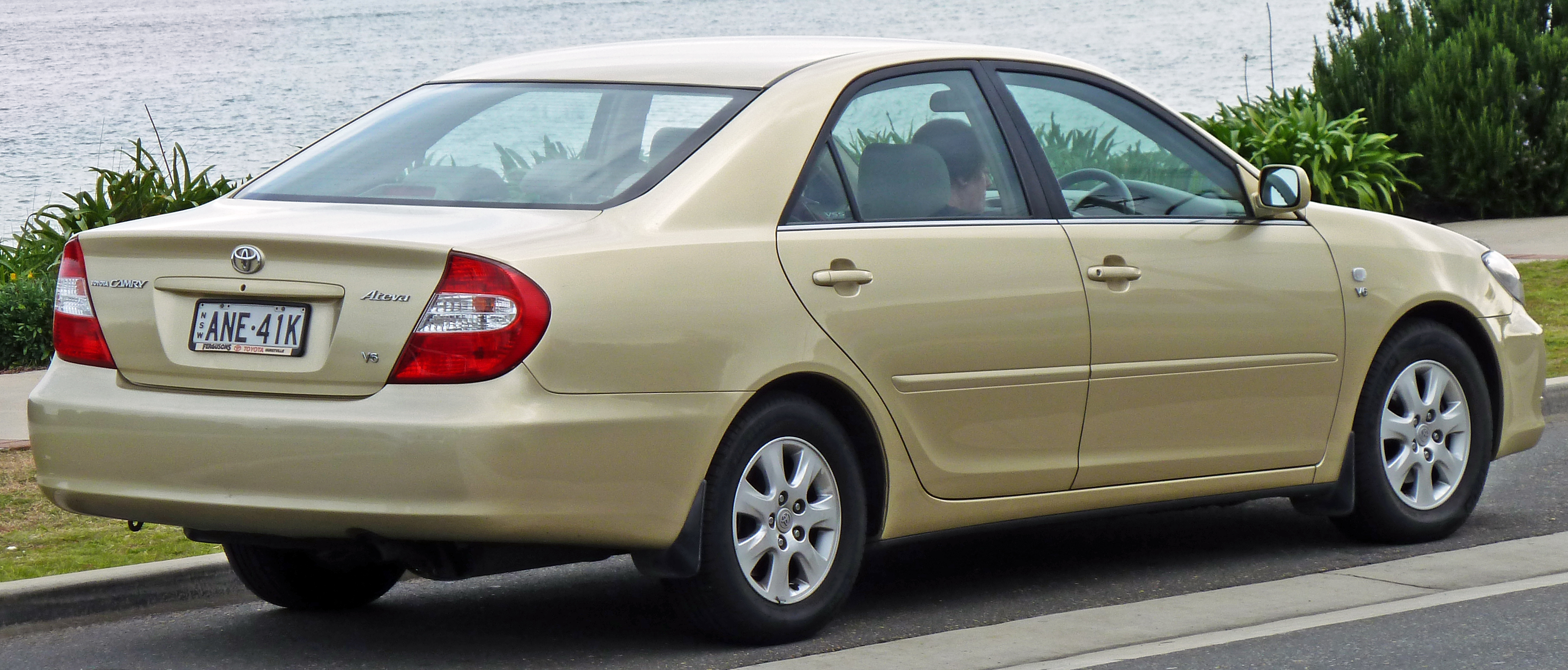
Camry (pre-facelift)

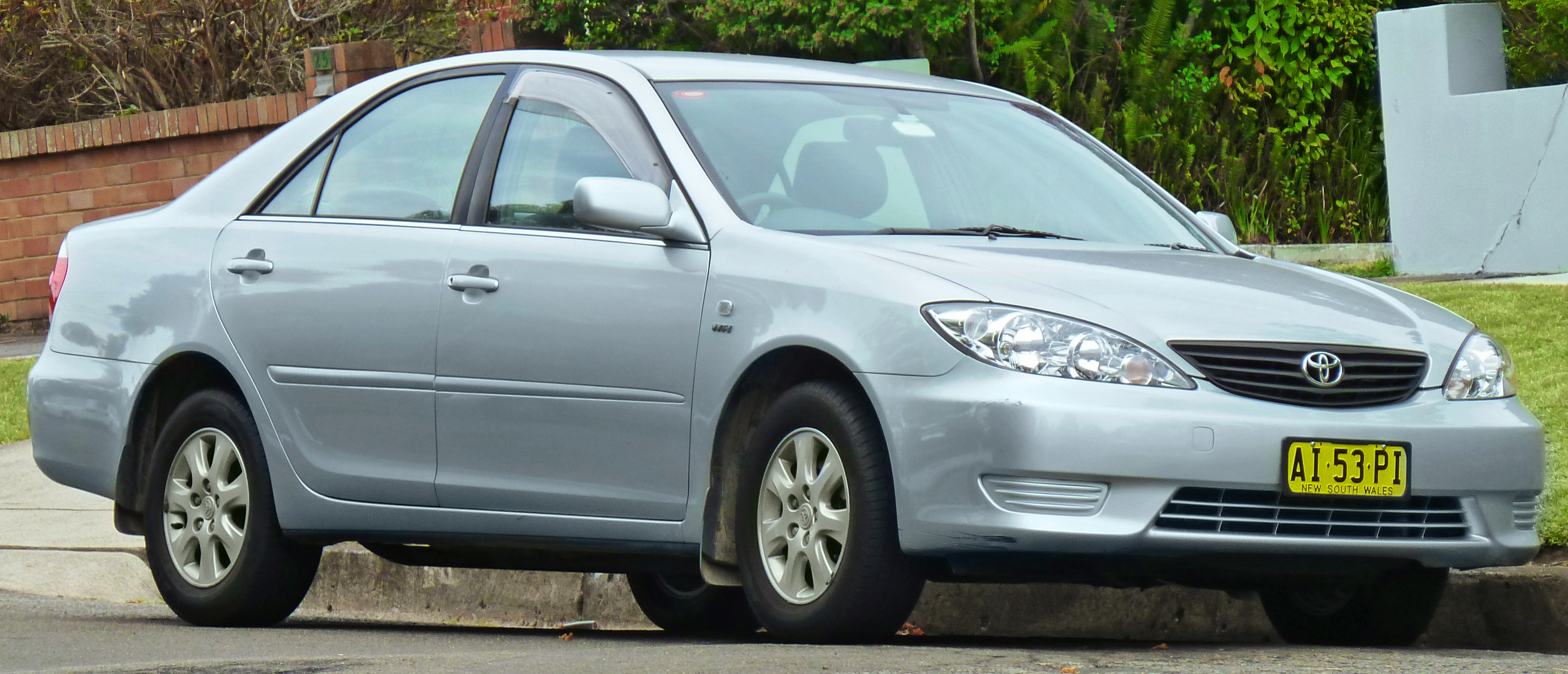
Camry (facelift)

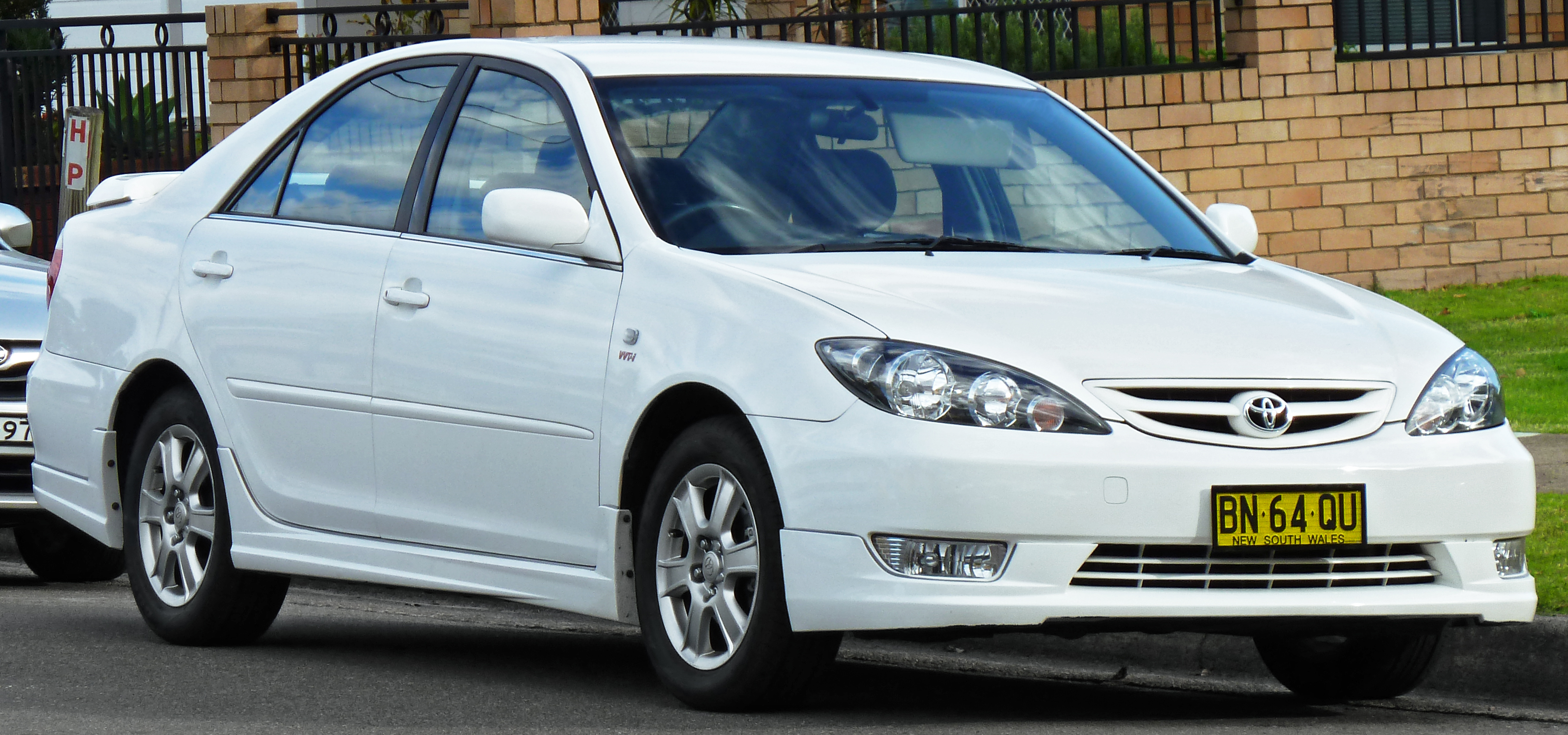
Camry Sportivo (facelift)

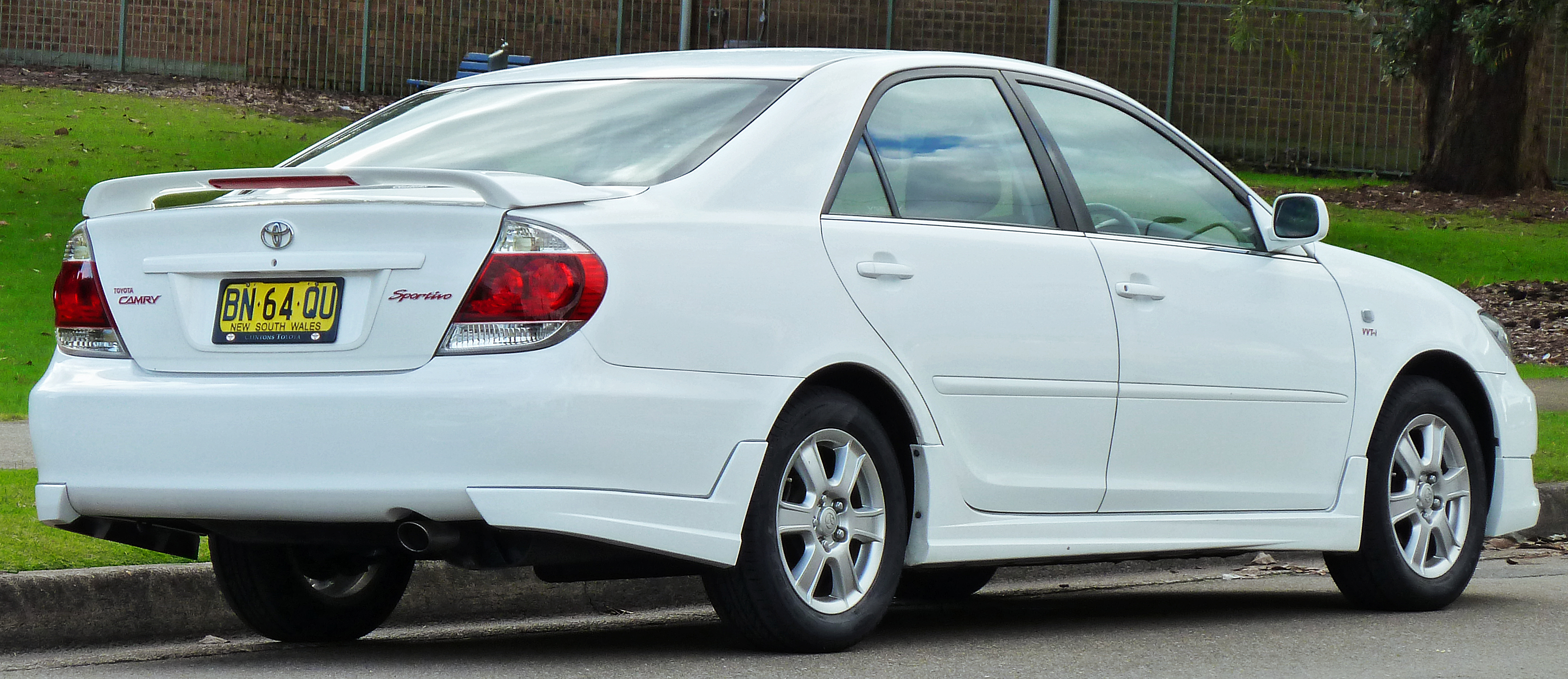
Camry Sportivo (facelift)

Prestige

Compared to the international version with a less conservative design (styled by Hiroyuki Metsugi, approved 1999), the Southeast Asian and Taiwanese "prestige" Camry had a different distinctive design with more chrome, larger head lamps and tail lamps and a general greater emphasis on its width.

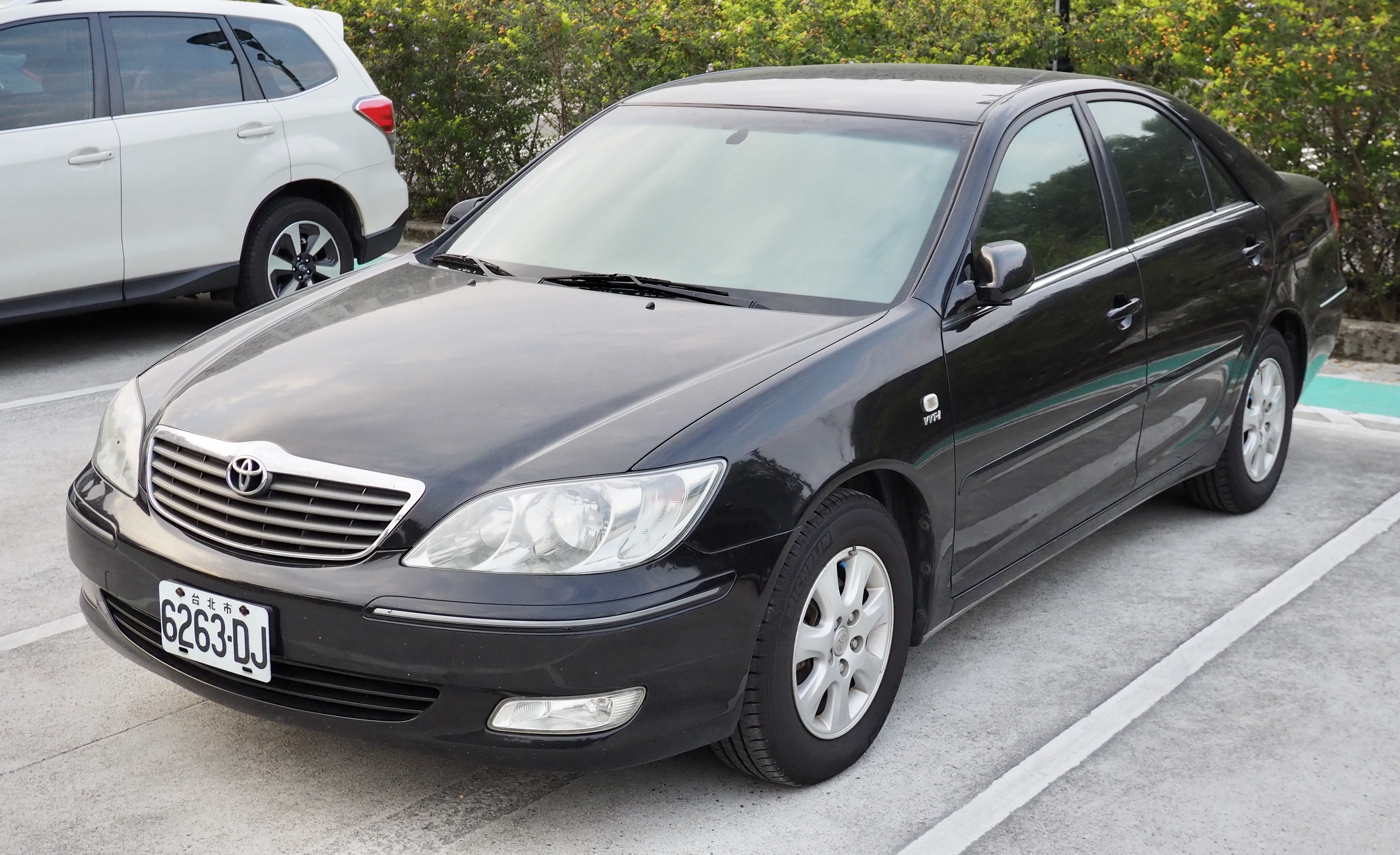
Prestige Camry (Southeast Asia/Taiwan; pre-facelift)

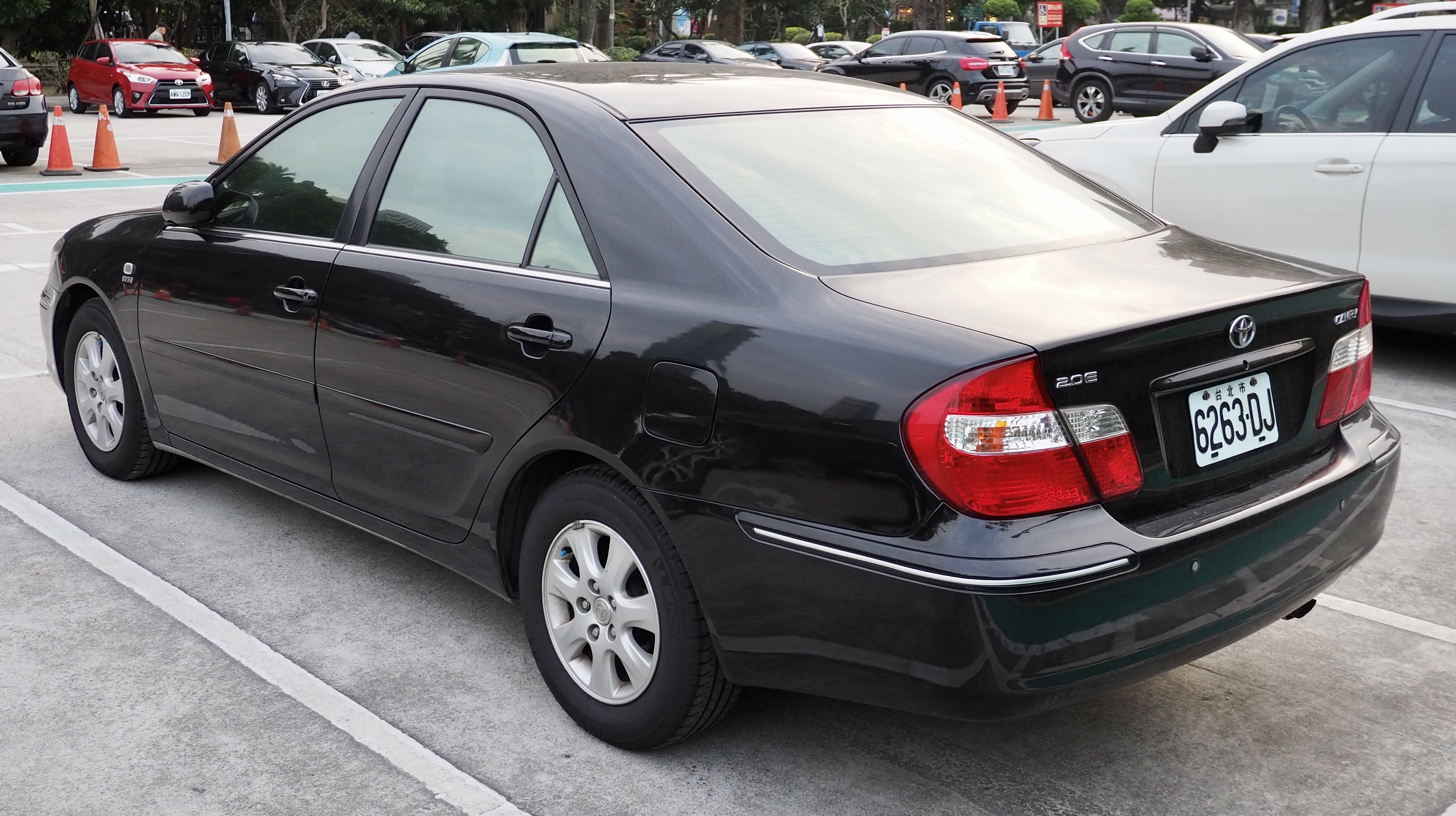
Prestige Camry (Southeast Asia/Taiwan; pre-facelift)

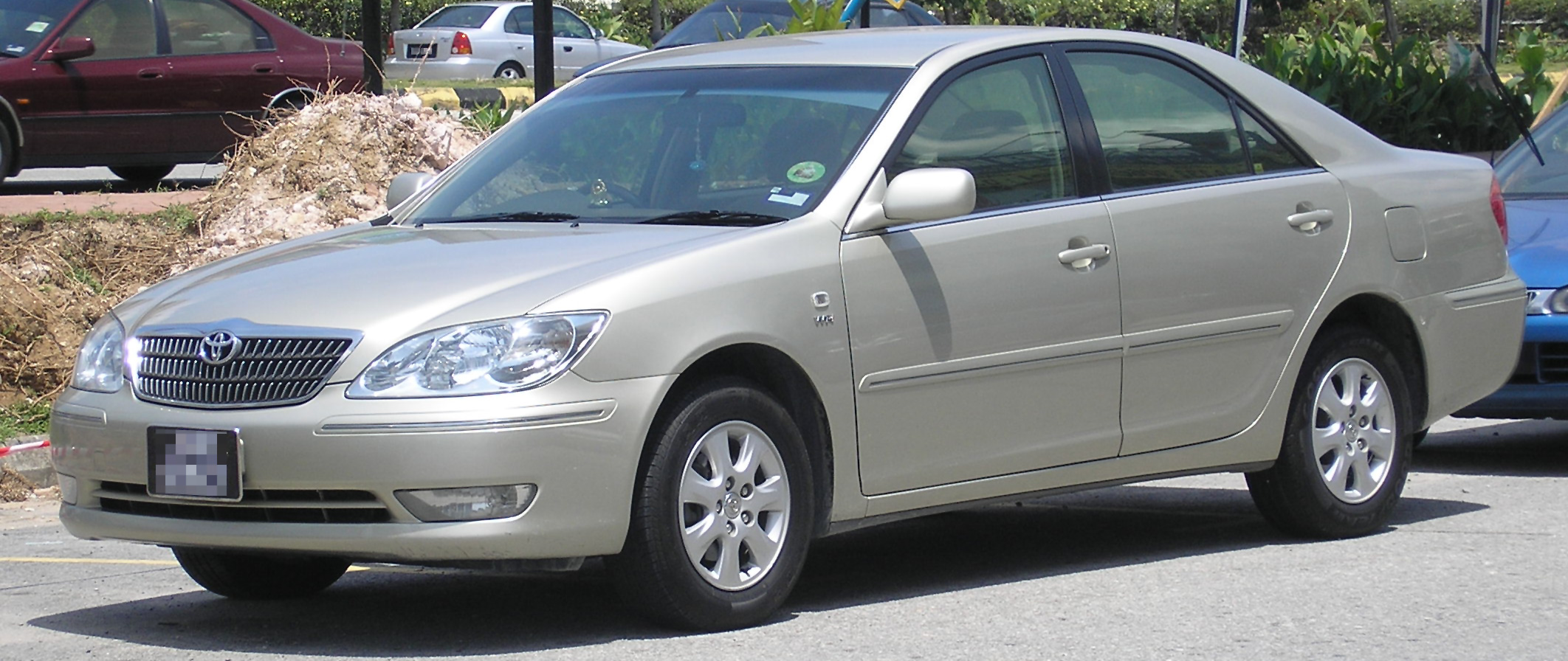
Prestige Camry (Southeast Asia/Taiwan; facelift)

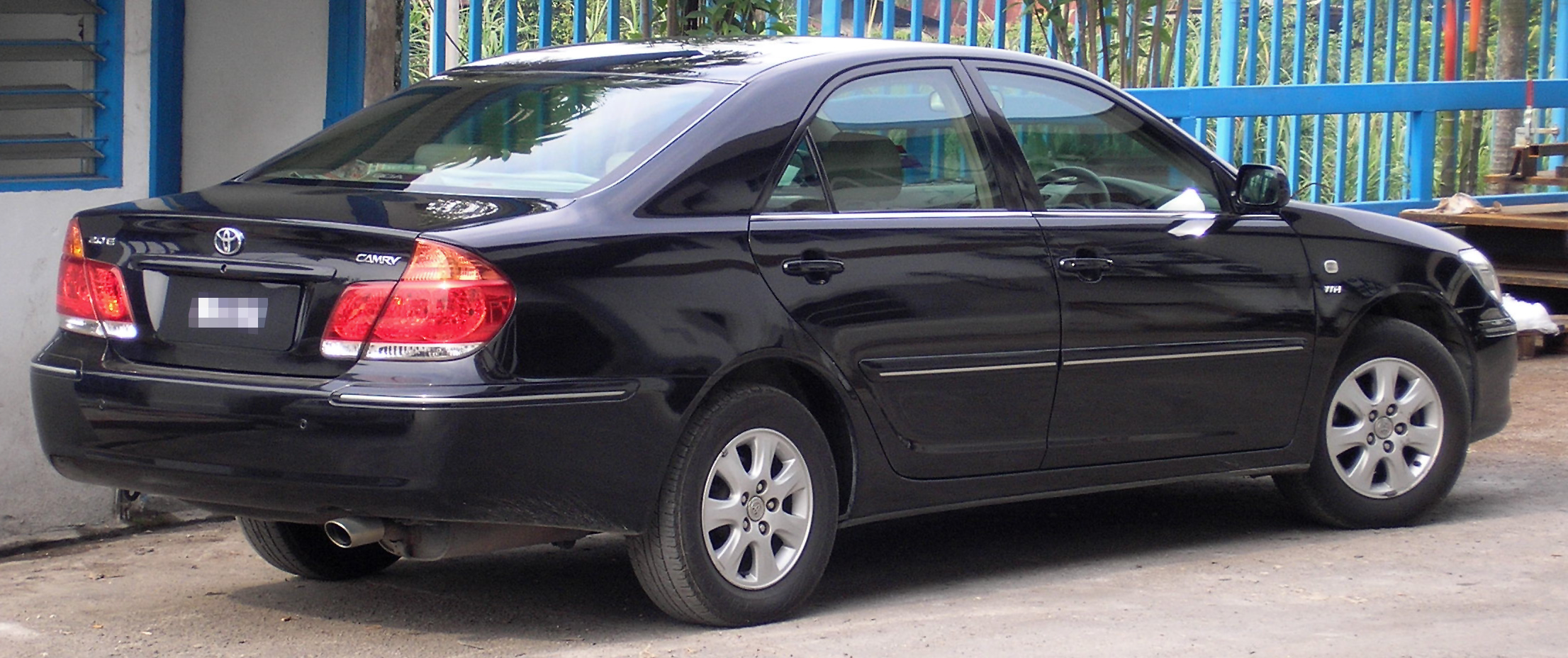
Prestige Camry (Southeast Asia/Taiwan; facelift)

=== XV40 (2006–2012) ===
XV40
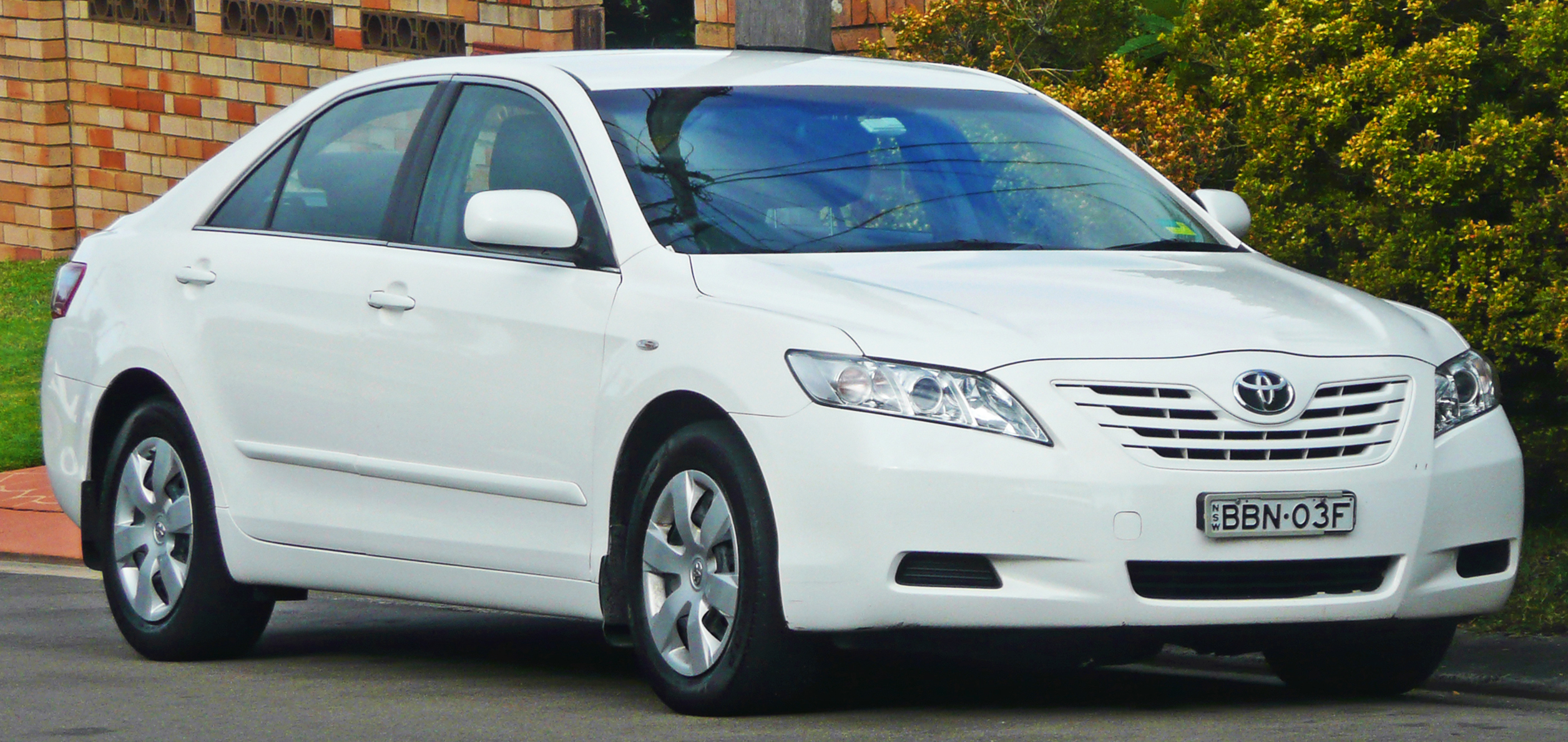
- Pre-facelift Camry (regular)

Overview
- Model code: XV40
- Also called: Daihatsu Altis (Japan)
- Production: 2006–2011 (regular); 2006–2012 (prestige)
- Model years: 2007–2011 (North America)

Body and chassis
- Body style: 4-door sedan
- Platform: Toyota K platform
- Related: Toyota Aurion (XV40)

Regular

This generation of Camry saw even greater differentiation between "regular" model sold internationally (including Japan) and the "prestige" Camry sold in the rest of Asia. The regular Camry, fitted with four-cylinder engines sold alongside the V6-engined prestige Camry in Oceania and the Middle East as the Toyota Aurion. Between 2006 and 2010, the regular Camry was also rebadged as the Daihatsu Altis model, which sold alongside the Camry in Japan. The Daihatsu differed only in badging, with no cosmetic changes.

The XV40 Camry was introduced at the 2006 North American International Auto Show alongside a hybrid version and went on sale in March 2006 for the 2007 model year.

Power comes from a choice of four and six-cylinder engines. The 2.4-liter 2AZ-FE I4 engine was carried over and produced 158 hp (118 kW). It came with a five-speed manual or five-speed automatic transmission. The 3.5-liter 2GR-FE V6 in contrast came with a new six-speed automatic and produced 268 hp (200 kW).

The Camry was facelifted in early 2009 for the 2010 model year with a redesigned fascia, taillights, and an all-new 2.5-liter 2AR-FE four-cylinder engine with a new six-speed automatic transmission. The 2.5-liter engine produces 169 hp (126 kW) for the base, LE, XLE models, and 179 hp (133 kW) for the SE. Power locks, stability control, traction control and tires (205–225 mm or 8.1–8.9 in) were also made standard for 2010. A six speed manual transmission was available on the base model.

The XV40 series Camry is the first in which the Camry has been available as a gasoline/electric hybrid. The Camry Hybrid uses Toyota's second-generation Hybrid Synergy Drive (HSD) and a 2AZ-FXE four-cylinder with 110 kW (148 hp) in conjunction with a 30 kW (40 hp) electric motor for a combined output of 140 kW (188 hp).

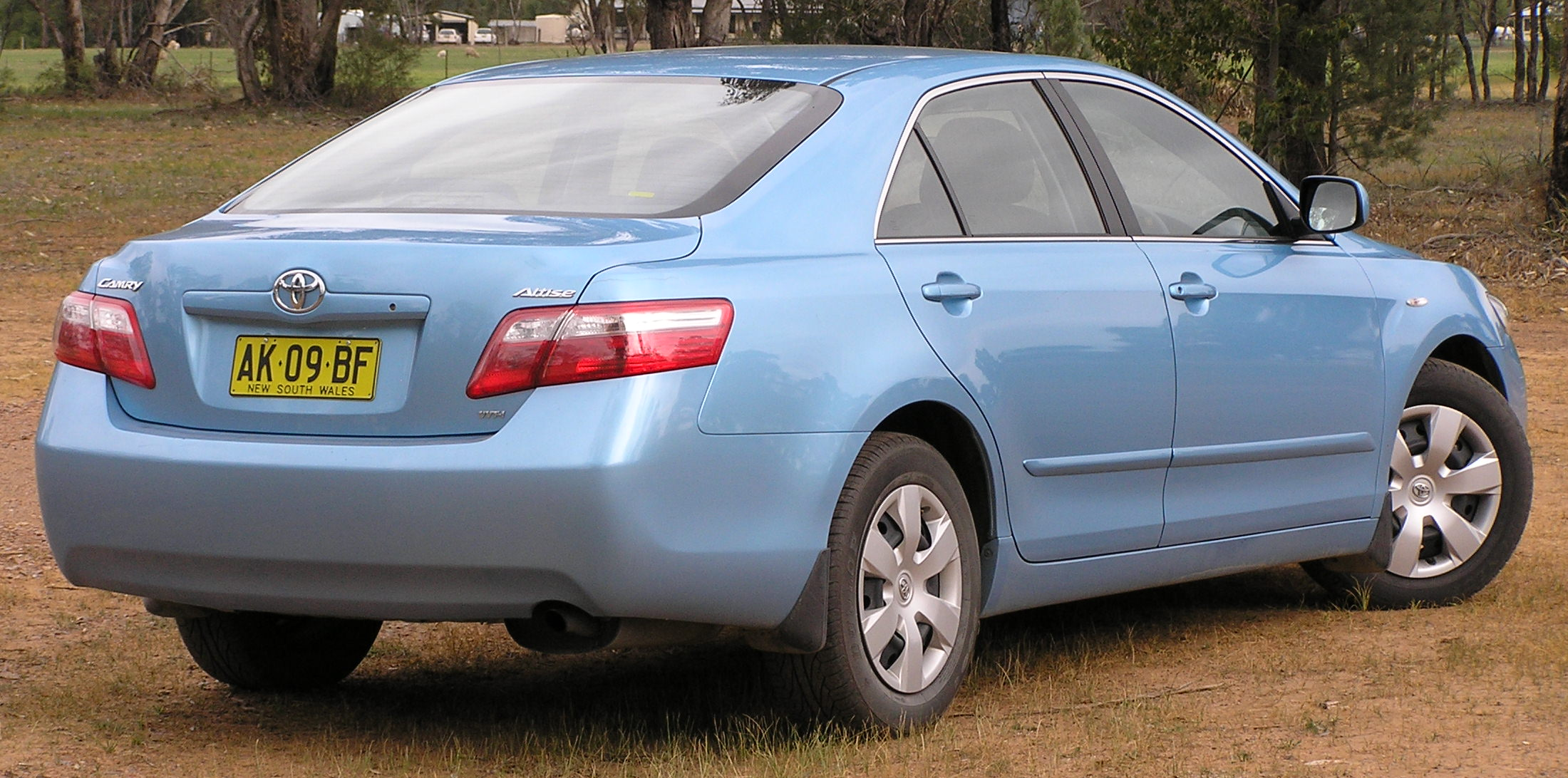
Camry (pre-facelift)

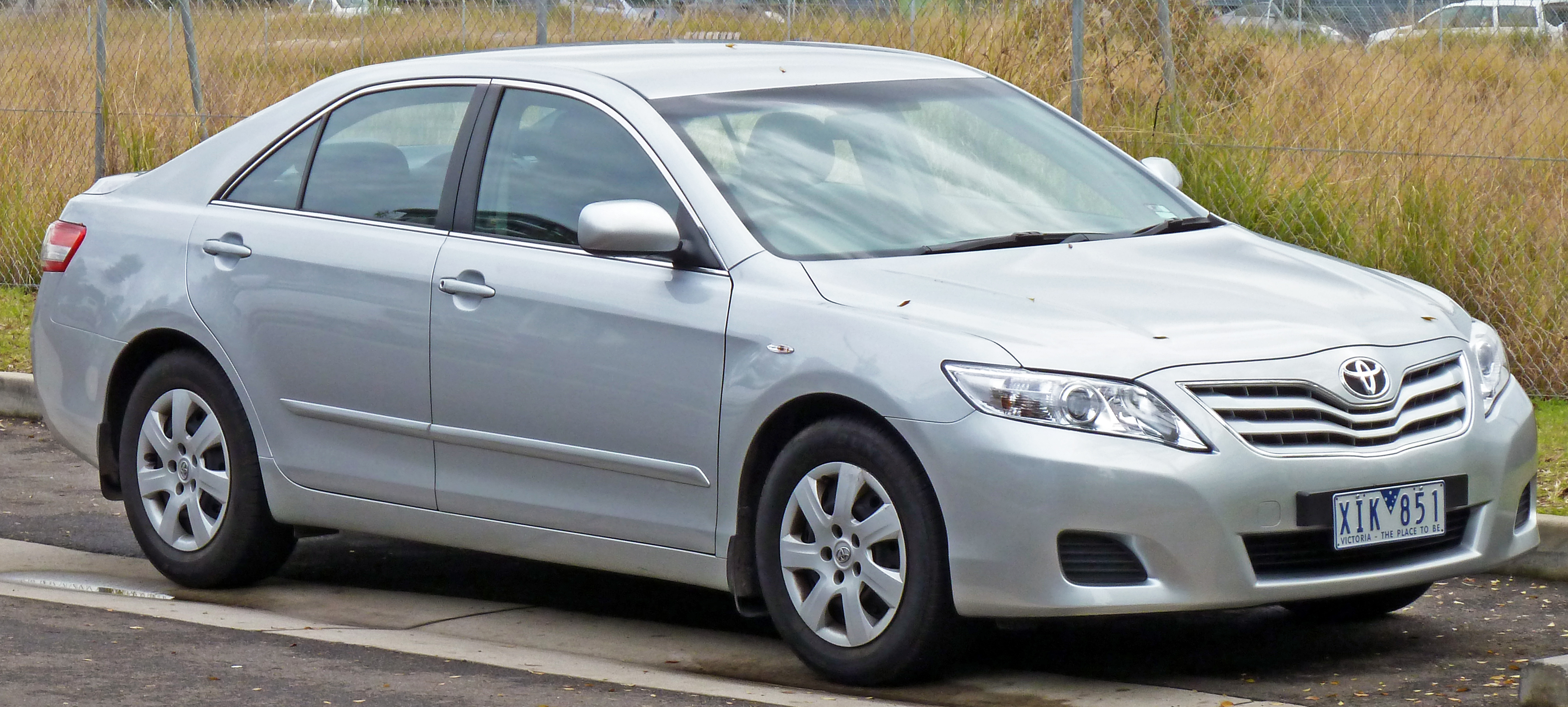
Camry (facelift)

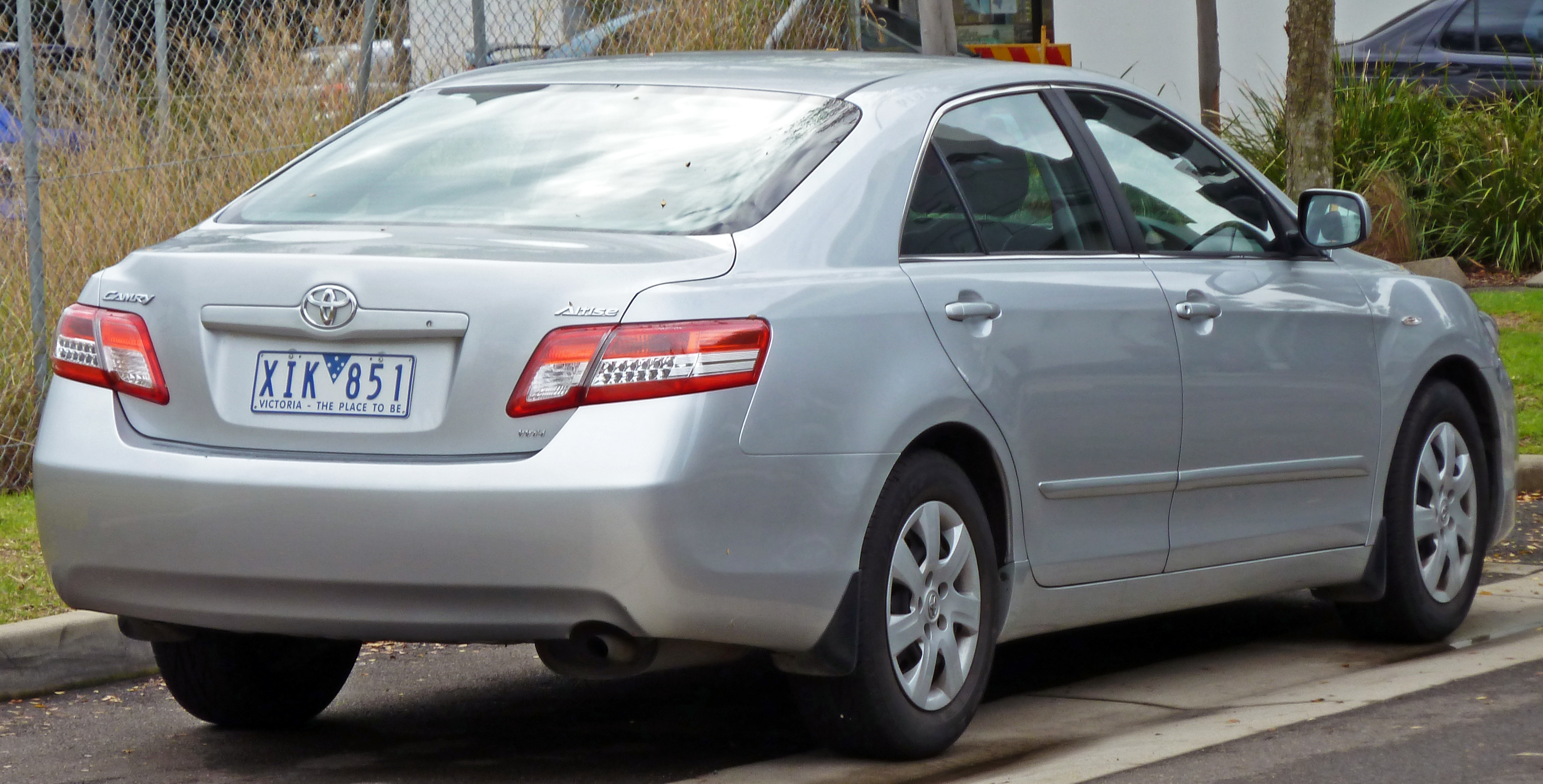
Camry (facelift)

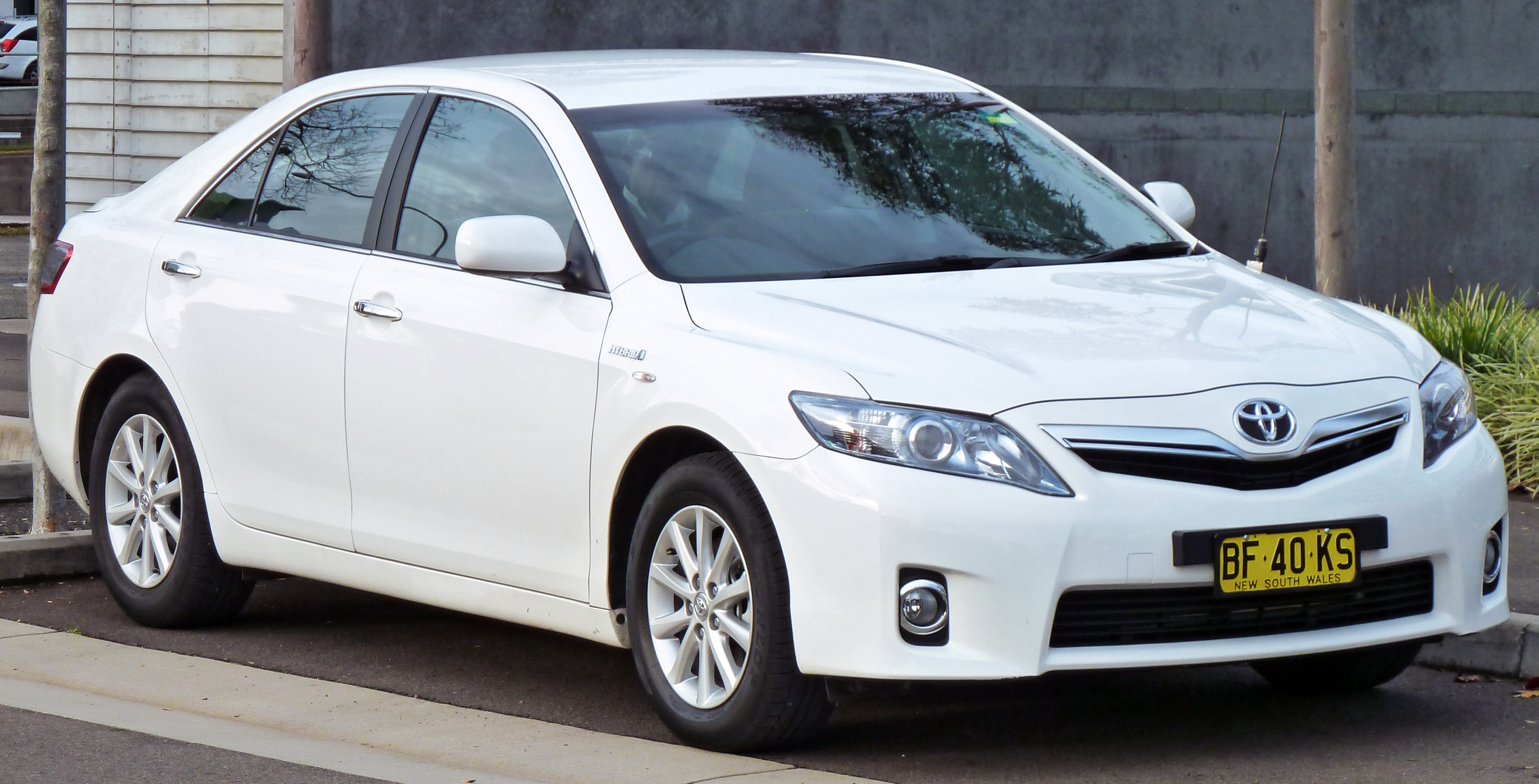
Camry Hybrid (facelift)

Prestige

The Asian market Camry features different front and rear styling, plus a revised interior. In Asia, the Camry occupied a higher end of the market, priced just below entry-level German luxury models. The Asian Camry lineup includes a 3.5-liter V6 model and is sold as the Toyota Aurion (XV40) in Australia, competing against large Australian sedans like the Ford Falcon and Holden Commodore.

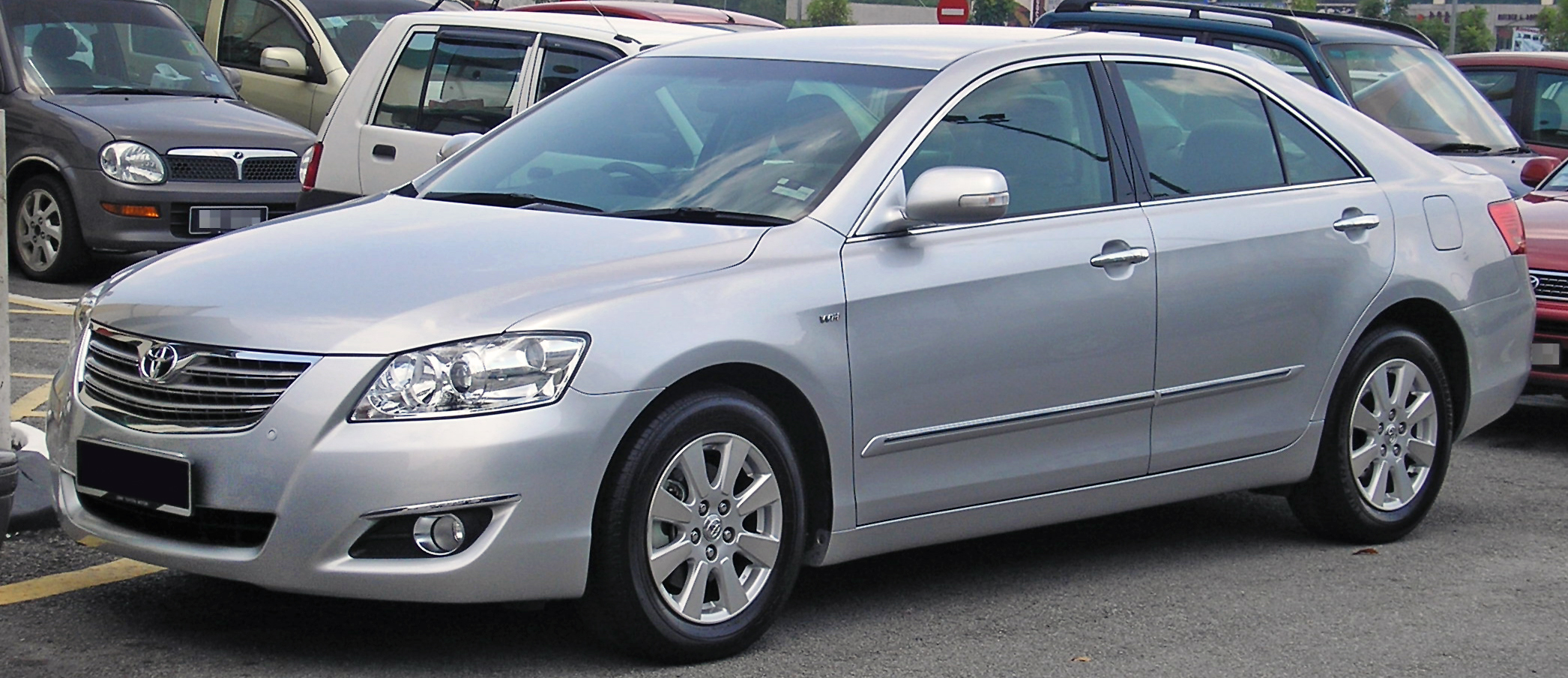
Prestige Camry (pre-facelift)

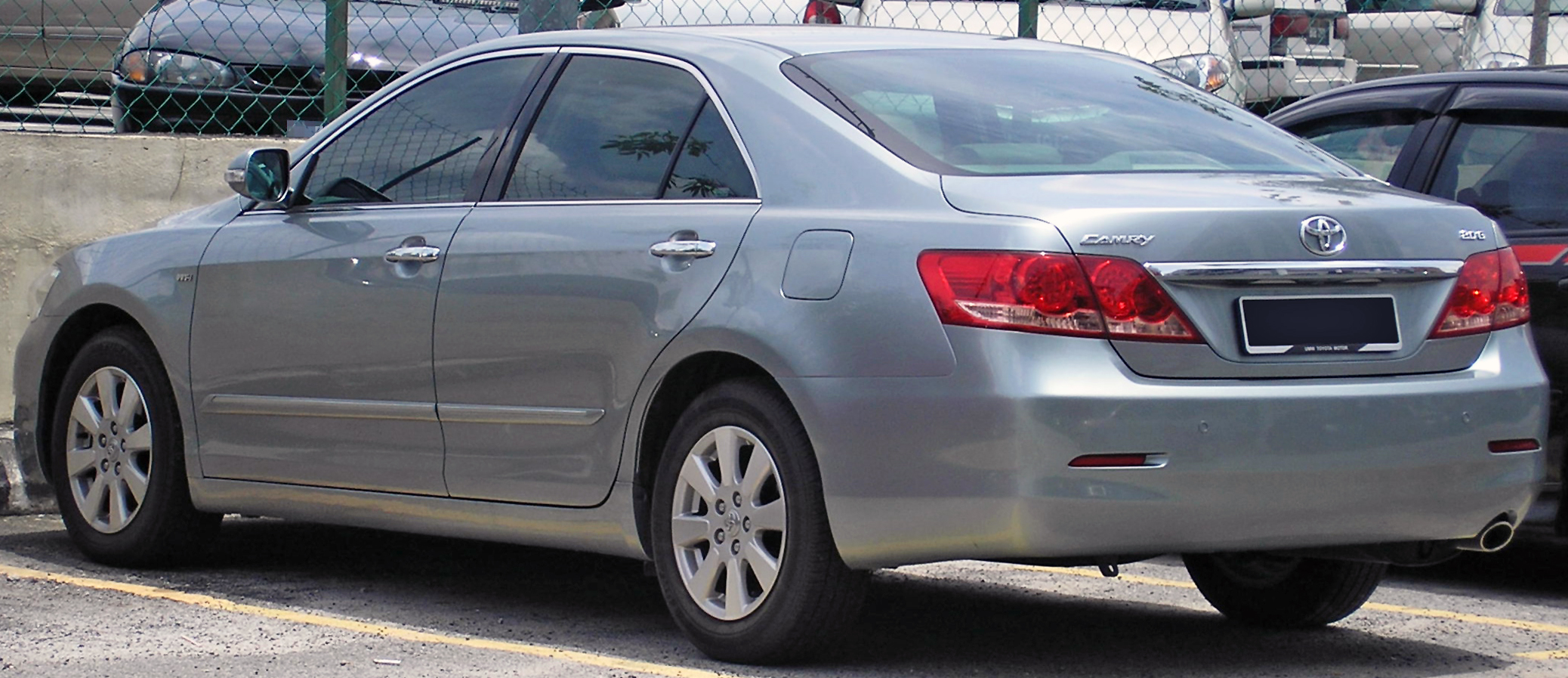
Prestige Camry (pre-facelift)

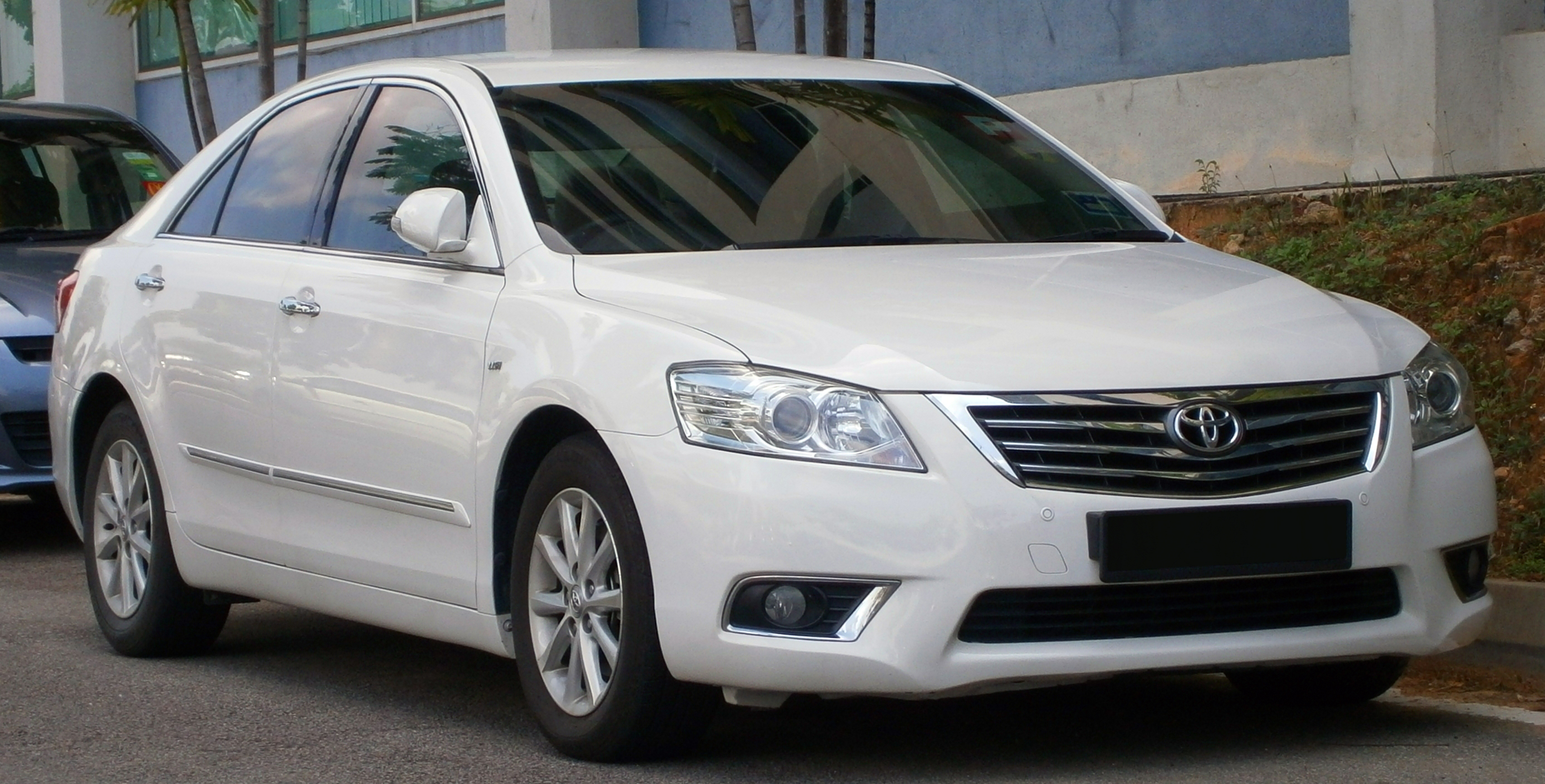
Prestige Camry (facelift)

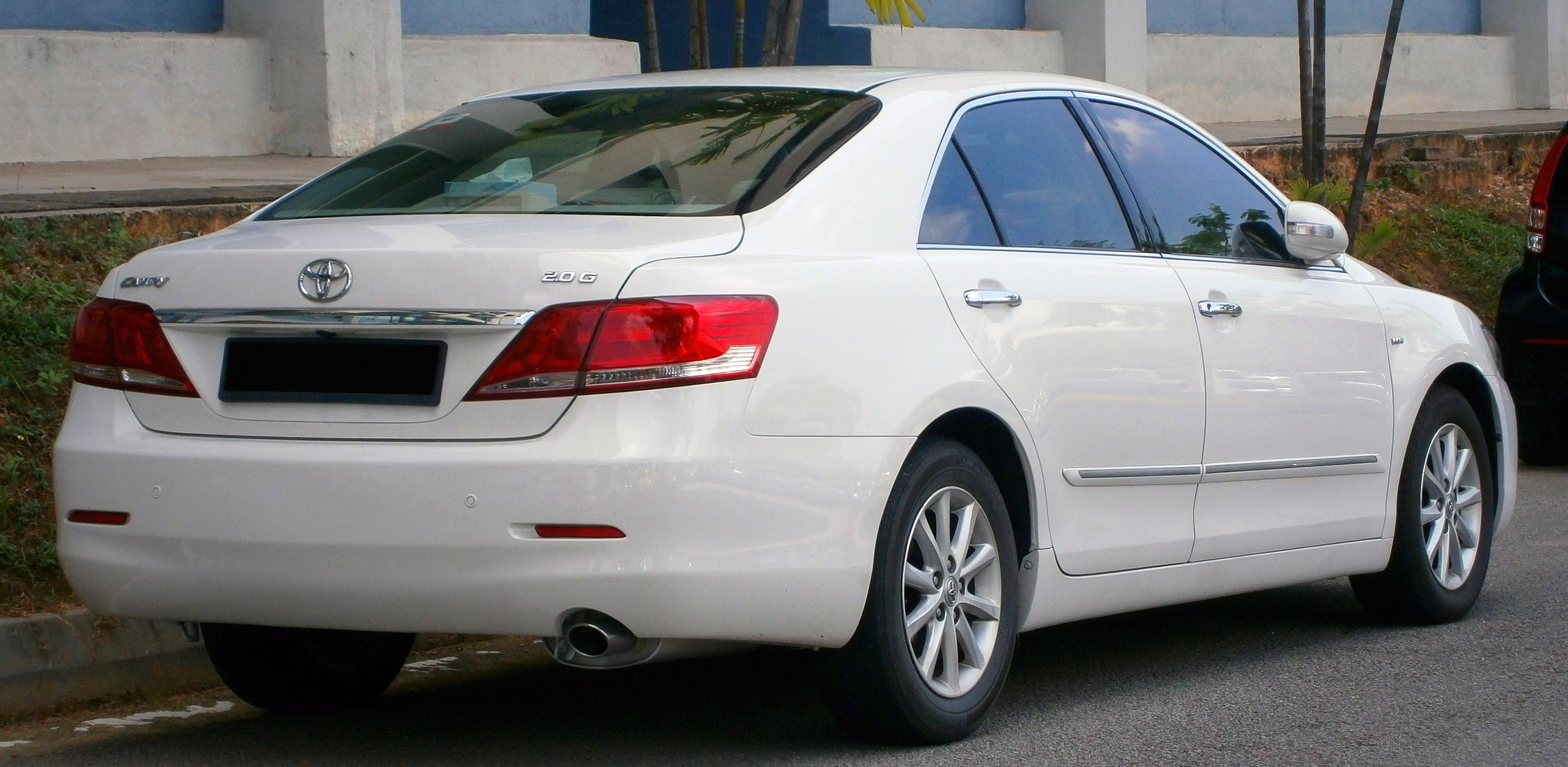
Prestige Camry (facelift)

=== XV50 (2011–2019) ===
XV50
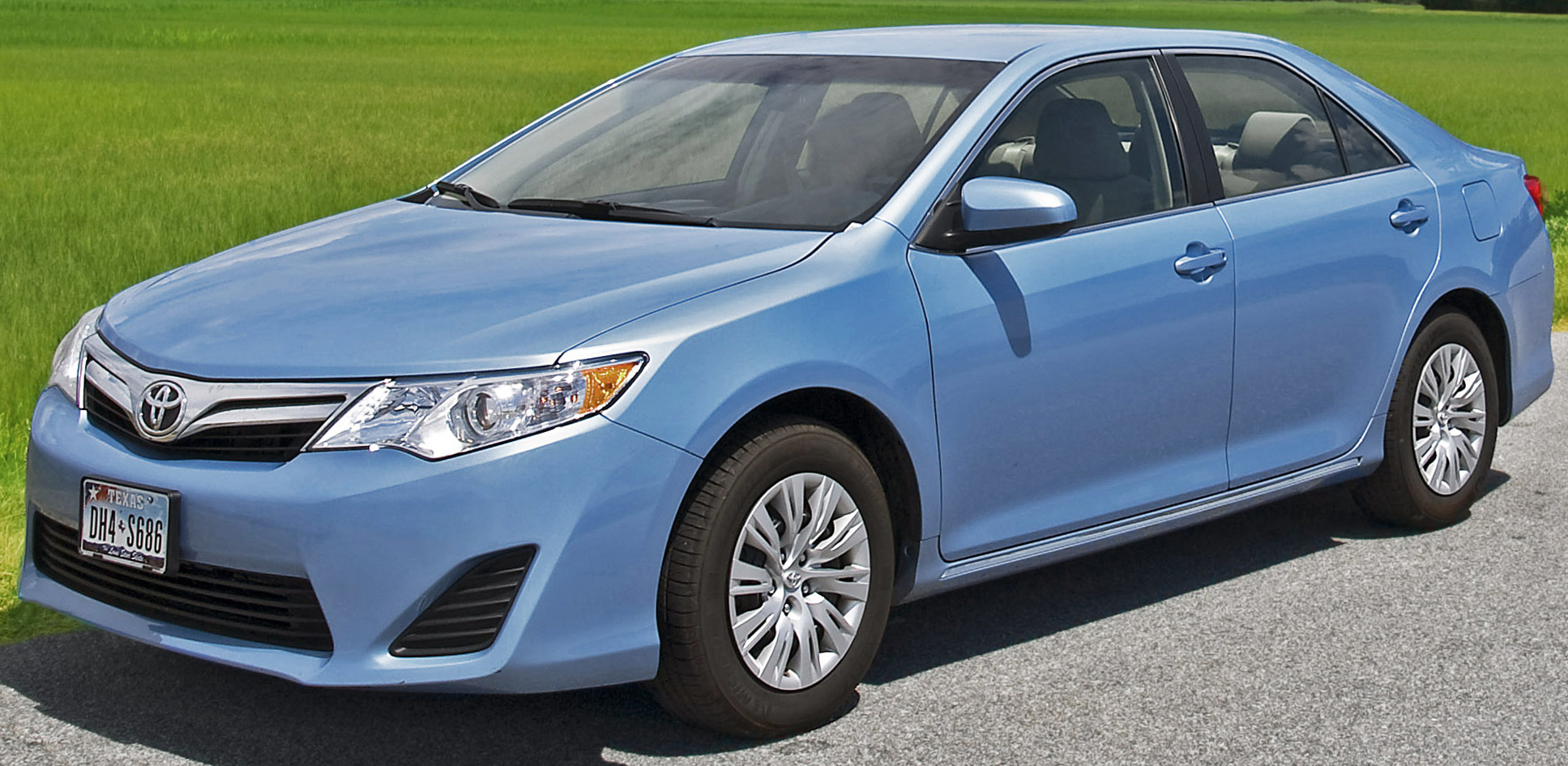
- Pre-facelift Camry (regular)

Overview
- Model code: XV50
- Also called: Daihatsu Altis (Japan; 2012–2017); Toyota Aurion (Australia; 2012–2017)
- Production: August 2011 – October 2017 (regular); August 2011 – March 2019 (prestige)
- Model years: 2012–2017

Body and chassis
- Body style: 4-door sedan
- Platform: Toyota K platform

Regular

The XV50 Camry was produced from 21 August 2011, introduced on 23 August 2011, and began U.S. sales in September 2011. The interior received a major restyling, while the exterior received all-new sheet metal and more angular styling.

The US Camry carried over three different engine choices from the previous model. Starting with a 2.5-liter four-cylinder hybrid model rated at 149 kW (200 hp), a 2.5-liter four-cylinder gasoline engine rated at 133 kW (178 hp) and 230 N⋅m (170 lb⋅ft), and a 3.5-liter V6 rated at 200 kW (268 hp) and 336 N⋅m (248 lb⋅ft). Power output has been increased mostly by switching to electro-hydraulic power steering. The trim levels include the L, LE, SE, XLE, SE V6, XLE V6, Hybrid LE, Hybrid XLE and for 2014 a Hybrid SE model. All models except for the hybrids are standard with six-speed automatic transmissions. For the first time, the manual transmission was not available. Hybrids are equipped with an eCVT transmission. The SE model gets paddle shifters, and a stiffer suspension. The new model has increased fuel economy due to lighter weight, a sleeker body, and low rolling-resistance tires.

A major facelift released to North America in April 2014 for the 2015 model year updated most of the exterior panels.

The US-built Toyota Camry took the top spot in 2015 and 2016 as the most American-made car with over 75 percent of its parts and manufacturing coming from the United States.

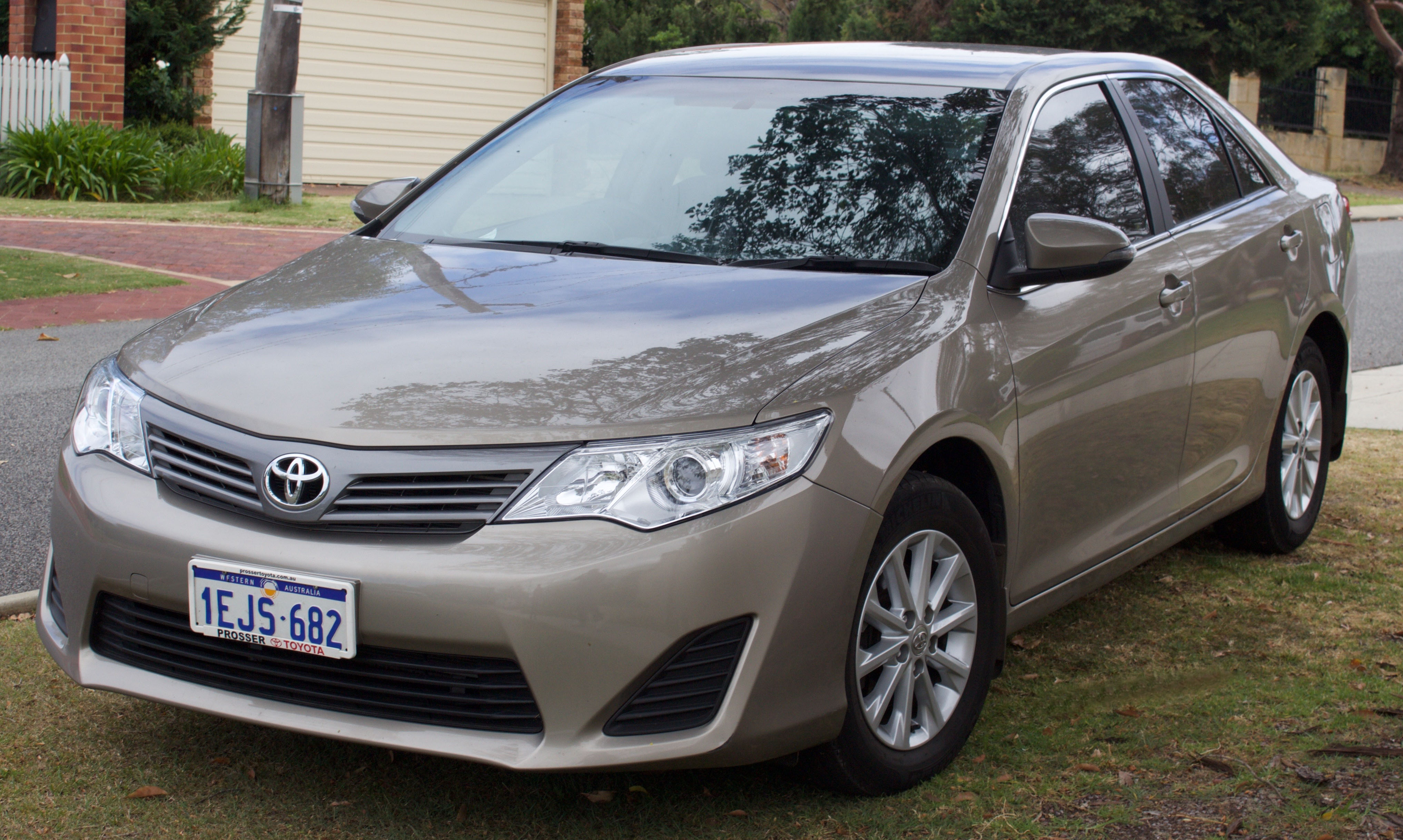
Camry Altise (pre-facelift)

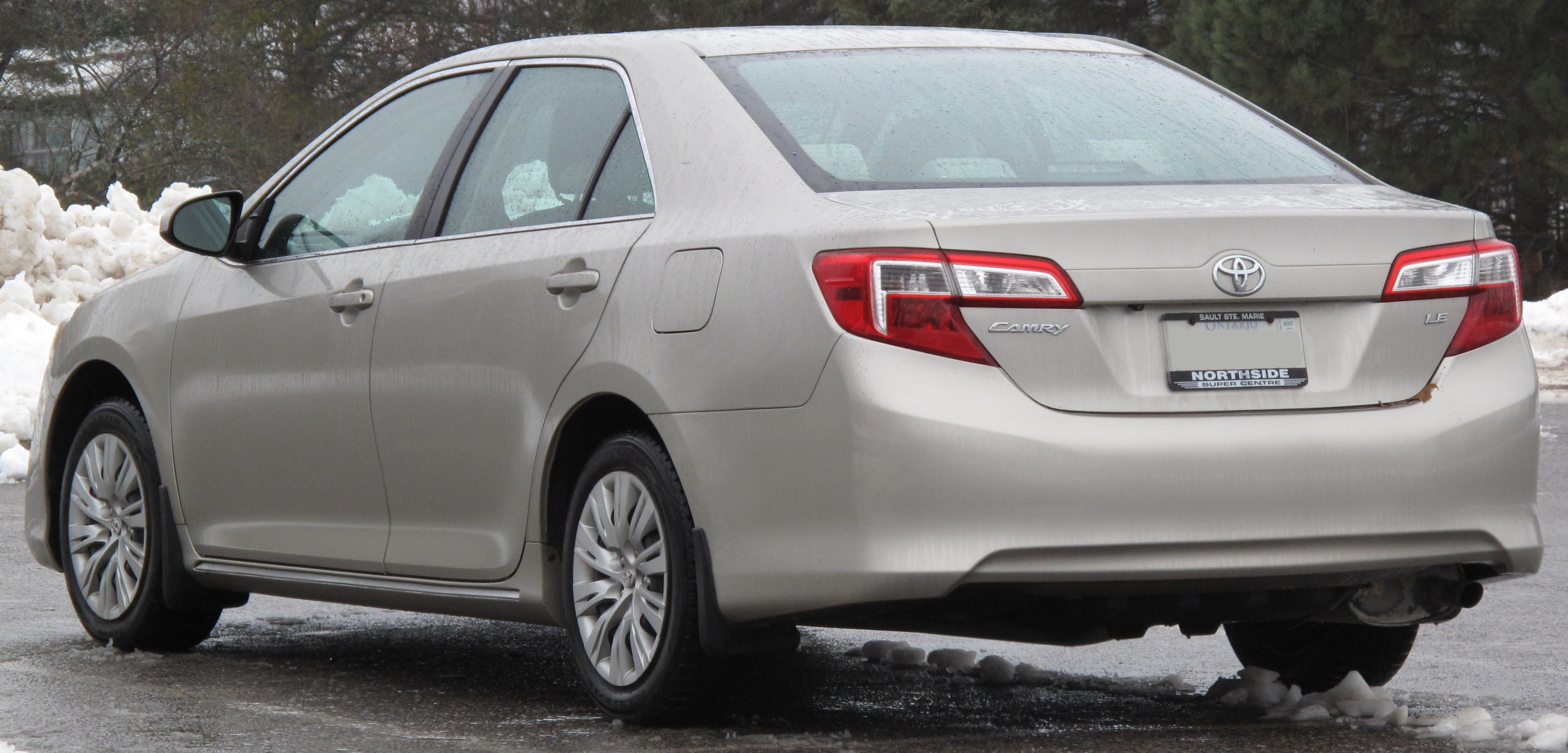
Camry LE (pre-facelift)

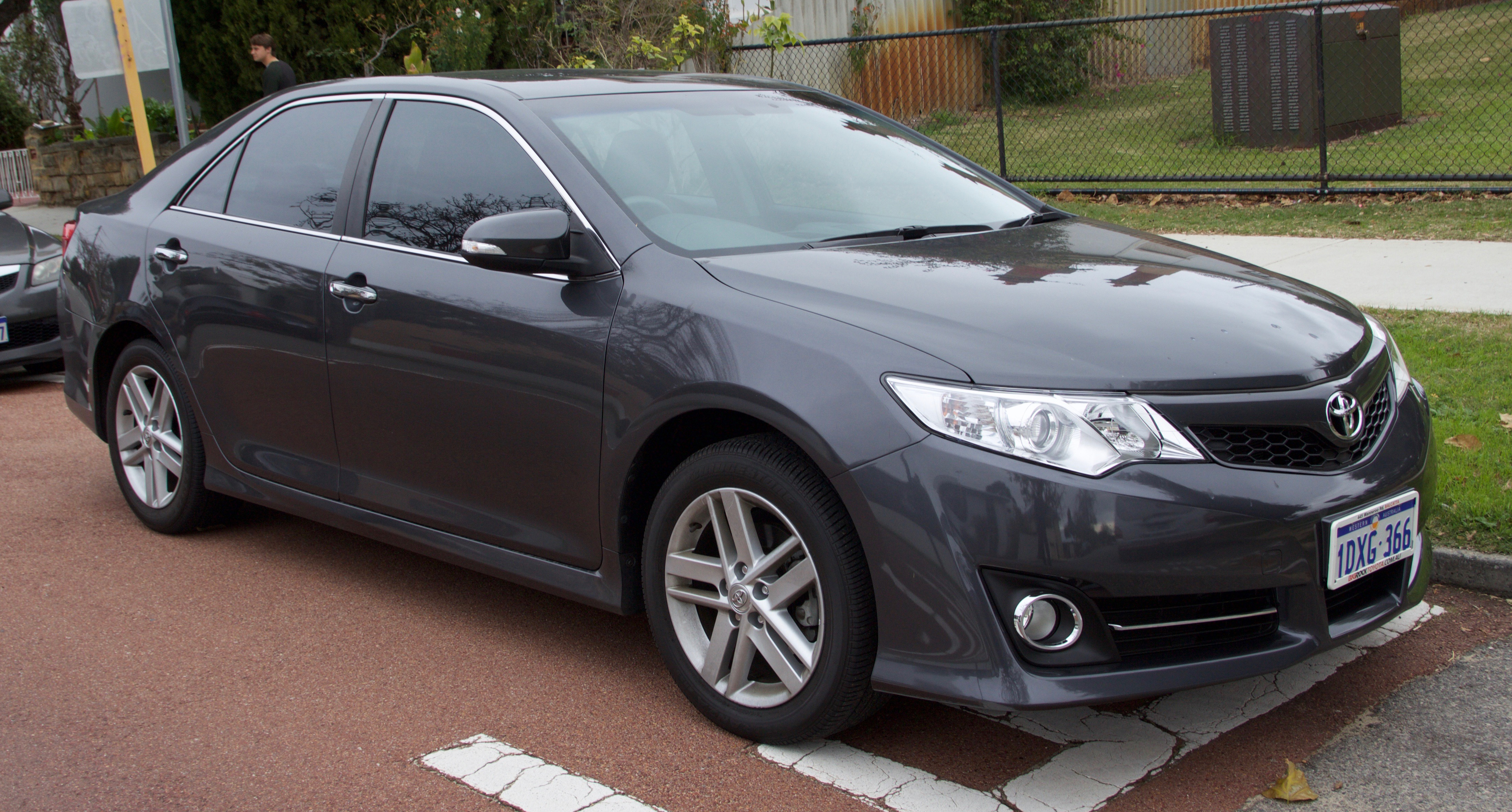
Camry Atara/SE (pre-facelift)

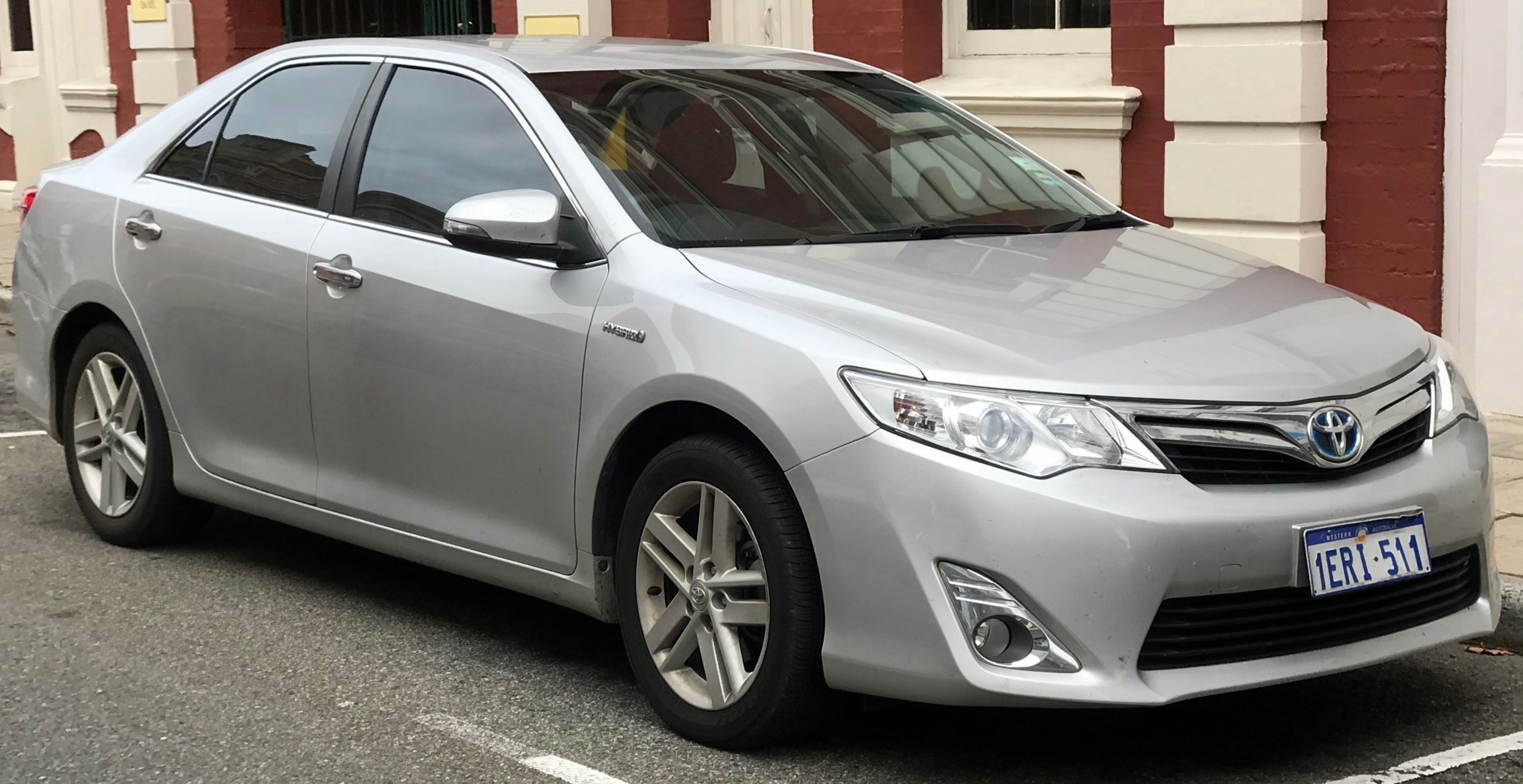
Camry Hybrid (pre-facelift)

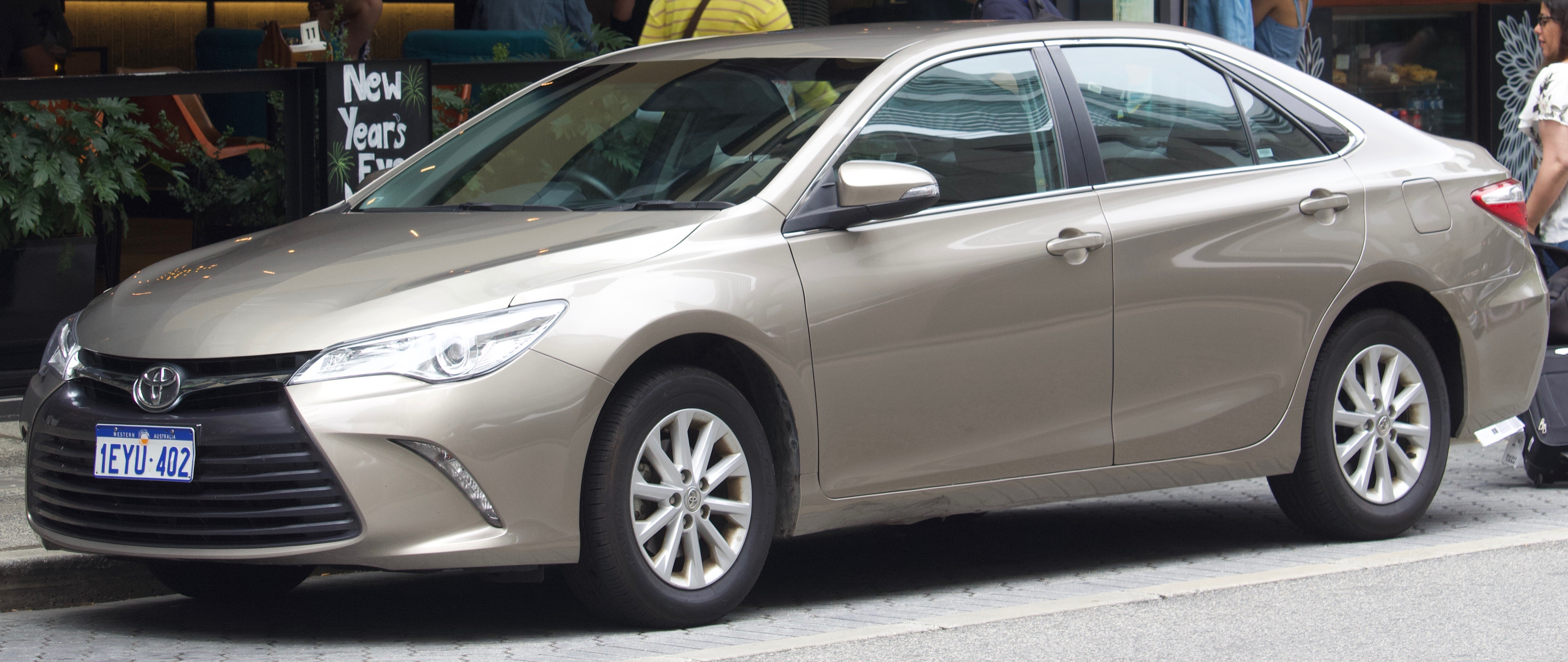
Camry Altise (facelift)

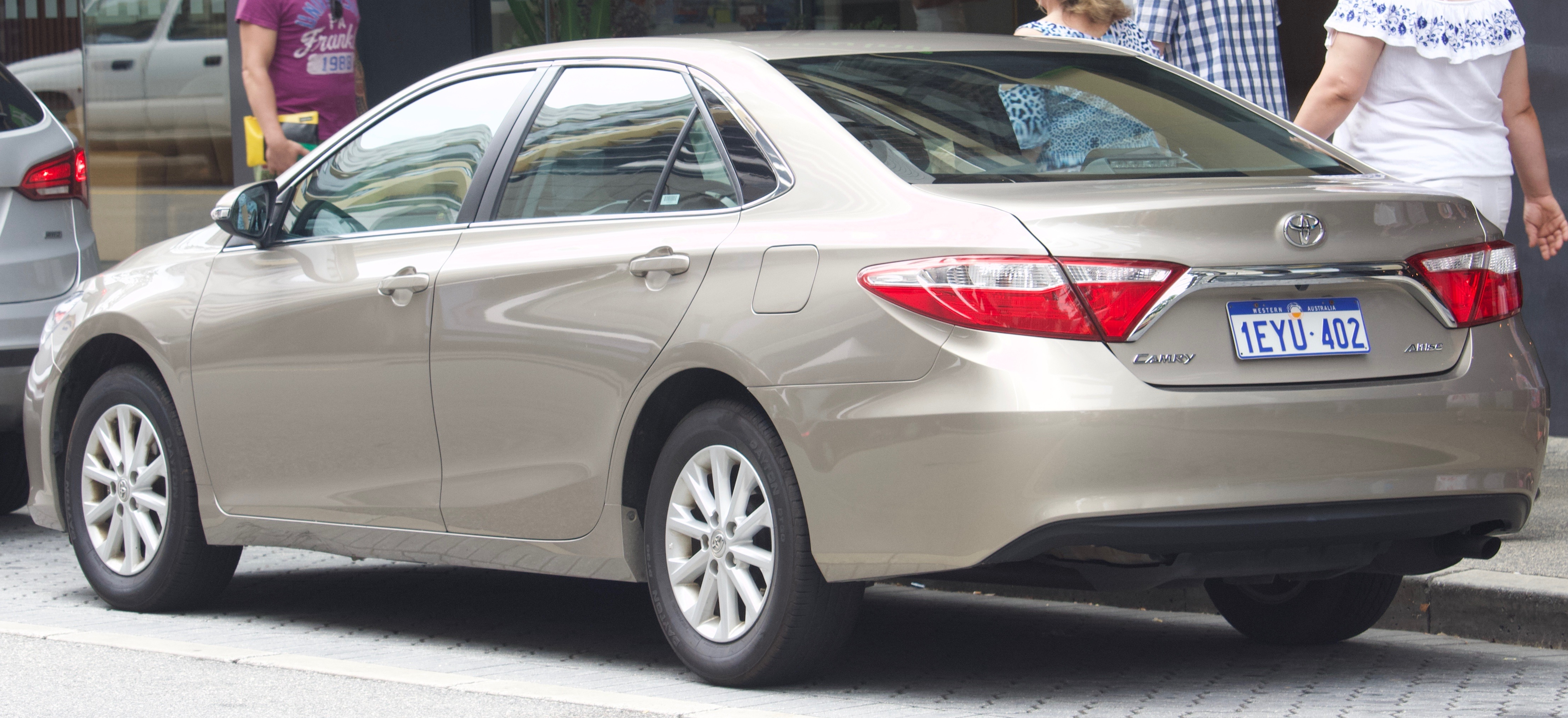
Camry Altise (facelift)

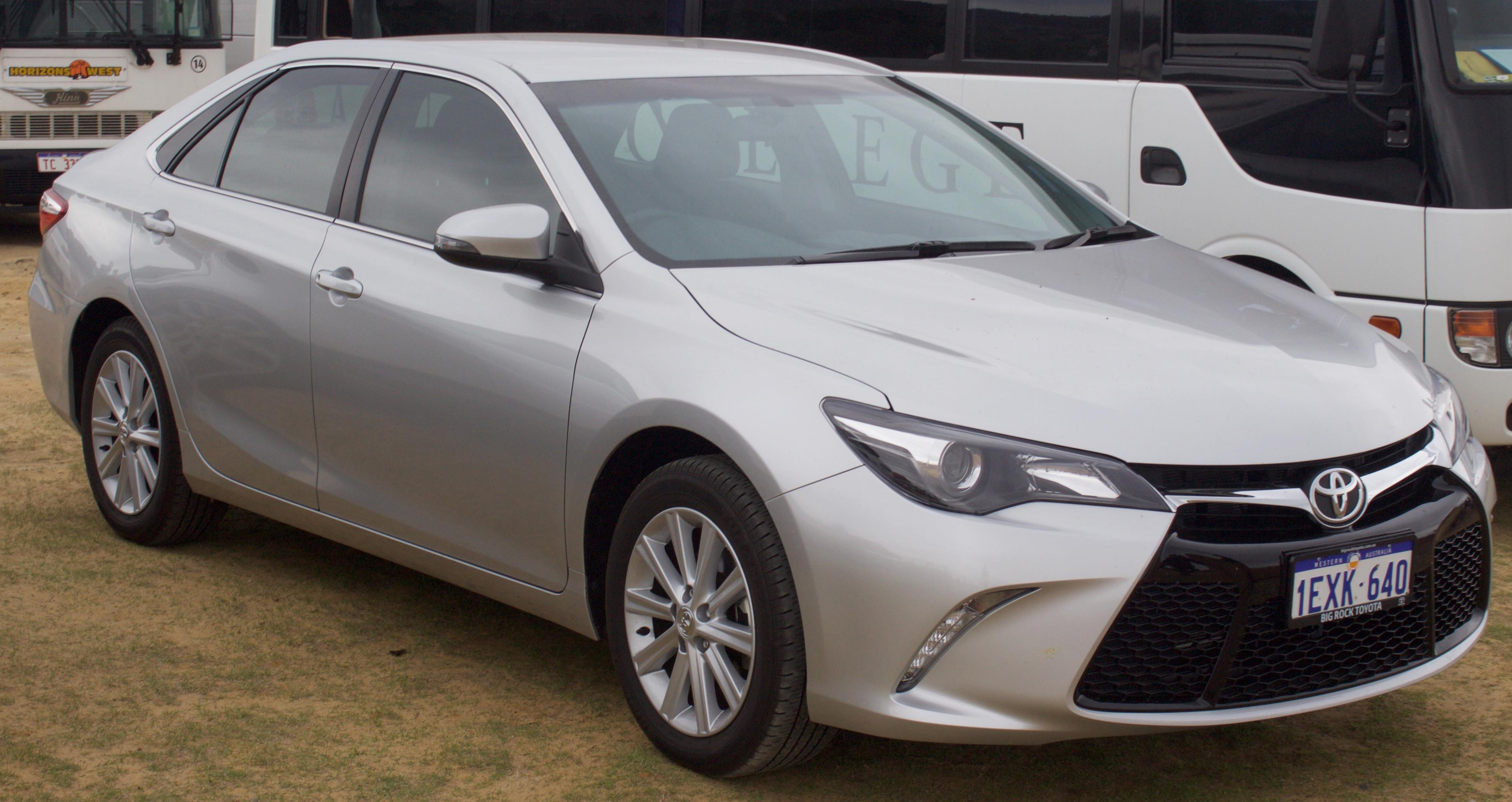
Camry Atara/SE (facelift)

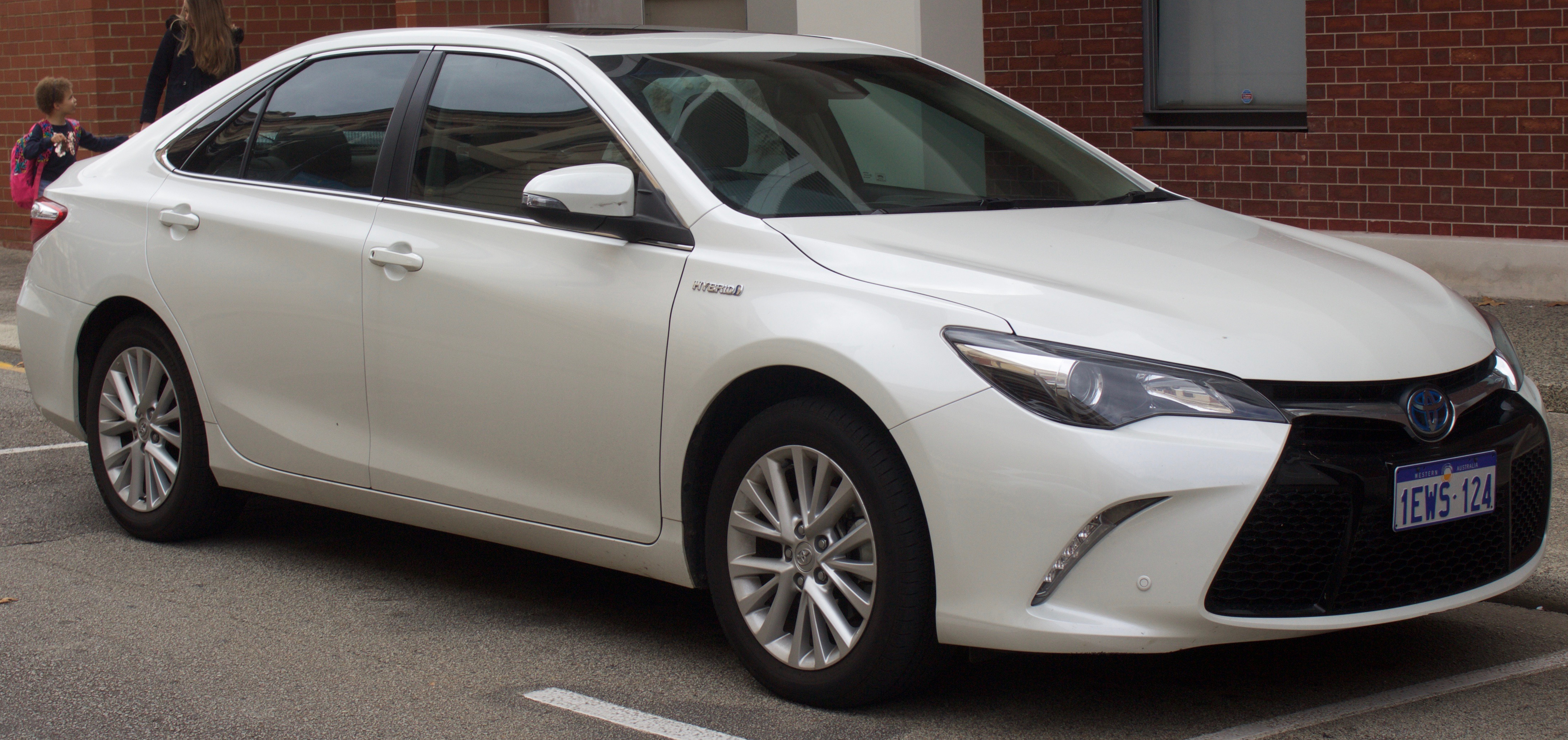
Camry Hybrid Atara/SE (facelift)

Prestige

In this generation, the Camry line-up for the Japanese domestic market was reduced to being just a single variant (hybrid only). The Japanese market will now share the same Camry model as the Asian market "prestige" Camry—a design also adopted by the Toyota Aurion (XV50), albeit with minor visual changes. The Brazilian market also carries the Prestige variant instead of the one sold in North America (only in the 3.5L V6 configuration). Prior to the XV50, the Japanese and Brazilian markets wide-body Camry were similar to the US models. The "prestige" Camry was discontinued in Southeast Asia and India in late 2018, but continued to be sold in Vietnam until April 2019.

The OEM rebadged version called the Daihatsu Altis was released in May 2012.

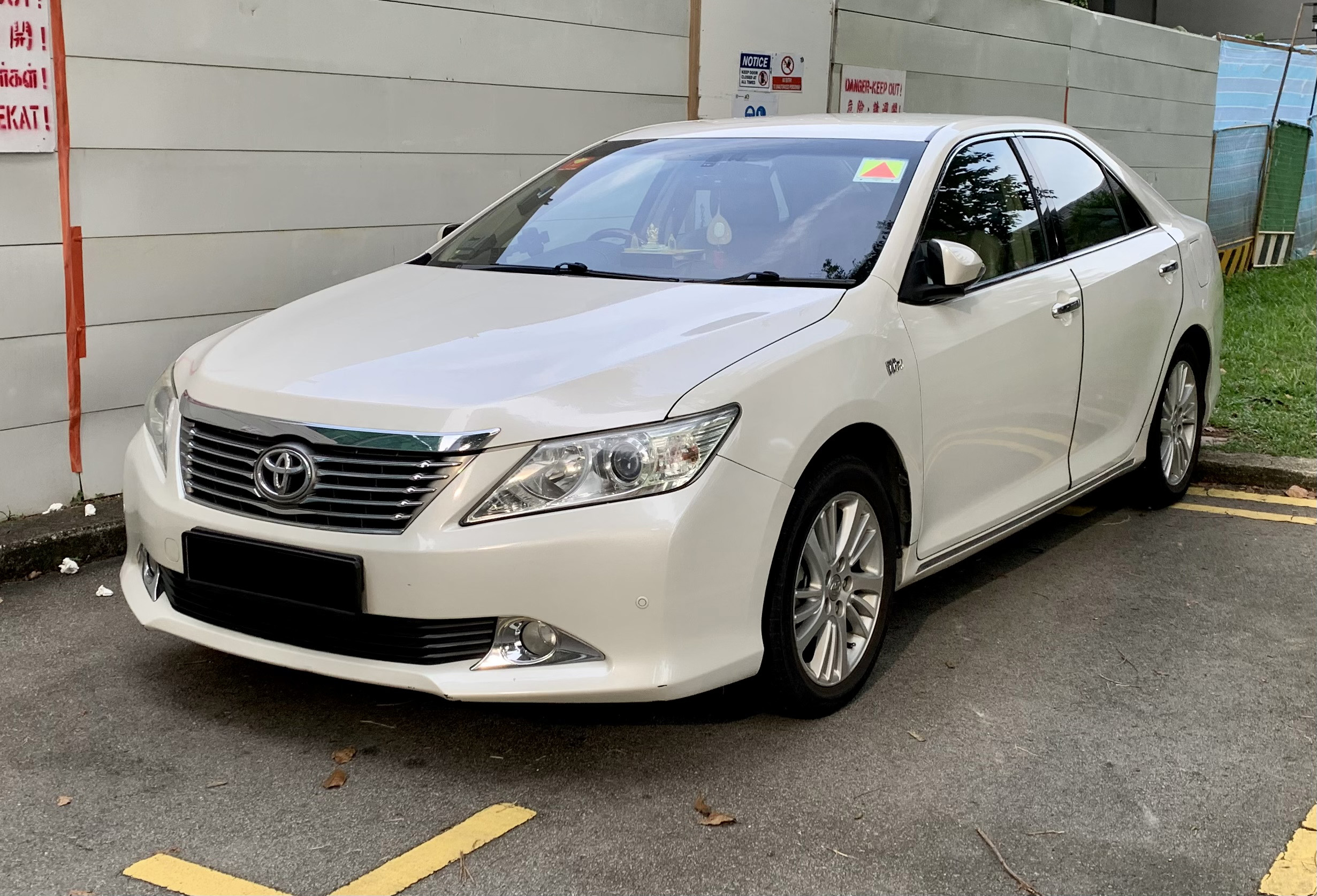
Prestige Camry (pre-facelift)

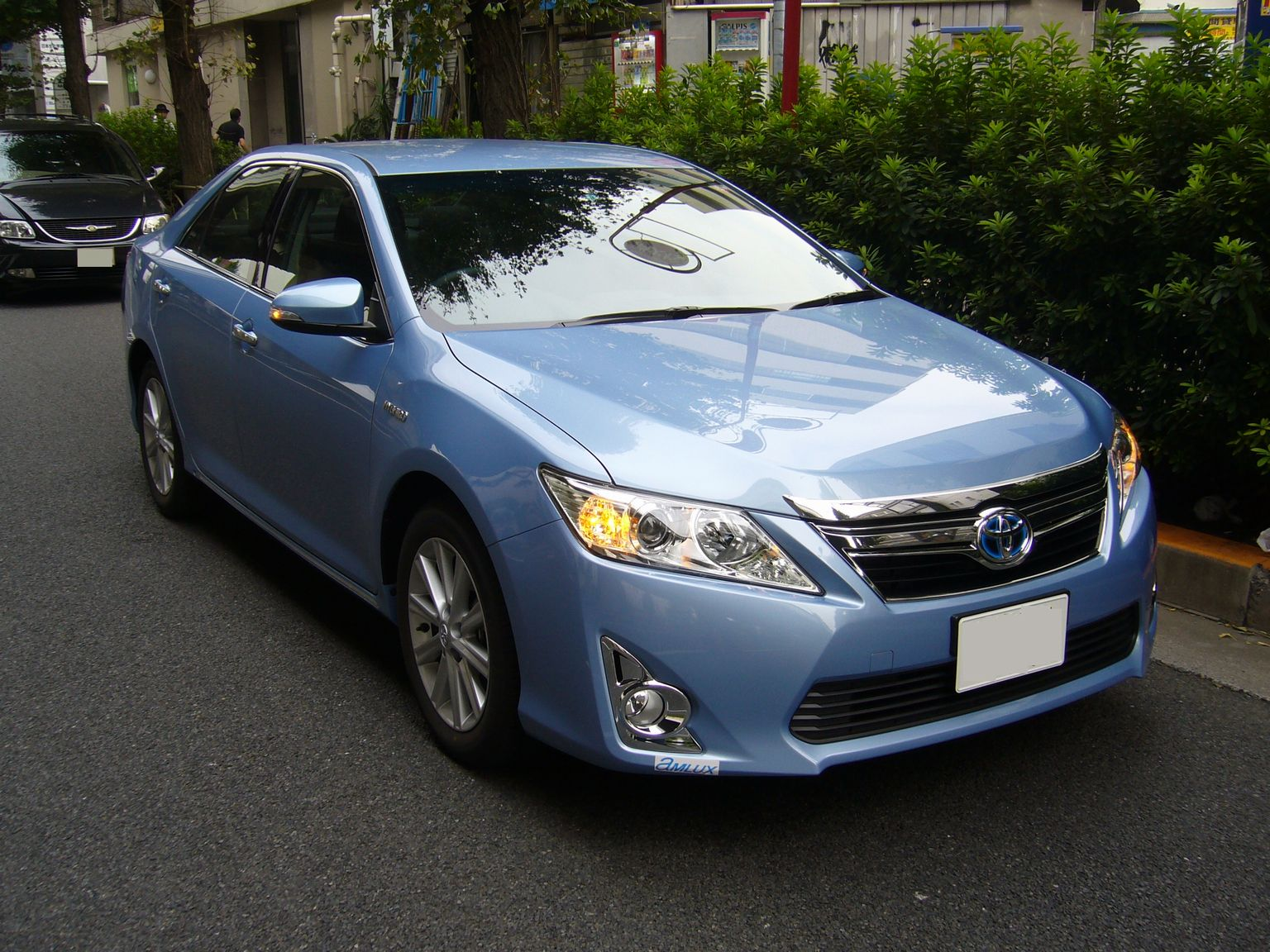
Prestige Camry Hybrid (Japan; pre-facelift)

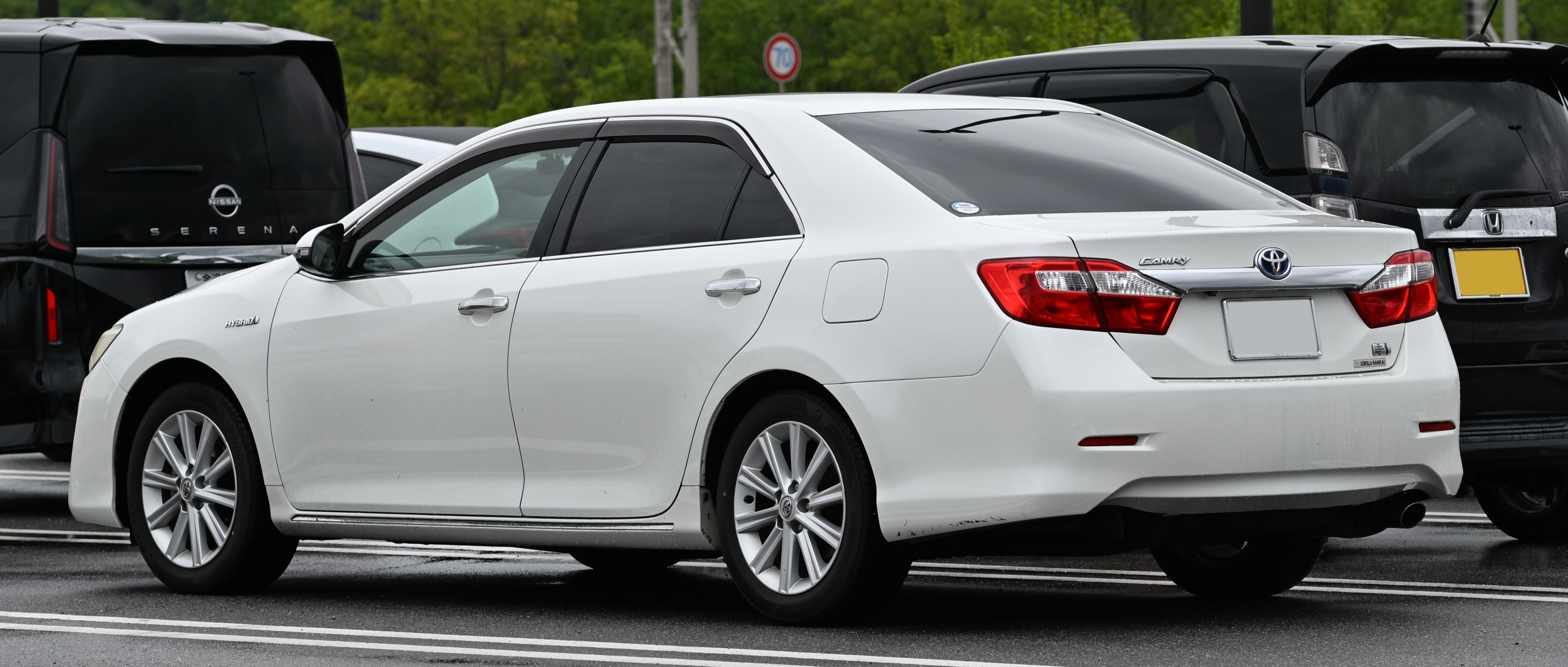
Prestige Camry (Japan; pre-facelift)

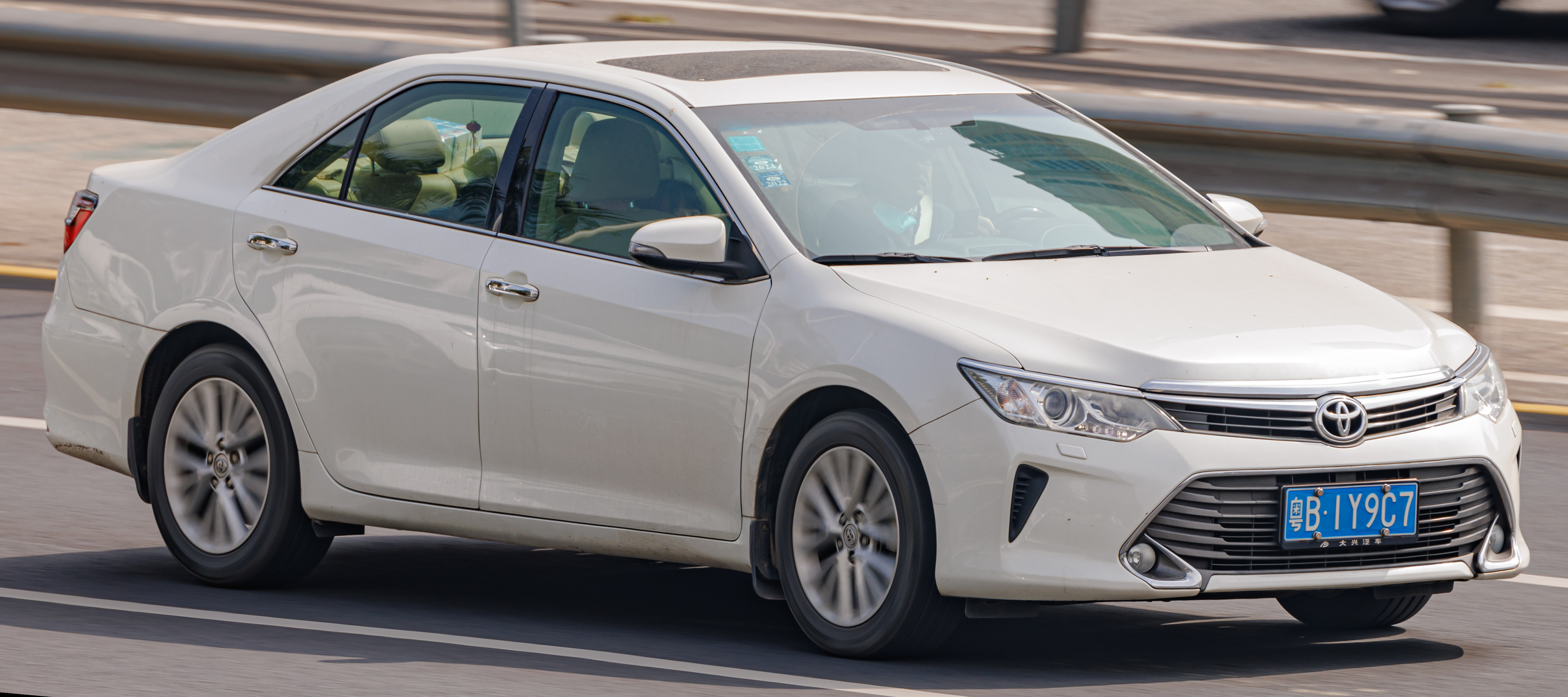
Prestige Camry (facelift)

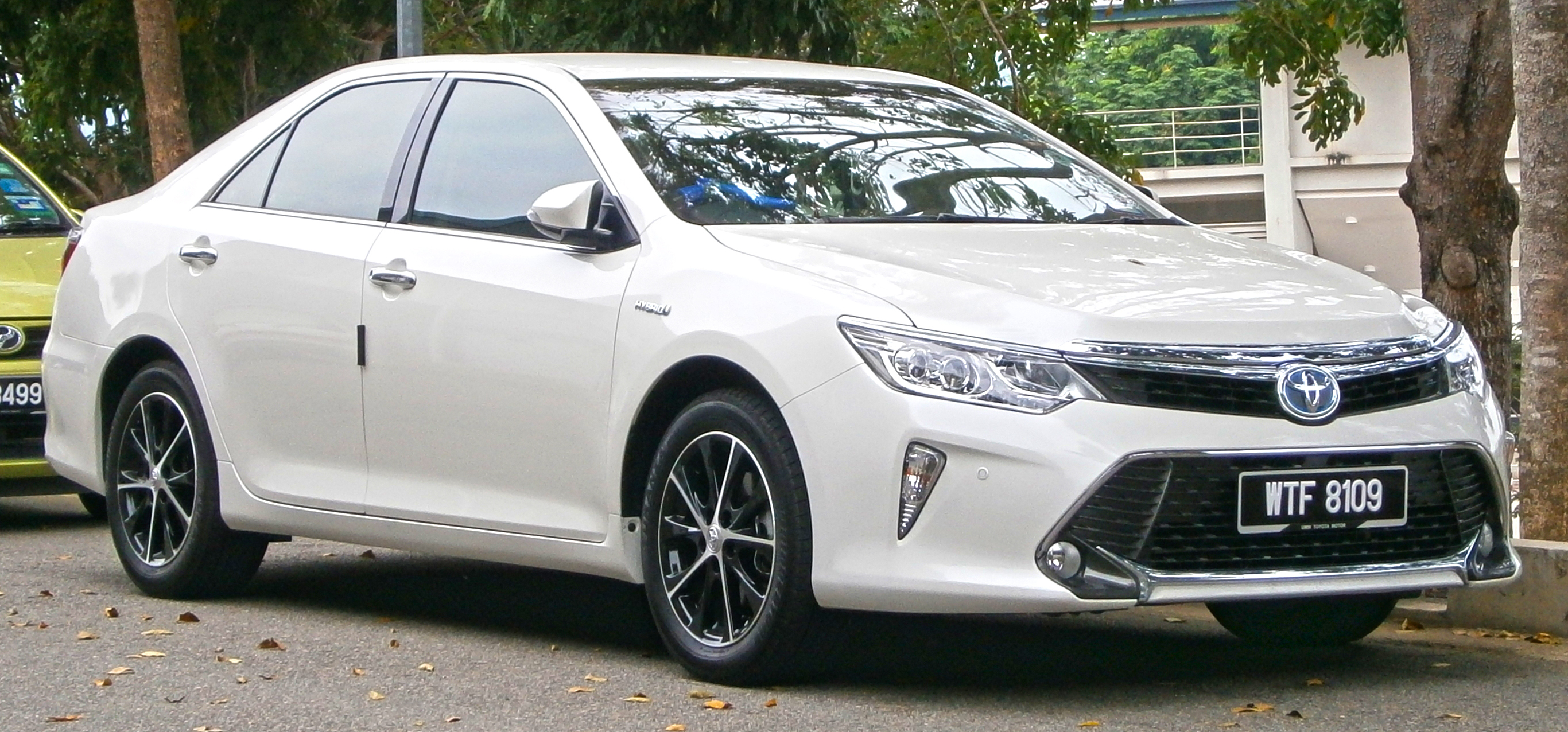
Prestige Camry Hybrid (facelift)

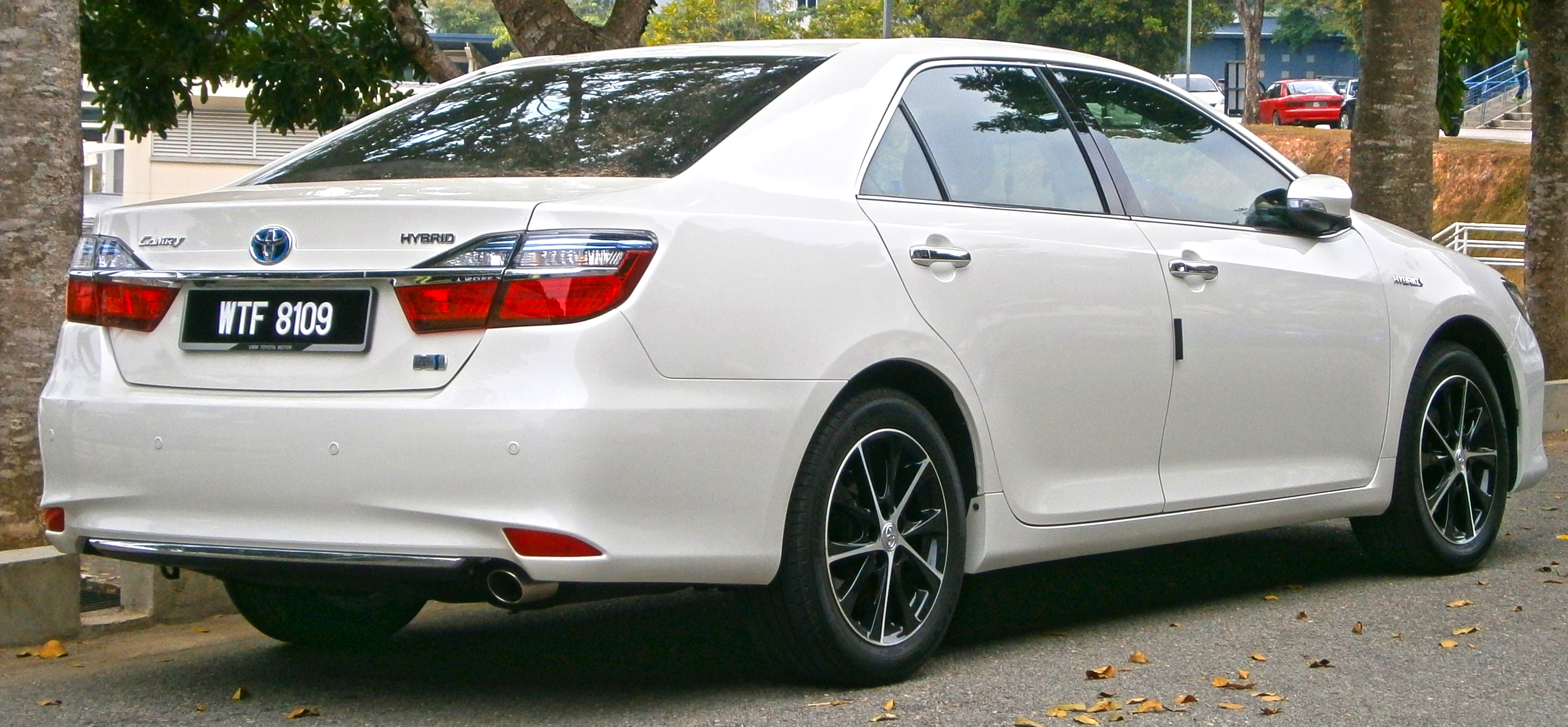
Prestige Camry Hybrid (facelift)

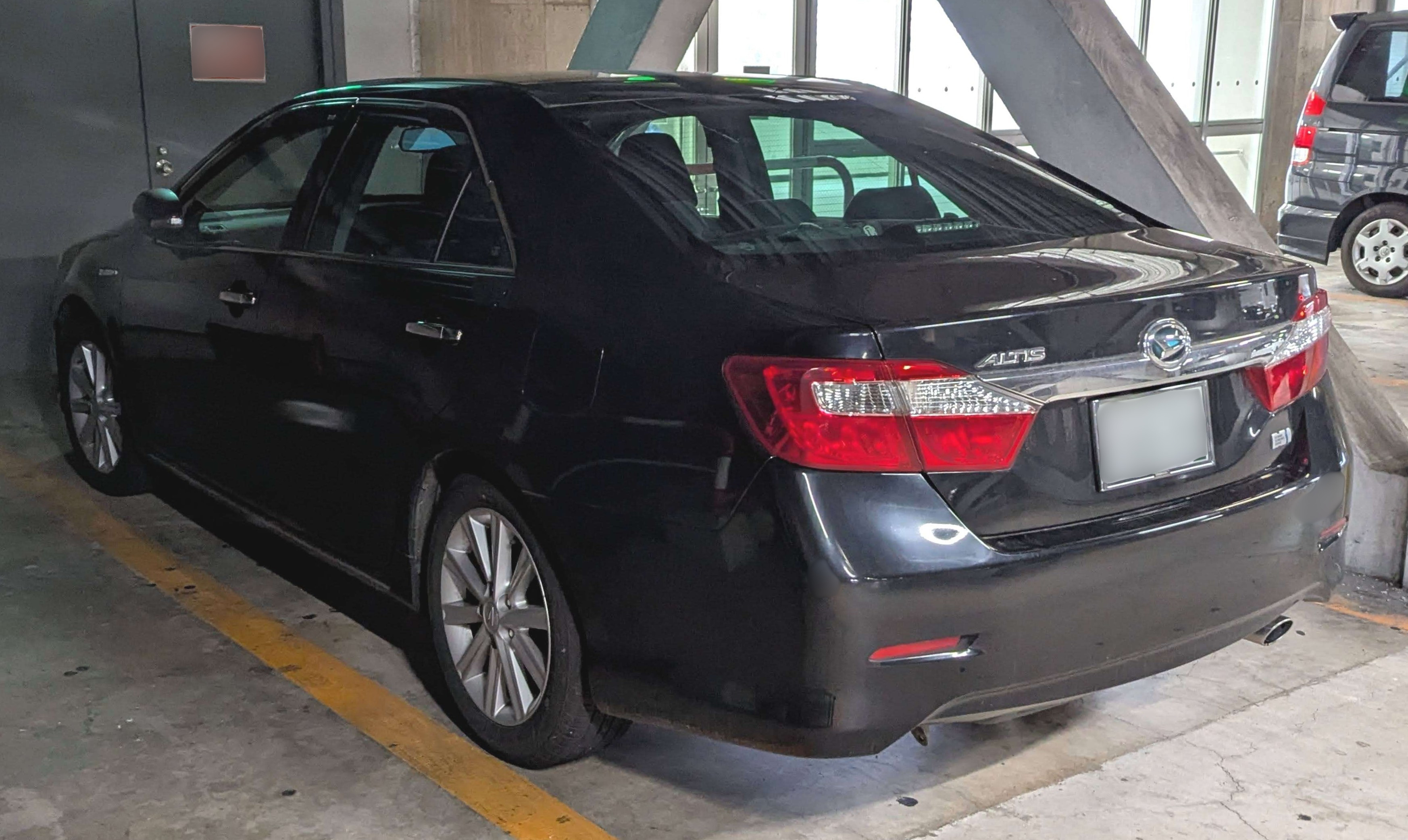
Daihatsu Altis (Japan)

=== XV70 (2017–2024) ===
XV70
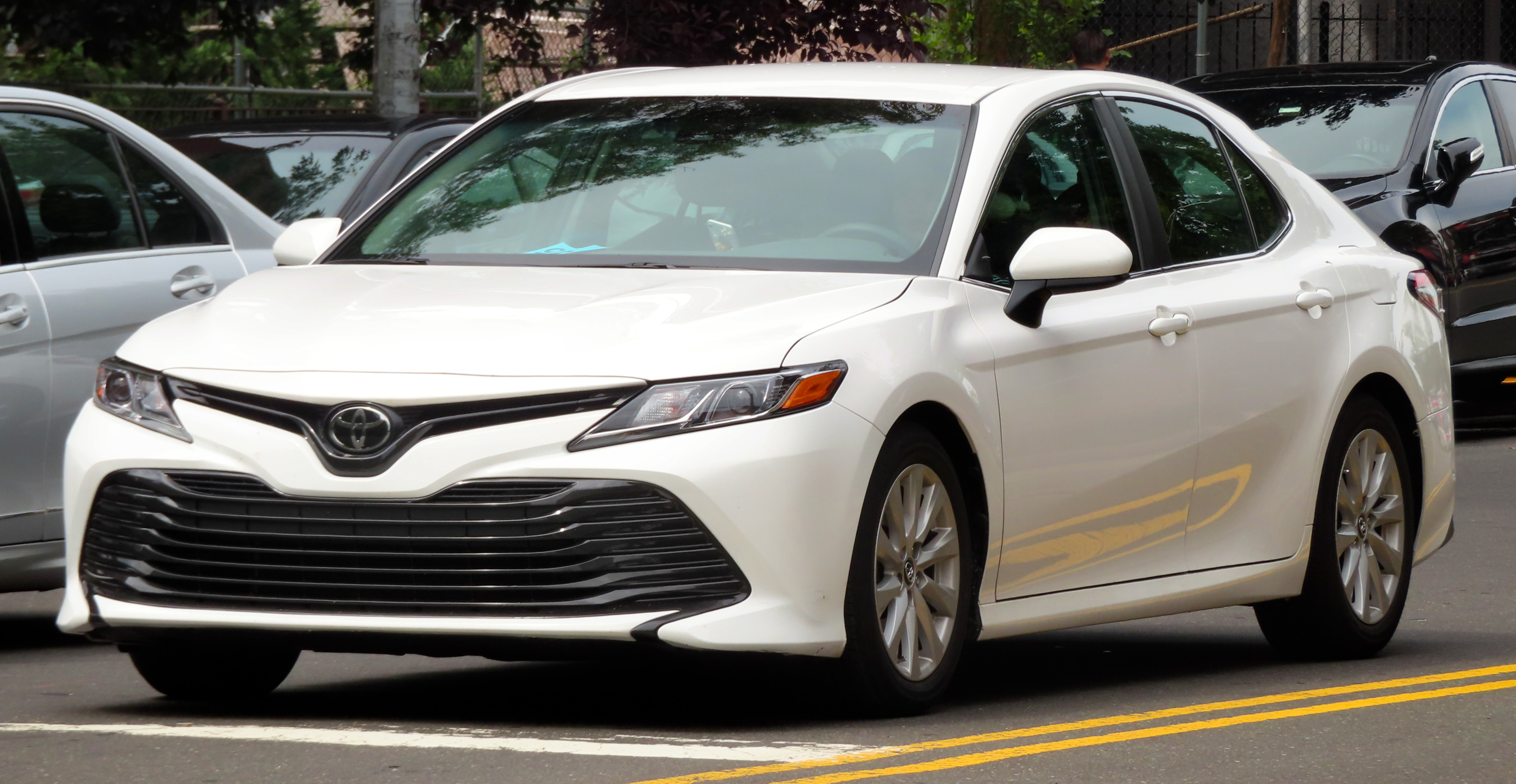
- Camry LE (pre-facelift)

Overview
- Model code: XV70
- Also called: Daihatsu Altis (Japan)
- Production: June 2017 – December 2023 (Japan); June 2017 – April 2024 (United States); December 2017 – October 2023 (China); April 2018 – March 2022 (Russia); October 2018 – October 2024 (Thailand)
- Model years: 2018–2024

Body and chassis
- Body style: 4-door sedan
- Platform: TNGA: GA-K

Chronology
- Predecessor: Toyota Avensis (T270) (Europe)

The XV70 Camry was introduced at the 2017 North American International Auto Show on 9 January 2017. It was launched in Japan on 10 July 2017, and in Australia on 21 November 2017. North American production started in June 2017, and sales began in late July 2017. It is built on the GA-K platform.

Engine choices include a base 2.5 L inline four-cylinder (I4) that now produces 151 kW (203 hp) in base form (155 kW (208 hp) when equipped with the optional quad exhaust), the same 2.5 L inline four-cylinder (I4) engine with an electric motor (Hybrid) that produces 155 kW (208 hp), or the top-of-the-line 3.5 L V6 that produces 224 kW (301 hp). In some markets the old 2.5 L 2AR-FE engine is carried over from the previous generation which produces 133 kW (178 hp).

The only major components shared with the previous generation are the Toyota emblem on the front grille and rear trunk lid.

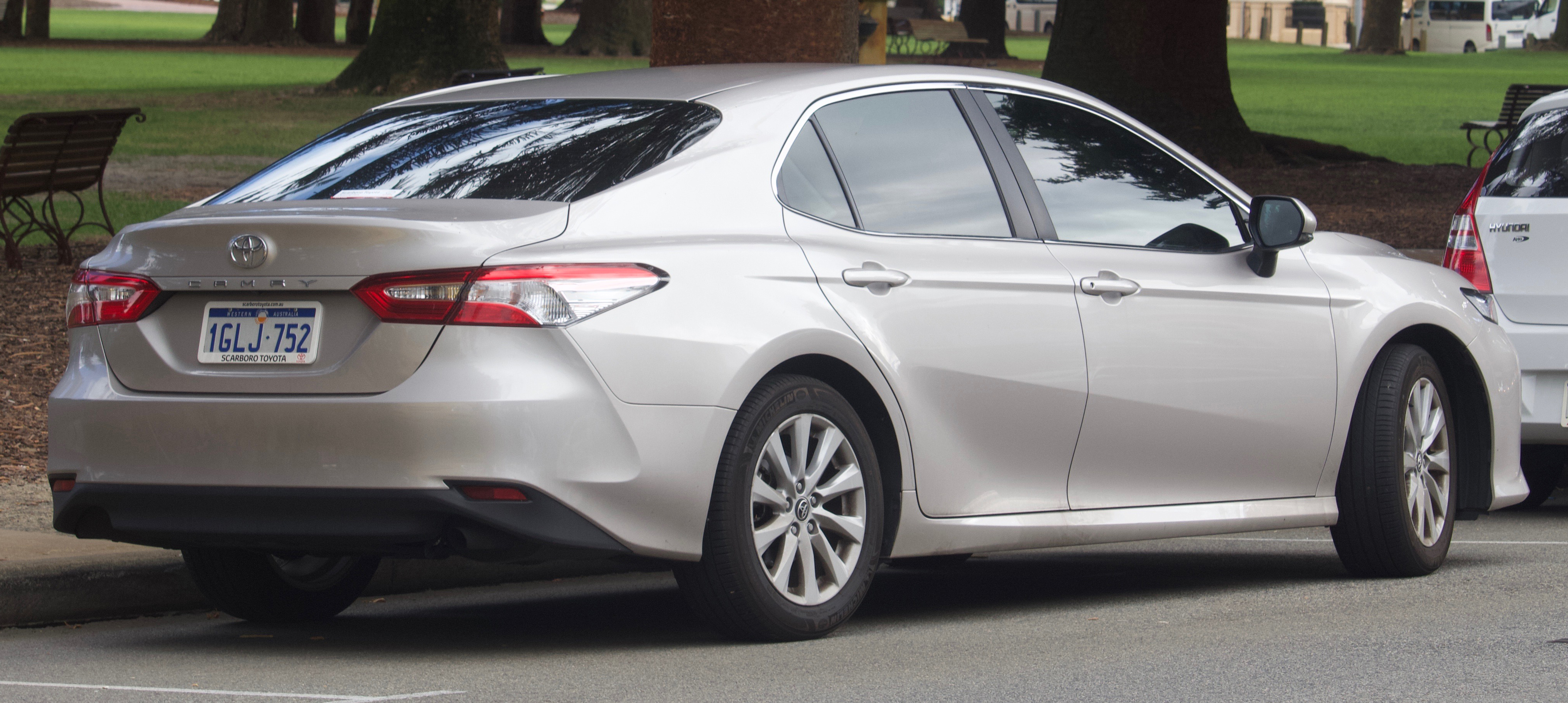
Camry Ascent (pre-facelift)

Camry SX/XSE front view (pre-facelift)

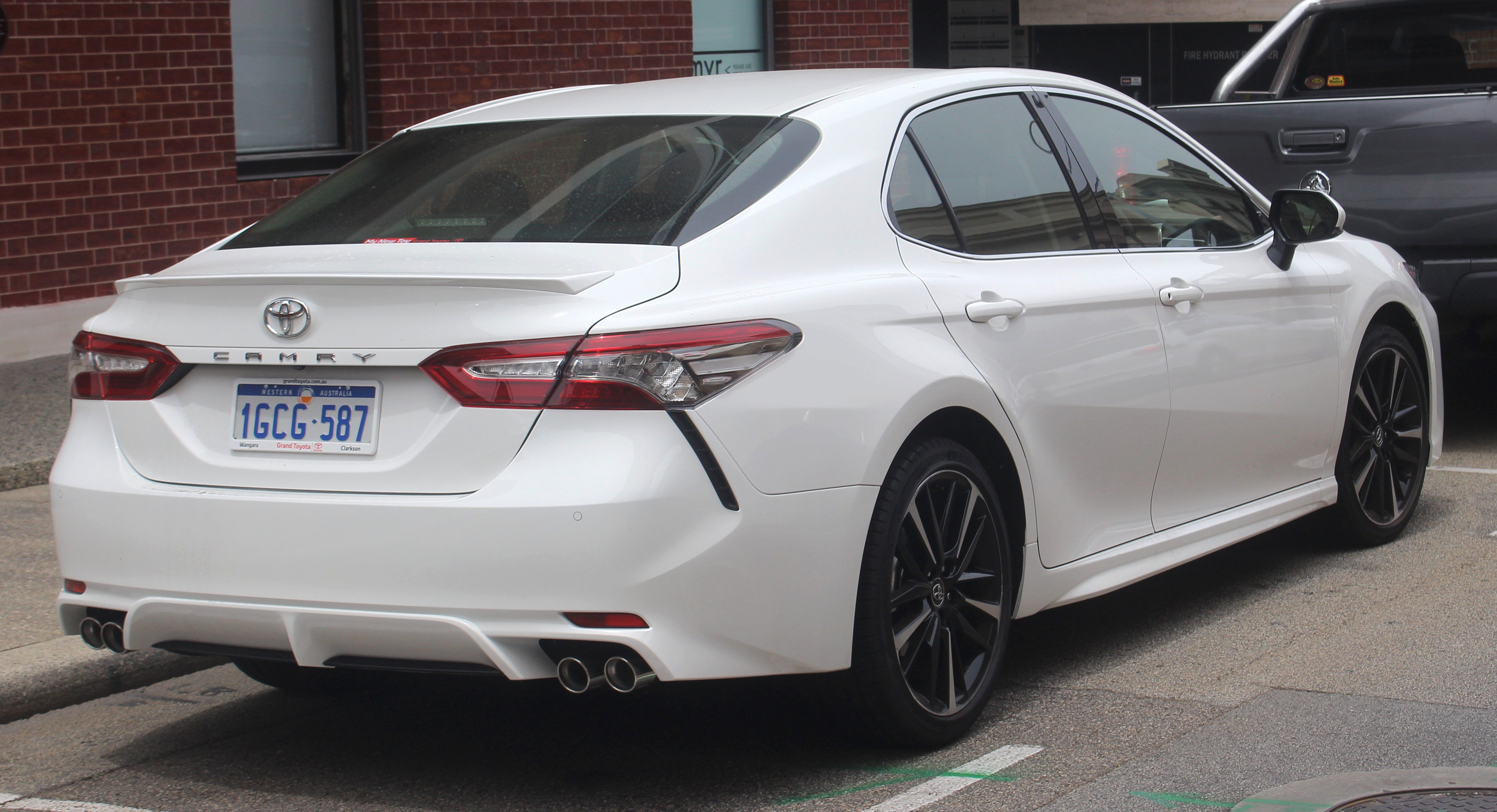
Camry SX/XSE rear view (pre-facelift)

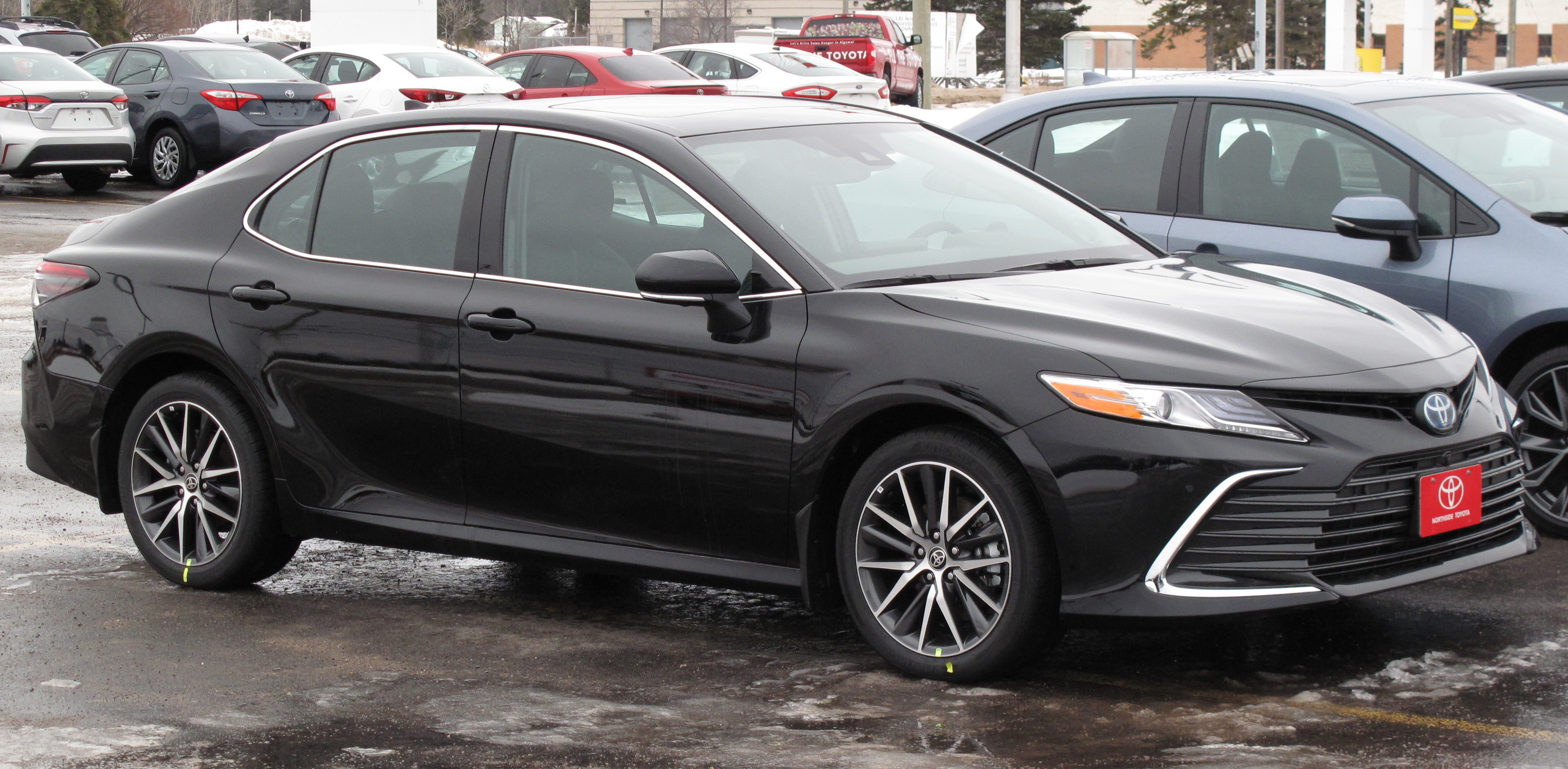
Camry Hybrid XLE (facelift)

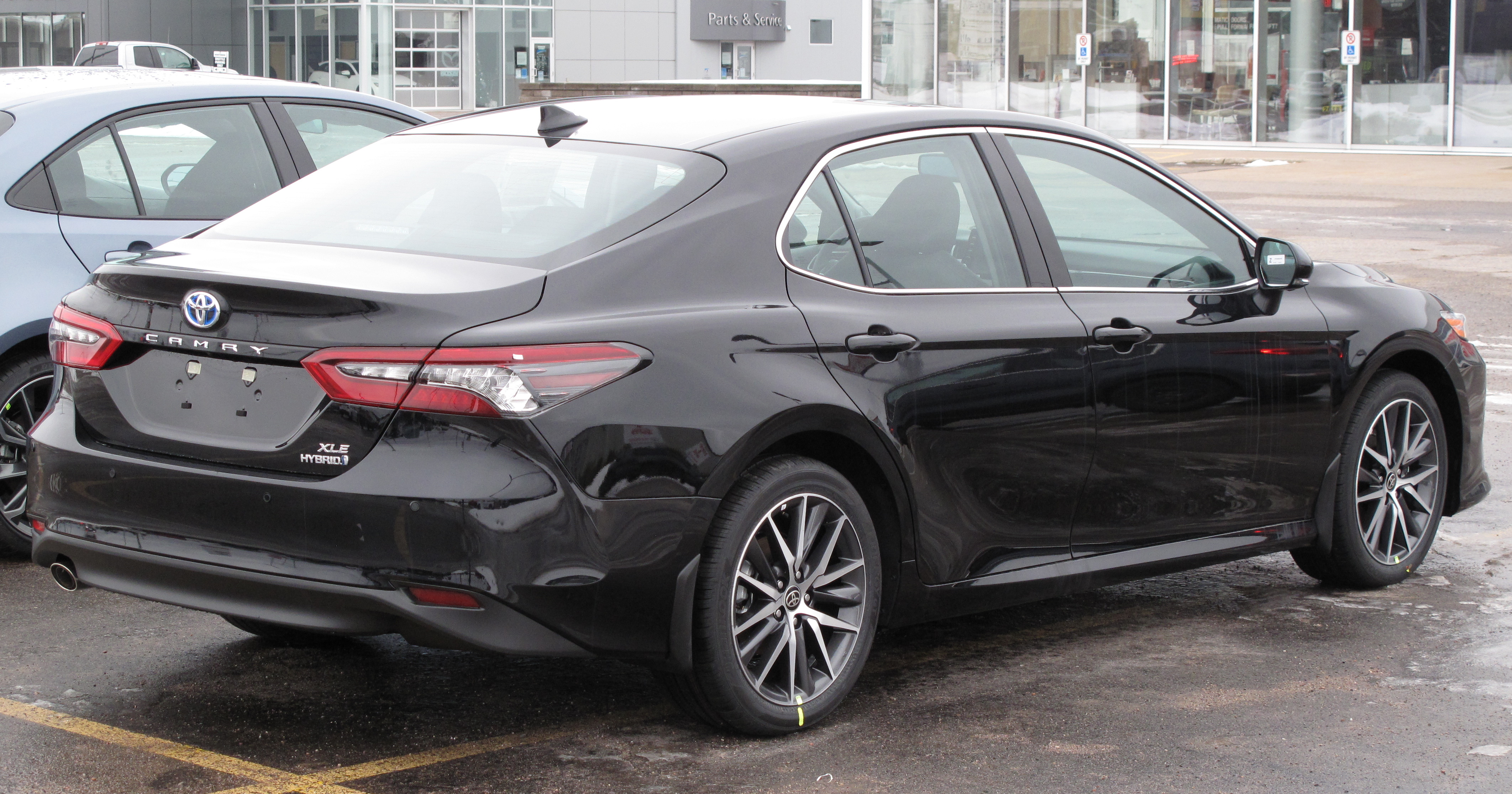
Camry Hybrid XLE (facelift)

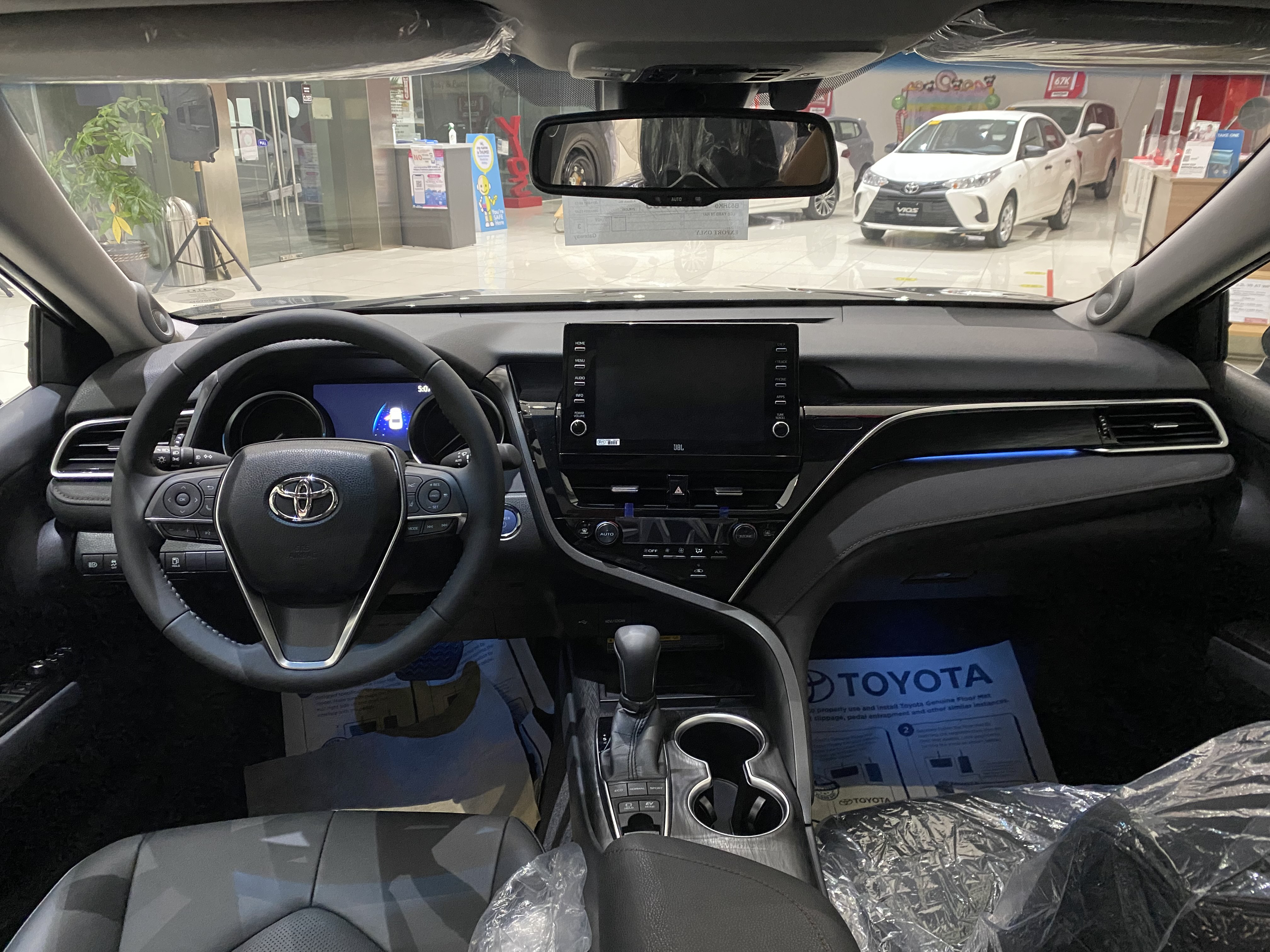
Interior (facelift)

=== XV80 (2023–present) ===
XV80
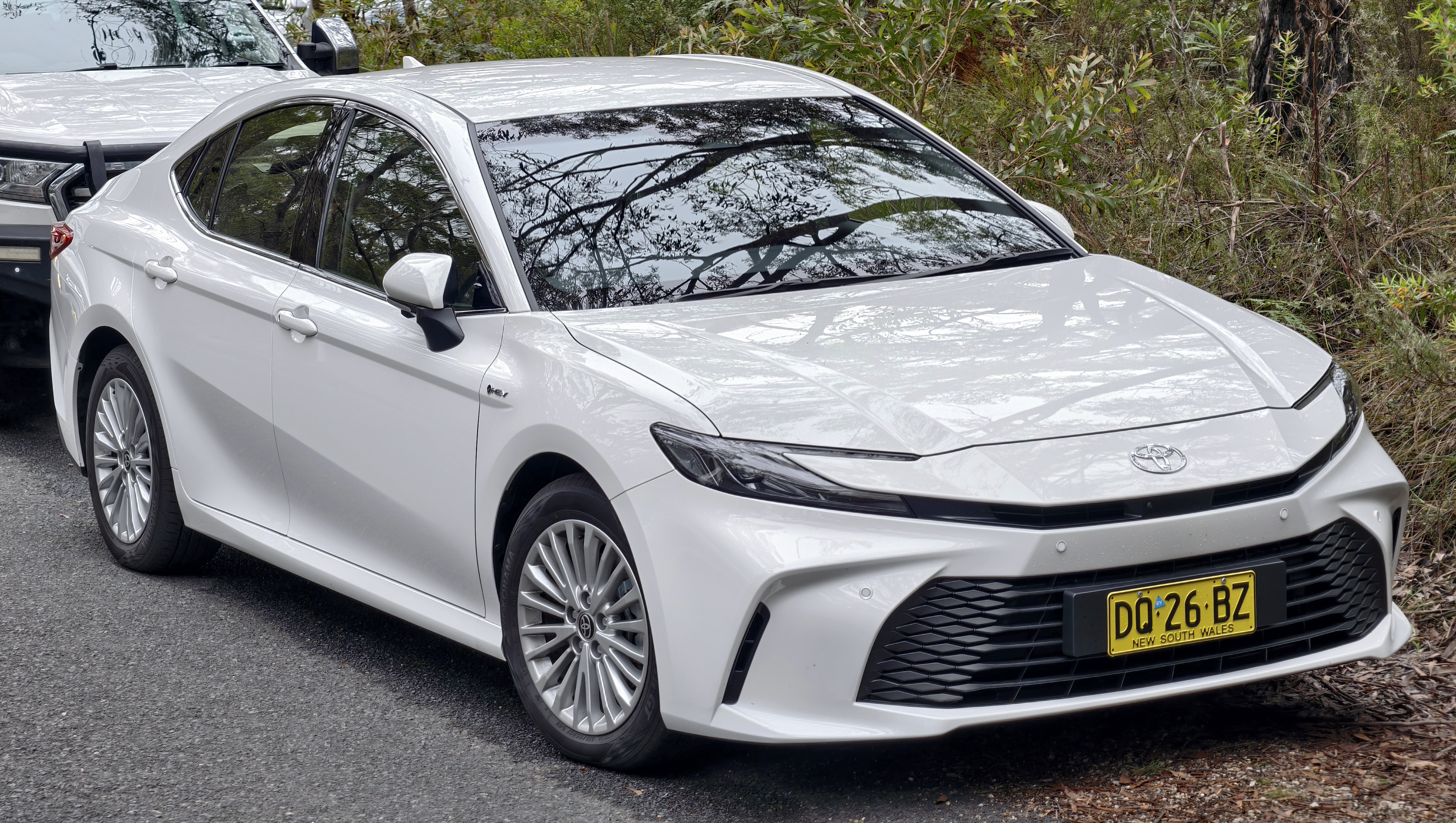
- Toyota Camry Hybrid Ascent Sport

Overview
- Model code: XV80
- Production: October 2023 – present (China); April 2024 – present (US); October 2024 – present (Thailand)
- Model years: 2025 – present
- Assembly: United States: Georgetown, Kentucky (TMMK); China: Nansha, Guangzhou (GAC Toyota); Japan: Toyota, Aichi (Tsutsumi plant); Thailand: Chachoengsao (TMT); India: Bidadi (TKML)

Body and chassis
- Body style: 4-door sedan
- Platform: TNGA: GA-K

The XV80 Camry was unveiled on 14 November 2023 and introduced at the 2023 Los Angeles Auto Show. It is built on the same GA-K platform from its predecessor, retaining the underlying body structure, front doors and roofline.

Unlike the previous generations, the XV80 Camry is not available with a pure gasoline engine for markets like North America and Europe. While the Camry is still assembled in Japan, the XV80 is the first Camry not available in its home market, only being exported to other markets.

=== Gallery ===
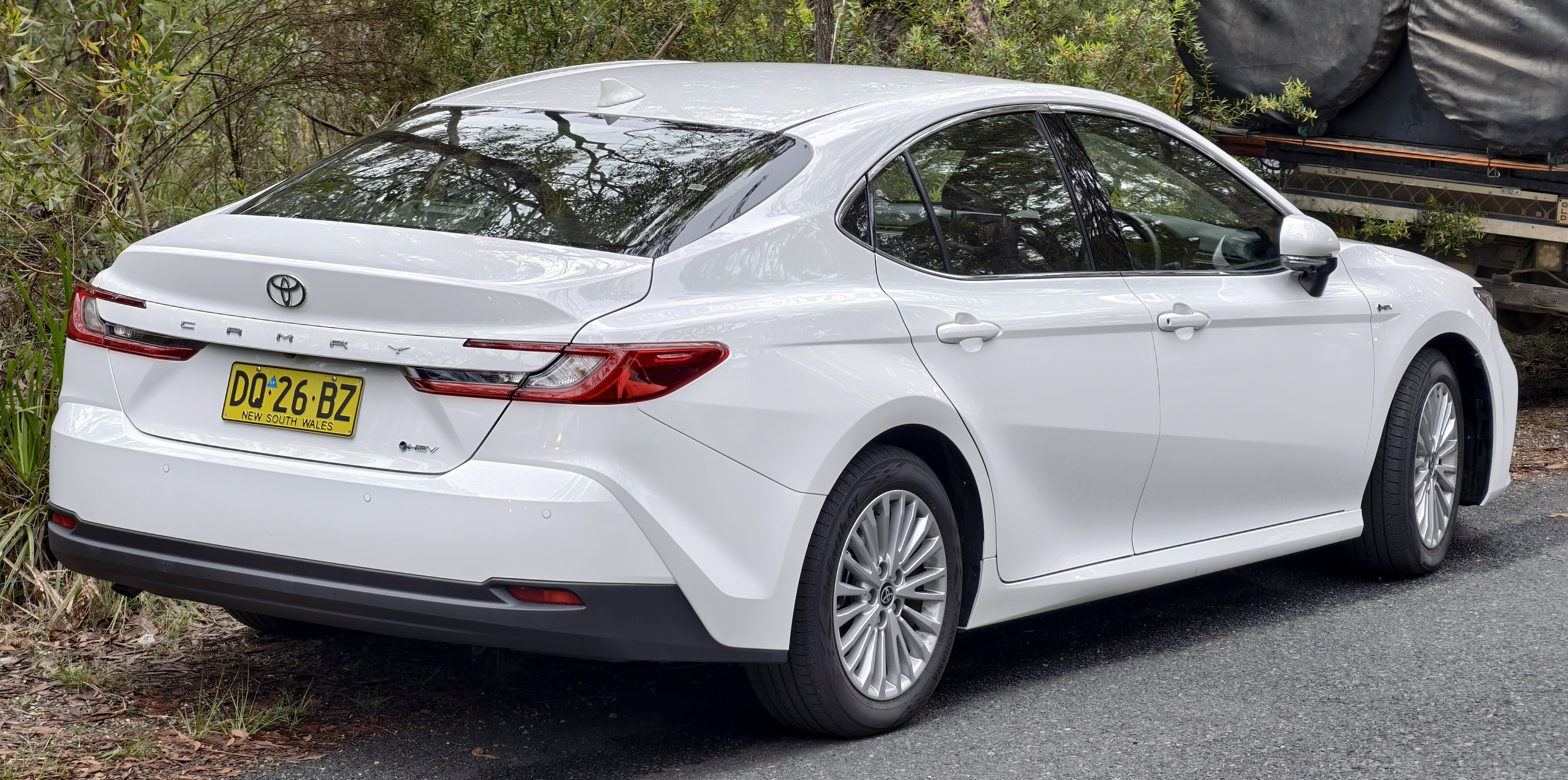
Rear view

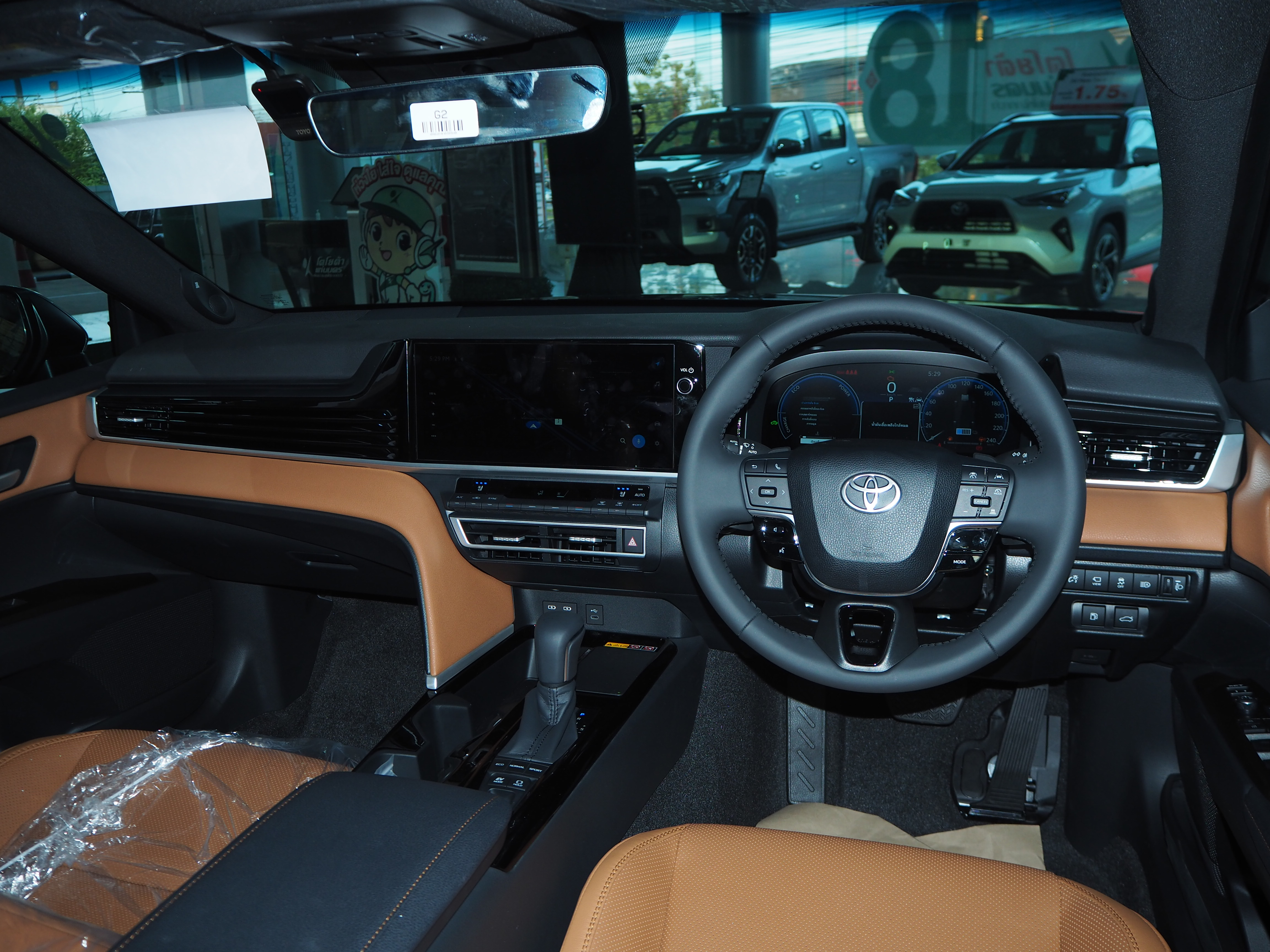
Interior

== Sales ==
Competing with mainstream and more affordable models in Western markets, for other export markets in Asia and Latin America, the Camry is seen as a luxury car where it sells strongly (and serves as Toyota's flagship vehicle along with the Land Cruiser). In the United States, as of 2025, the Camry has been the best-selling passenger car each year since 2002, also holding the title from 1997 to 2000. Despite international success, and early success in Japan, the later wide-body models have been a low-volume model in its home market. However, since the introduction of the XV50 Camry in 2011, sales of the wide-body models in Japan have resurged, thanks, in large part, to the inclusion of Toyota's Hybrid Synergy Drive system.

The Camry has profited within its medium-sized class. In Australia it has been a best-seller since 1993, beating traditional competitors including the Mazda6, as well as the contemporary Ford Mondeo and Škoda Superb. The Middle East, as well as Eastern Europe, each have seen the Camry sell well, with Western Europe previously having small amounts exported.

Calendar year	U.S.	Australia	Canada	China	Mexico	Europe	Thailand	Malaysia (Note: Figures based on registration (Malaysia))	Indonesia
1983	52,651								
1984	93,725								
1985	128,143								
1986	151,767								
1987	186,623								
1988	225,322	30,273							
1989	255,252	32,308							
1990	283,042	31,621							
1991	262,531	27,672							
1992	284,751	25,699							
1993	297,836	32,551							
1994	319,718	35,859							
1995	326,632	33,367							
1996	357,359	31,777							
1997	394,397	30,890				10,434			
1998	427,308	42,031				6,025			
1999	445,696	42,522				3,520			155
2000	422,961	33,334				2,927		2,585	613
2001	388,512	26,726				2,313		1,452	579
2002	434,145	30,952			1,865	4,634		3,656	1,089
2003	413,296	38,540			1,831	2,401		6,163	1,516
2004	426,990	40,356			2,241			5,683	1,706
2005	431,703	36,492			2,646			6,064	1,842
2006	448,445	30,262		60,647	7,121			4,870	1,145
2007	472,808	26,342		169,684	6,863			9,504	2,696
2008	436,617	23,067		153,532	4,979			12,735	3,190
2009	356,824	20,846		154,977	3,836			8,850	1,175
2010	327,553	25,014		161,410	3,717			11,505	2,484
2011	306,510	19,169		143,703	4,167			7,718	2,005
2012	404,885	27,230	18,203	145,402	5,777			9,553	2,339
2013	408,484	24,860	18,245	177,649	3,824			6,019	2,250
2014	428,606	22,044	16,029	150,311	2,754		6,847	5,664	1,435
2015	429,355	27,654	16,805	128,046	3,361		8,087	7,347	1,173
2016	388,616	26,485	15,683	100,611	3,187		5,909	3,918	1,140
2017	387,081	23,620	14,574	75,237	2,481		4,505	3,245	1,074
2018	343,439	15,269	14,588	163,046	2,744		4,589	2,204	702
2019	336,978	16,768	13,654	185,245	3,683	7,640		1,881	1,499
2020	294,348	13,727	11,631	185,140	2,491	9,119		845	822
2021	313,795	13,081	11,897	216,764	3,016	8,222		884	813
2022	295,201	9,538	6,009	261,084	3,143	15,127	6,089	592	887
2023	290,649	10,581		225,503	2,819	14,866		2,992	494
2024	309,876	15,401		158,038	3,923	11,229	3,775	646	137
2025	316,185	9,860		208,652	3,804	13,190			32

== Notes ==
=== Hybrid sales ===
Camry Hybrid
Calendar year	US	Indonesia
2006	31,341	—
2007	54,477	—
2008	46,272	—
2009	22,887	—
2010	14,587	—
2011	9,241	—
2012	45,656	405
2013	44,448	353
2014	39,515	233
2015	30,640	94
2016	22,227	98
2017	20,985	134
2018	22,914	25
2019	26,043	223
2020	33,826	130
2021	46,399	279
2022	41,830	284
2023	35,445	365
2024		152
2025		281

== See also ==
- List of Toyota vehicles
