= Toyota Kijang =

Pickup truck / station wagon model from Toyota

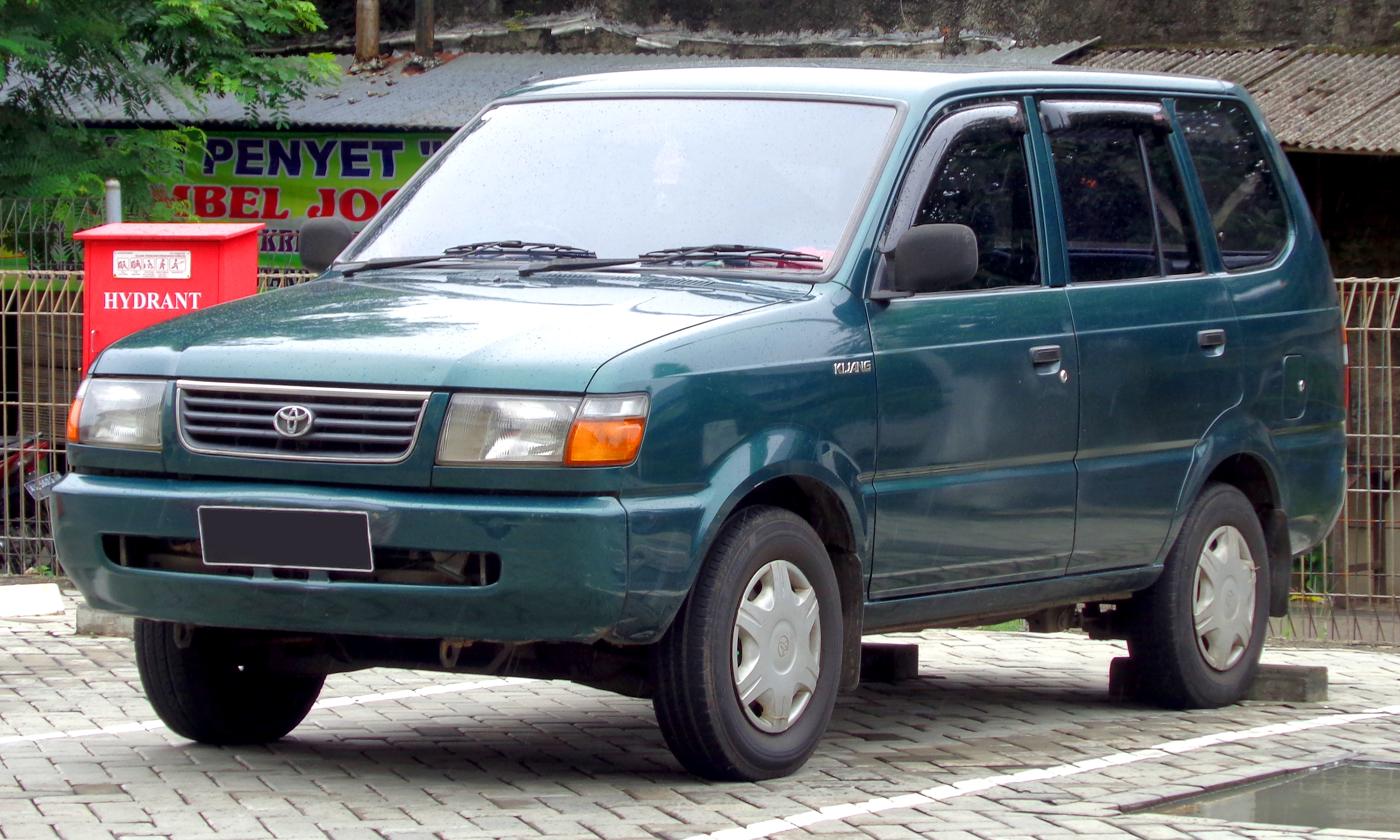
- 1997 Toyota Kijang SSX 1.8 (KF70, Indonesia)

Overview
- Manufacturer: Toyota
- Also called: Toyota Tamaraw/Revo (Philippines, 1976–2005); Toyota Unser (Malaysia, 1998–2005); Toyota Zace / Zace Surf (Vietnam and Taiwan); Toyota Qualis (India, 2000–2005); Toyota Stallion/Venture/Condor (Africa); Toyota Traka (Papua New Guinea, 1980)
- Production: 1976–2007

Body and chassis
- Class: Compact pickup truck (1976–2007); Compact station wagon (1986–2005)
- Body style: 2-door pickup; Station wagon; Van
- Layout: Front-engine, rear-wheel-drive (1976–2005); Front-engine, four-wheel-drive (fourth generation only)
- Chassis: Body-on-frame

Chronology
- Successor: Toyota Avanza; Toyota Rush; Toyota Innova; Toyota Hilux; Toyota Fortuner; Toyota Hilux Champ

The Toyota Kijang is a series of pickup trucks, station wagons and light commercial vehicles produced and marketed mainly in Southeast Asia, Taiwan, India and South Africa by Toyota between 1976 and 2007 under various other names.

The vehicle first entered production in the Philippines as the Toyota Tamaraw in December 1976. It was then introduced in Indonesia in June 1977 as the Kijang, after its unnamed prototype model was showcased in Jakarta in mid-1975. The first two generations were produced from factory as pickup trucks, conversions to other body styles were conducted by local third-party companies. Availability of the model was expanded to more markets since the third-generation model, such as Africa and Taiwan.

The Kijang was relatively affordable in the markets where it was sold when compared to the four-wheel drive vehicles (it is predominantly rear-wheel drive) and had high seating capacity, high ground clearance and rugged suspension, popular features in an area with generally poor road conditions and large extended families. It was also designed with ease of manufacture in mind; in 1986, the assembly of the Kijang only cost 42 percent of the cost of assembling the smaller E80 Corolla. It was manufactured as a CKD (complete knock-down) unit in almost every country it was sold in and many of the parts come from each of the markets in which it was sold.

The name Kijang means muntjac or deer in Indonesian. Due to the varying names used in different countries, the vehicle is internally known as the 'TUV', short for 'Toyota Utility Vehicle'. Fourth-generation models in the Philippines were sold under the Toyota Revo nameplate. The Kijang was also sold in other countries, and is known as the Toyota Qualis in India and Nepal (third generation), Toyota Zace in Vietnam and Taiwan (third and fourth generation), Toyota Unser in Malaysia (fourth generation) and Toyota Stallion in Africa for the basic models (third and fourth generation), with higher specifications labelled Toyota Venture (third generation) and Toyota Condor in South Africa (fourth generation).

== First generation (F10; 1976) ==
First generation
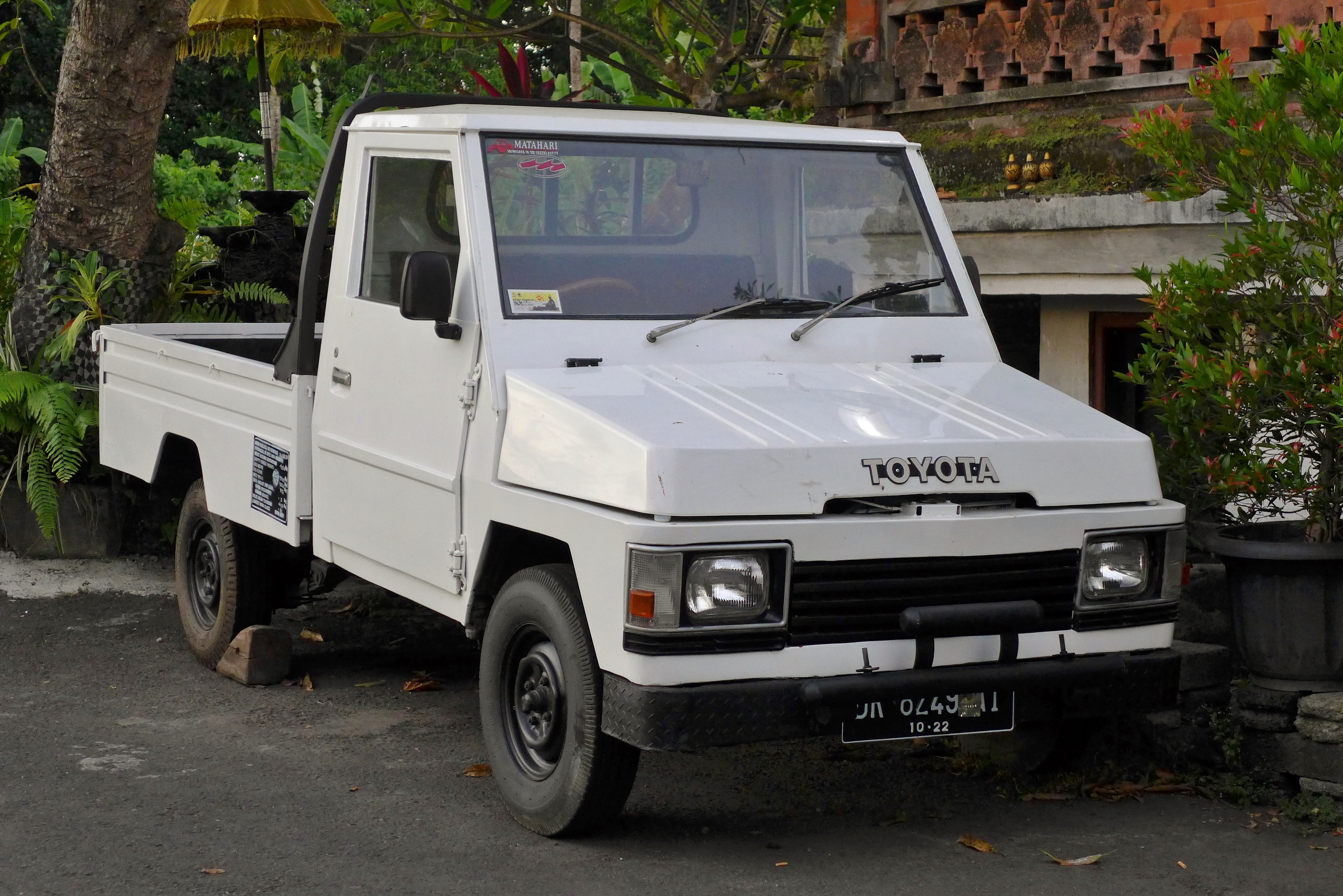
- Toyota Kijang with aftermarket square headlamps (KF10, Indonesia)

Overview
- Model code: F10
- Also called: Toyota Tamaraw (Philippines); Toyota Traka (Papua New Guinea)
- Production: 1976–1981 (Tamaraw); May 1977 – 1981 (Kijang)
- Assembly: Indonesia: Sunter, North Jakarta (Multi Astra); Philippines: Parañaque (Toyota Bicutan Parañaque)

Body and chassis
- Class: Compact pickup truck
- Body style: 2-door pickup
- Layout: Front-engine, rear-wheel-drive

Powertrain
- Engine: Petrol: 1.2 L 3K I4
- Power output: 40–45 kW (54–60 hp; 54–61 PS)
- Transmission: 4-speed manual K40

Dimensions
- Wheelbase: 2,500 mm (98.4 in)
- Length: 4,070 mm (160.2 in)
- Width: 1,550–1,580 mm (61.0–62.2 in)
- Height: 1,760–1,975 mm (69.3–77.8 in)
- Kerb weight: 940 kg (2,072 lb)

The Kijang prototype was first displayed at the 1975 Jakarta Fair and then entered production in 1977. The name Kijang means muntjac or deer in Indonesian. Its development was led by Osamu Ohta with Ohyama as the chief engineer in 1972. The first-generation Kijang is a compact, light pickup truck powered by a carburetted 1.2-litre 3K four-cylinder OHV petrol engine matched to a 4-speed manual transmission. A pickup variant with rear body and roof was also produced. The Kijang Minibus (van/wagon version) was built by local companies.

The Kijang first entered the Indonesian market on 9 June 1977, although it had been on sale in the Philippines since 2 December 1976. It has a boxy design with externally hinged half doors and plastic/canvas windows. Designated KF10, it shared the 3K engine with the 1972 Corolla, coupled to a 4-speed manual transmission. It was colloquially nicknamed 'Kijang Buaya' (meaning "Crocodile Kijang") as the engine bonnet resembled a crocodile's mouth once opened. The KF10 Kijang sold 26,806 units in its 4 years of production when it would be replaced by the second-generation model.

=== Tamaraw (Philippines) ===
In the Philippines, the Kijang was sold as the Tamaraw (named for one of the country's national animals, the Tamaraw), produced in the 1970s up to early 1980s. Introduced in December 1976, it started as a small 3/4 ton high-side pick-up (HSPU) with a 1.2-litre 3K engine producing 41 kW (55 hp; 56 PS), and was produced by the now-defunct Delta Motors, which assembled Toyota vehicles in the Philippines. It was considered as a "BUV", or "Basic Utility Vehicle". It had a 4-speed manual transmission, and some models had no driver- or front passenger-side doors. Because of its simplicity, ruggedness and ease of maintenance, even its upgradability (some swap the 3K engine with a more powerful engine, usually a diesel engine or any in Toyota's K series of engines), some of these vehicles survive today, and its designs are sometimes copied or modified by local assemblers to this day. It was proven success that General Motors (through Francisco Motors), Ford and Chrysler (with Mitsubishi) created their own versions of the BUV, including the two versions of the Pinoy and the Ford Fiera and Chrysler-Mitsubishi Cimarron.

The KF10 Tamaraw was also imported and distributed in Papua New Guinea in 1980 by Ela Motors, a division of the Burns Philip Group. The vehicle was renamed to Toyota Traka and was described as "using the same engine as the popular Toyota Corolla, the Traka is a basic utility vehicle capable of carrying a payload of 750 kg (1,653 lb) and developing more than 60 hp".

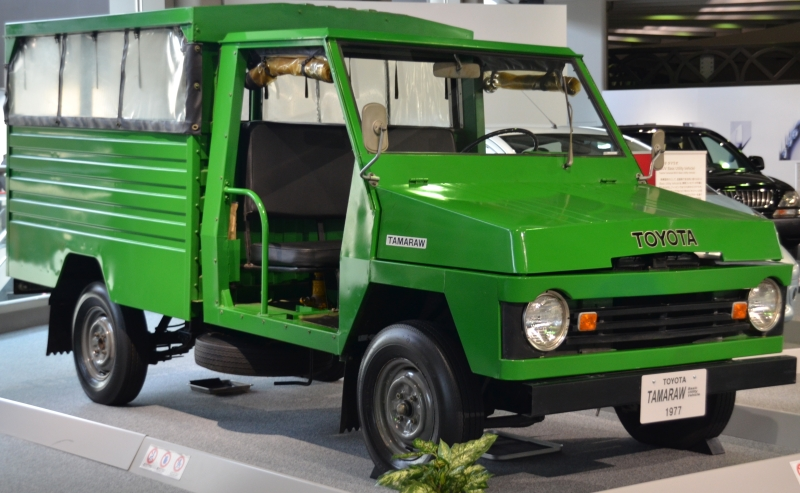
Toyota Tamaraw (KF10, Philippines) at the Toyota Automobile Museum

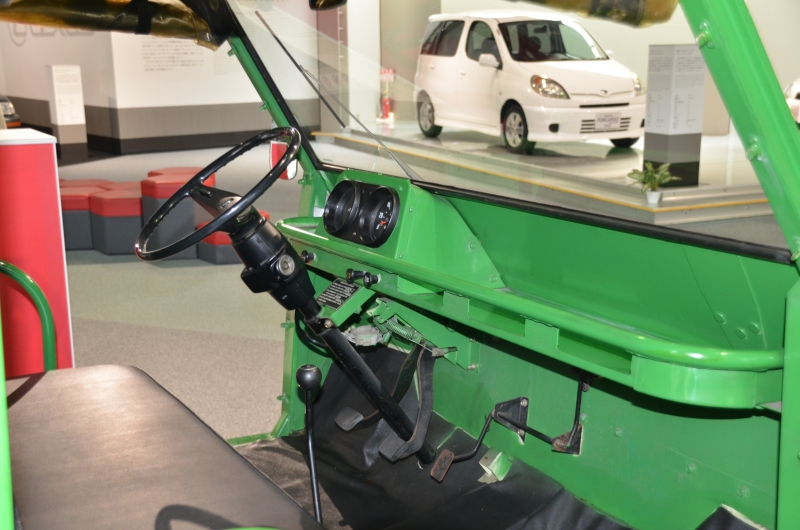
Tamaraw interior

== Second generation (F20/F30; 1981) ==
Second generation
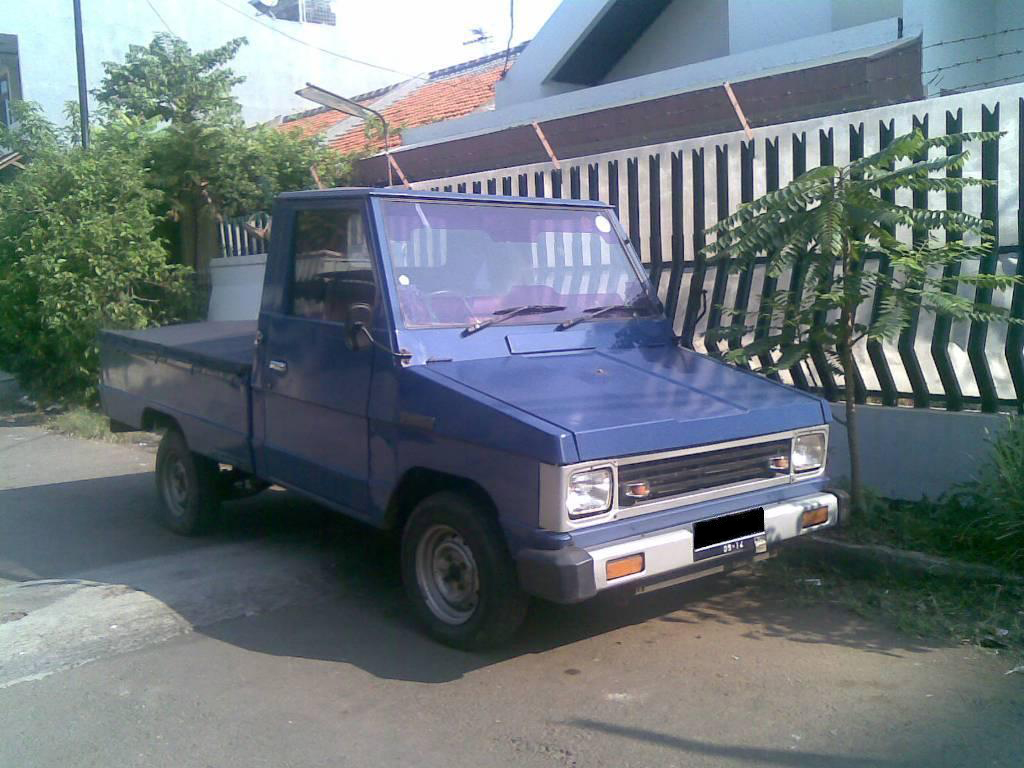
- 1985 Toyota Kijang (KF20, Indonesia)

Overview
- Model code: F20; F30
- Also called: Toyota Tamaraw (Philippines); Toyota TUV (South Africa)
- Production: 1981–1986
- Assembly: Indonesia: Sunter, North Jakarta (Multi Astra); Philippines: Parañaque; South Africa: Prospecton (TSAM)

Body and chassis
- Class: Compact pickup truck
- Body style: 2-door pickup
- Layout: Front-engine, rear-wheel-drive

Powertrain
- Engine: Petrol: 1.3 L 4K I4; 1.5 L 5K I4
- Power output: 44 kW (59 hp; 60 PS) (4K); 53 kW (71 hp; 72 PS) (5K)
- Transmission: 4-speed manual K40

Dimensions
- Wheelbase: 2,500 mm (98.4 in)
- Length: 4,100 mm (161.4 in)
- Width: 1,600 mm (63.0 in)
- Height: 1,955 mm (77.0 in)

The second-generation Kijang (designated KF20), launched in June 1981, retained its boxy style although the body panels were different. It is colloquially called the 'Kijang Doyok' in Indonesia. Under its slimmer bonnet was a 1.3-litre 4K engine, which was replaced in December 1985 by a 1.5-litre 5K engine. The only transmission option was a 4-speed manual. With the 5K engine, the power increased from 44 kW (59 hp; 60 PS) to 53 kW (71 hp; 72 PS), both at 5,600 rpm. The 1986 model can be seen from the outside by rectangular headlamps and a redesigned grille. The Kijang started selling very strongly in 1983 and 1984, catching up to erstwhile market leaders such as the Suzuki Super Carry and the Daihatsu Hijet. The more powerful Kijang offered more carrying capacity, while the engine placement made it safer than its cheaper, kei truck-based competitors. In February 1985, the 100,000th Kijang left the production line.

In the Philippines, the Tamaraw was also sold as the long-wheelbase F30 series, which was also promoted as an alternative to the jeepney. A local Philippine auto brand, Dragon, later took the designs of the long-wheelbase Tamaraw and marketed it. Pilipinas Nissan bought the designs from Ford (after their exit in 1984) for what would have been the Fiera IV and marketed it as the "Bida" ("protagonist" in Tagalog), which resembles the long-wheelbase Tamaraw.

In South Africa, production of the vehicle commenced in 1982 for the local market. Marketed simply as the TUV (short for 'Toyota Utility Vehicle'), the vehicle was available as a 2-door pickup truck called the TUV Bakkie and with a 10-seater cab called the TUV Stallion. Both are powered by the 1.3-litre 4K engine.

== Third generation (F40/F50; 1986) ==
Third generation
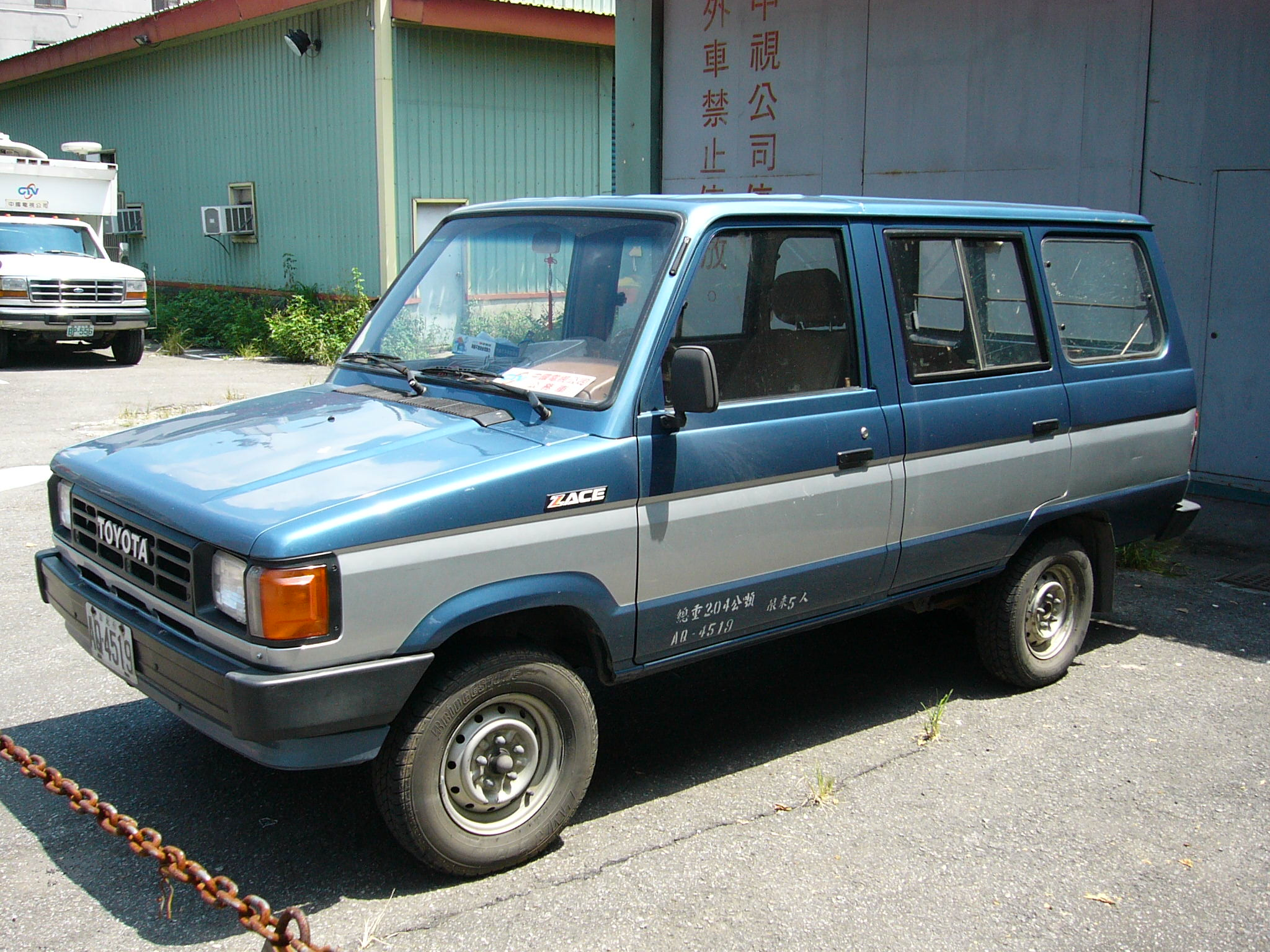
- Toyota Zace (KF50; pre-facelift, Taiwan)

Overview
- Model code: F40 (short-wheelbase); F50 (long-wheelbase)
- Also called: Toyota Tamaraw FX (Philippines); Toyota Qualis (India); Toyota Venture (South Africa); Toyota Stallion (South Africa; Panel Van/Pickup); Toyota Zace (Vietnam and Taiwan)
- Production: October 1986 – December 1996 (Indonesia); 1988–1998 (Taiwan); 1991–2002 (Philippines); 1994–2000 (South Africa); 2000–2005 (India)
- Assembly: Indonesia: Sunter, North Jakarta (Multi Astra); Philippines: Parañaque (TMP); South Africa: Prospecton (TSAM); India: Bidadi (TKM); Taiwan: Zhongli (1988–1995); Guanyin (1995–1998)

Body and chassis
- Class: Compact station wagon; Compact pickup truck
- Body style: 3-/4-/5-door wagon/van; 2-door pickup
- Layout: Front-engine, rear-wheel-drive
- Related: Toyota Hilux (N50/N60/N70); Toyota Hilux (N80/N90/N100/N110)

Powertrain
- Engine: Petrol: 1.5 L 5K I4; 1.8 L 7K I4; 1.8 L 2Y I4 (Stallion); 2.0 L 1RZ-E I4 (Qualis); 2.2 L 4Y I4 (Stallion/Venture); Diesel: 2.0 L 2C I4 (Tamaraw); 2.4 L 2L-II I4 (Qualis/Stallion/Venture)
- Power output: 53 kW (71 hp; 72 PS) (5K); 59 kW (79 hp; 80 PS) (7K); 65 kW (87 hp; 88 PS) (2Y); 69 kW (93 hp; 94 PS) (1RZ-E); 51 kW (68 hp; 69 PS) (2C); 54 kW (72 hp; 73 PS) (2L-II)
- Transmission: 4-speed manual; 5-speed manual; 4-speed automatic

Dimensions
- Wheelbase: 2,300 mm (90.6 in) (SWB); 2,500 mm (98.4 in) (LWB)
- Length: 3,960 mm (156 in) (SWB pickup); 4,110–4,130 mm (161.8–162.6 in) (SWB wagon); 4,140–4,410 mm (163.0–173.6 in) (LWB pickup); 4,310–4,330 mm (169.7–170.5 in) (LWB wagon)
- Width: 1,620–1,655 mm (63.8–65.2 in)
- Height: 1,760–1,815 mm (69.3–71.5 in)
- Kerb weight: 1,035–1,540 kg (2,282–3,395 lb)

Introduced in November 1986, the third-generation Kijang was offered in short-wheelbase (F40 series) and long-wheelbase (F50 series) versions. The Kijang was redesigned to be larger and heavier, and no longer prioritised as a pickup truck-based model. The Standard trim level had a 4-speed manual transmission, while the Super variant had a 5-speed manual transmission and a better-equipped interior. Introduced in this generation was "Full Pressed Body" wagon built by companies appointed by Toyota. This technique was applied to reduce usage of putties up to 2–5 kg (4–11 lb) for each car.

The Kijang received its first facelift in August 1992. The steering mechanism was changed from recirculating ball to rack and pinion. The wagon model received a right-side rear door and adopted a new name, "Toyota Original Body", instead of "Full Pressed Body". In its creation process, it was fully pressed and used pointed welding. Up to this time, this model can be said as the one and only putty-free Kijang. The trim levels for the wagon model were:

- Standard (SX and LX; KF42 and KF52): a base model with 4-speed manual transmission, 13-inch steel wheels, standard dashboard, and no power features.
- Deluxe (SSX and LSX; KF42 and KF52): an upgraded version of the base Kijang with a refined dashboard, better quality interior materials, 13-inch steel wheels with covers, single air conditioning, basic audio system with a radio receiver.
- Super G or G-series Kijang (SSX-G and LSX-G; KF42 and KF52): similar to the Deluxe trim, adds power steering and seat belts as standard equipment.
- Grand Extra (SGX and LGX; KF42 and KF52): the top-of-the-range model with double blower air conditioning, Enkei 14-inch alloy wheels, overfenders, suede-covered door trim and seats, power steering, front power windows, digital clock, tachometer, 4 speaker audio system with a tape deck and radio receiver (CD player available as optional), alarm and central door locks.
- Rover: Coach-built model with a restyled body resembling the 70-series Land Cruiser available either as a 4-door (Rover) or 5-door (Grand Rover) wagon in either short or long wheelbase. Front Reclining seats and folding middle seats are standard on all trims while super variants include headrests, Console Box, and footsteps as standard equipment. Air conditioning and a radio/cassette are available as options. Power steering was later added with the 1992 refresh with the 4-door Rover model subsequently being discontinued and the model name was later changed to "RoverAce" after receiving objections from the British automobile manufacturer Rover.
- Jantan: Higher-end trim variant to the Kijang Rover that was first introduced in executive trim which added wood trim, power windows to all four seats, front and rear air conditioning, 4 speaker audio system, central locking, and alloy wheels. An entry-level G variant and a 4x2 (short only) sporty variant was introduced alongside the original executive variant. The 4x2 adds a larger rear door that covers the full width of the vehicle and a door-mounted spare wheel, however it does not have rear air conditioning.
- Kencana (KF42 and KF52): a coach-built model based on Kijang Rover/Jantan with higher roof and higher ground clearance. This model retains the side-opening rear door of low roof models instead of the liftgate received by international high roof models.
- Perkasa: 2-door, coach-built model with a removable fiberglass canopy

In April 1995, the Kijang received a second facelift, including a redesigned grille with vertical bars, usage of Enkei 14-inch alloy wheels on the G-series Kijang and the Supra A70/A80-styled five spoke, 14-inch alloy wheels on the Grand Extra Kijang, redesigned steering wheel, addition of tachometers, central door lock and power windows for Deluxe trim, and larger 1.8-litre 7K engine. With the introduction of the 7K engine, the production of the 5K engine was completely stopped.

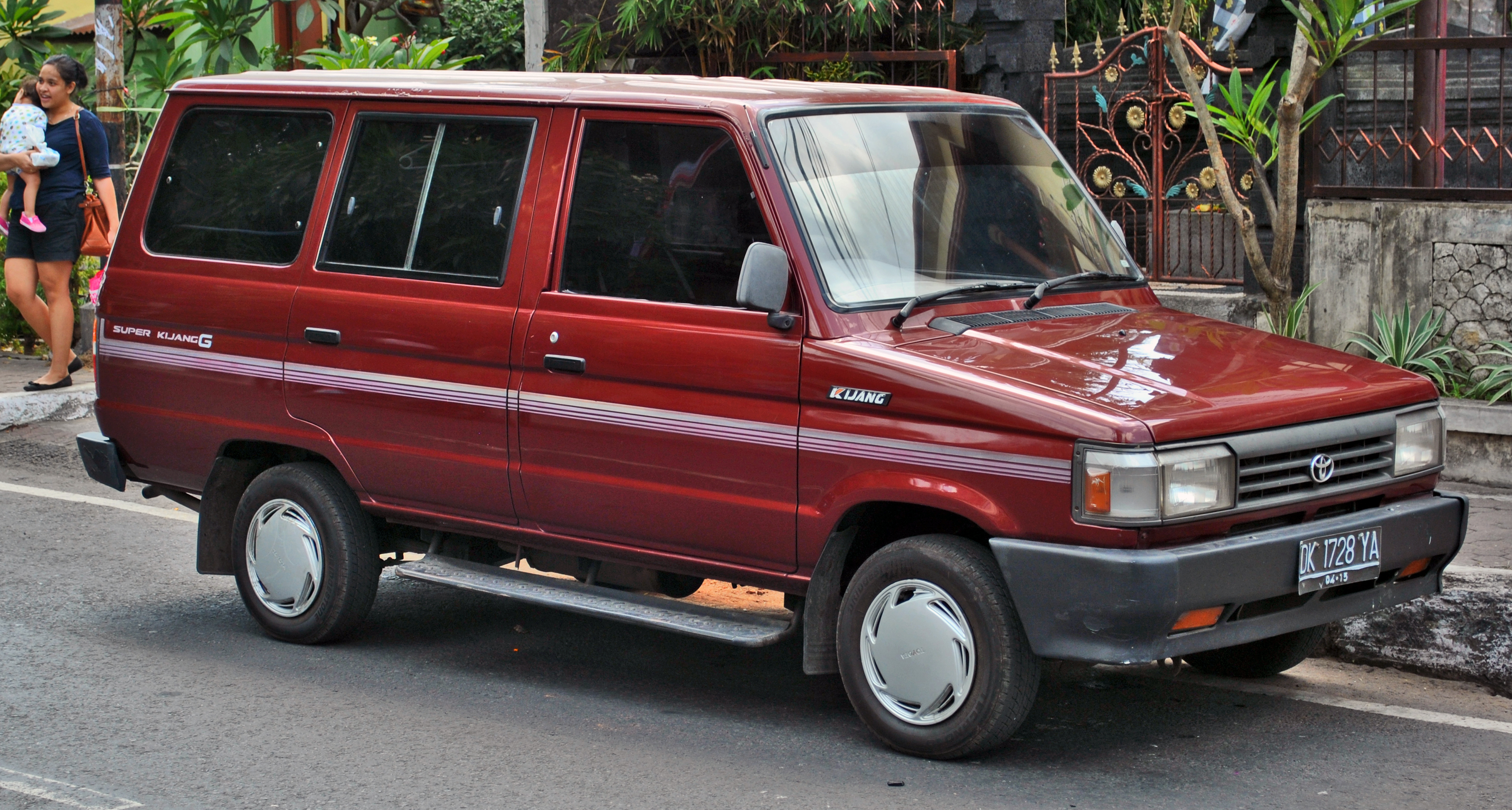
1992 Toyota Kijang Deluxe LSX-G (KF52; first facelift, Indonesia)

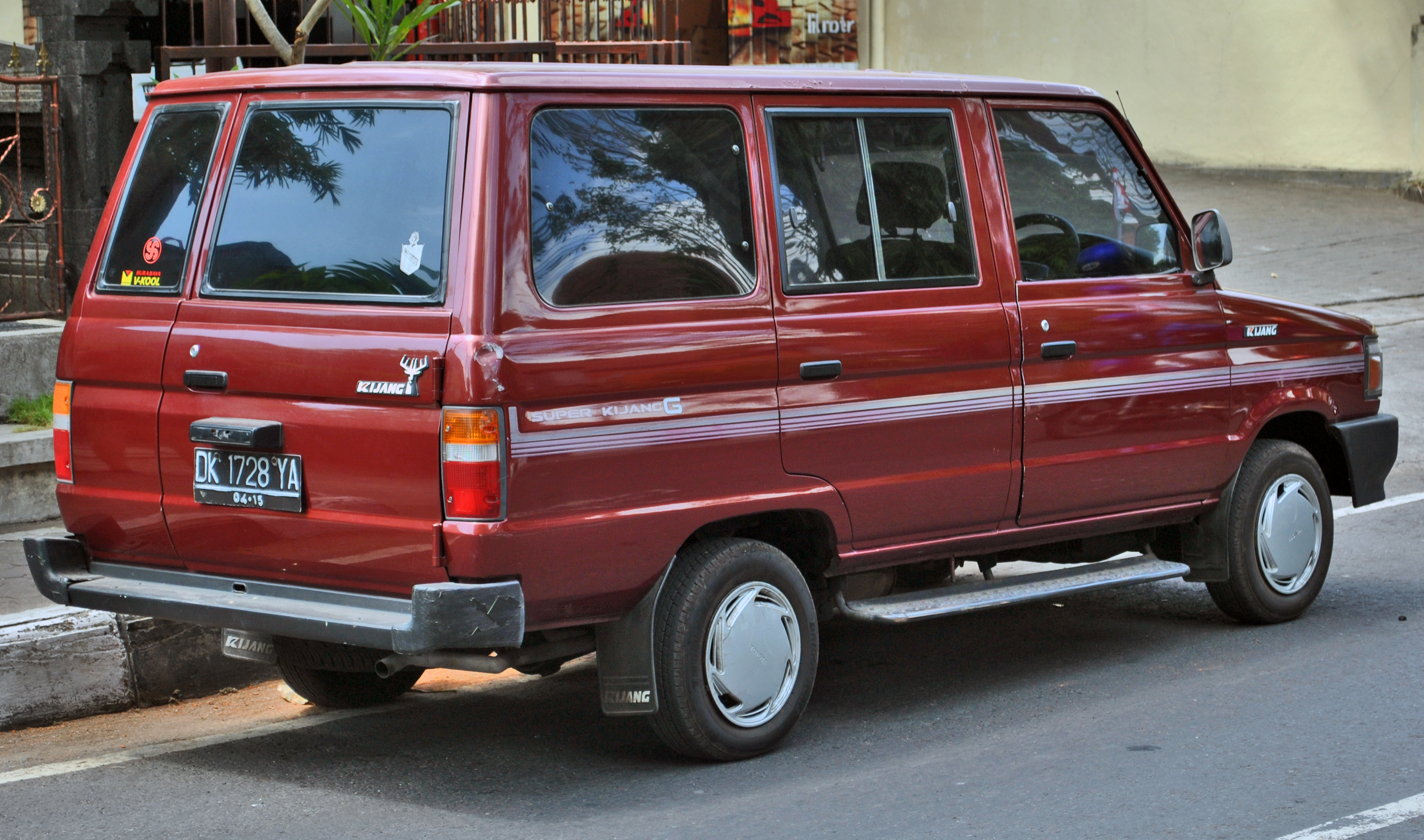
1992 Toyota Kijang Deluxe LSX-G (KF52; first facelift, Indonesia)

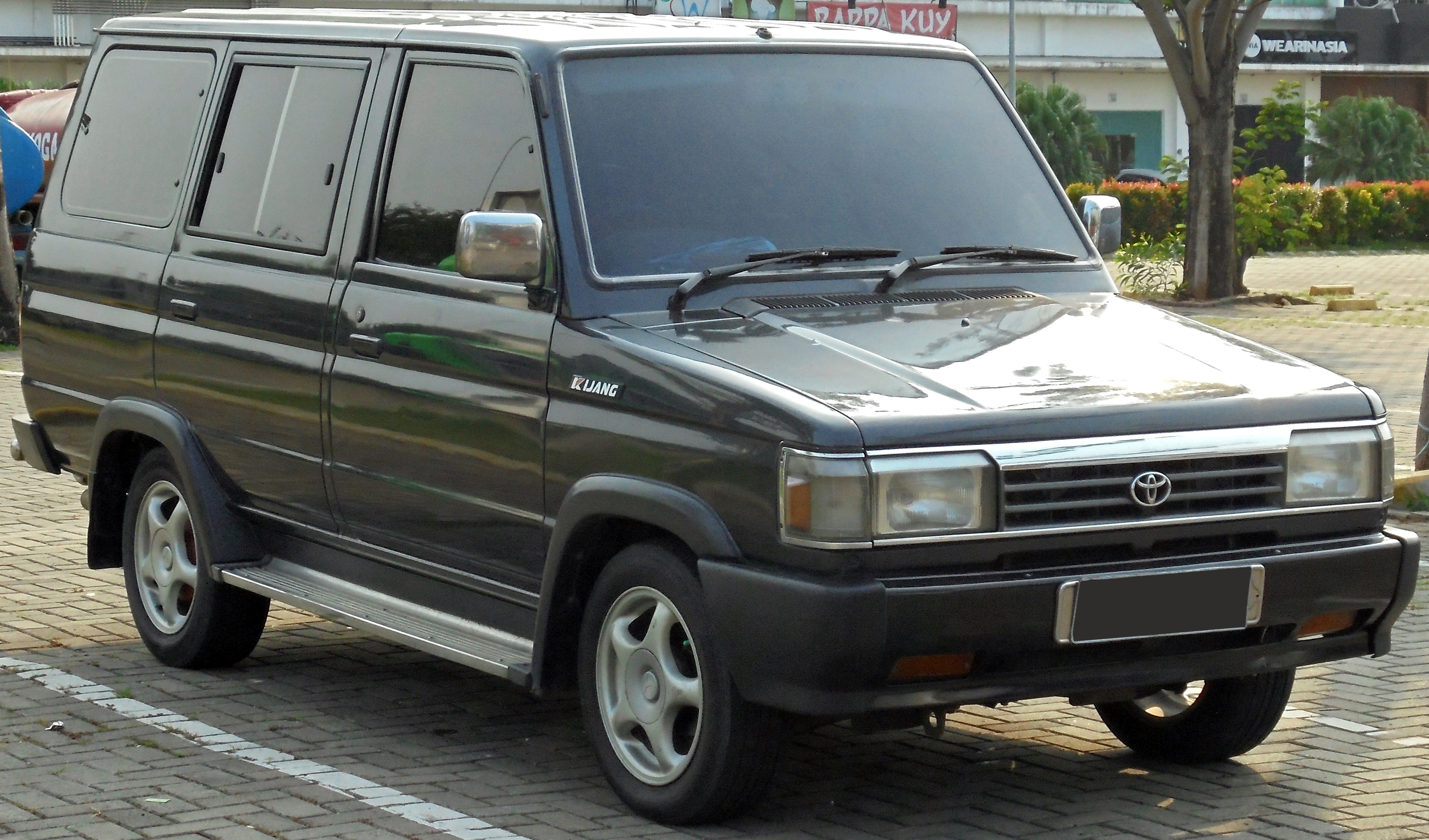
Toyota Kijang Grand Extra LGX (KF52; first facelift, Indonesia)

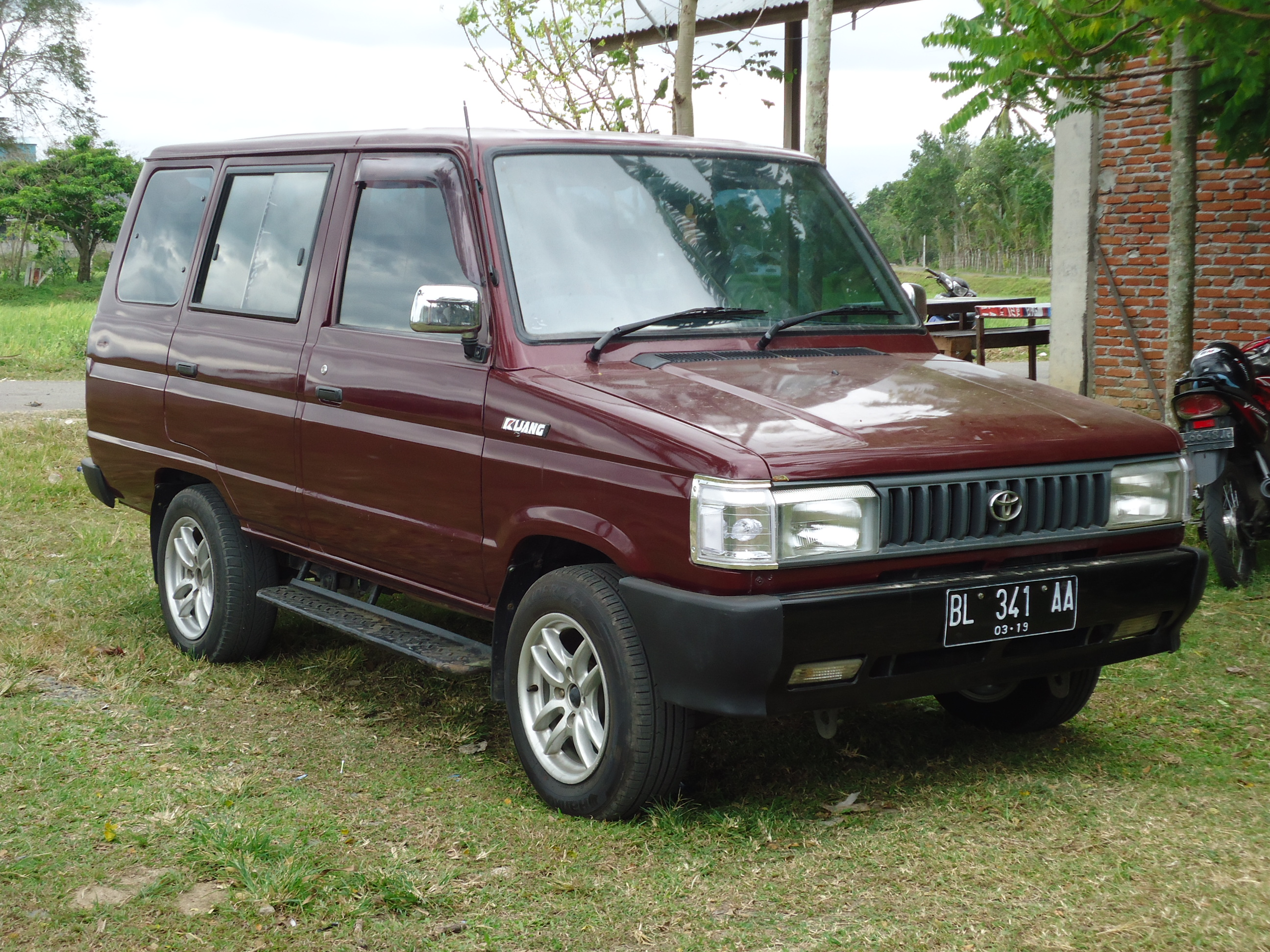
Toyota Kijang Deluxe SSX (KF42; second facelift, Indonesia)

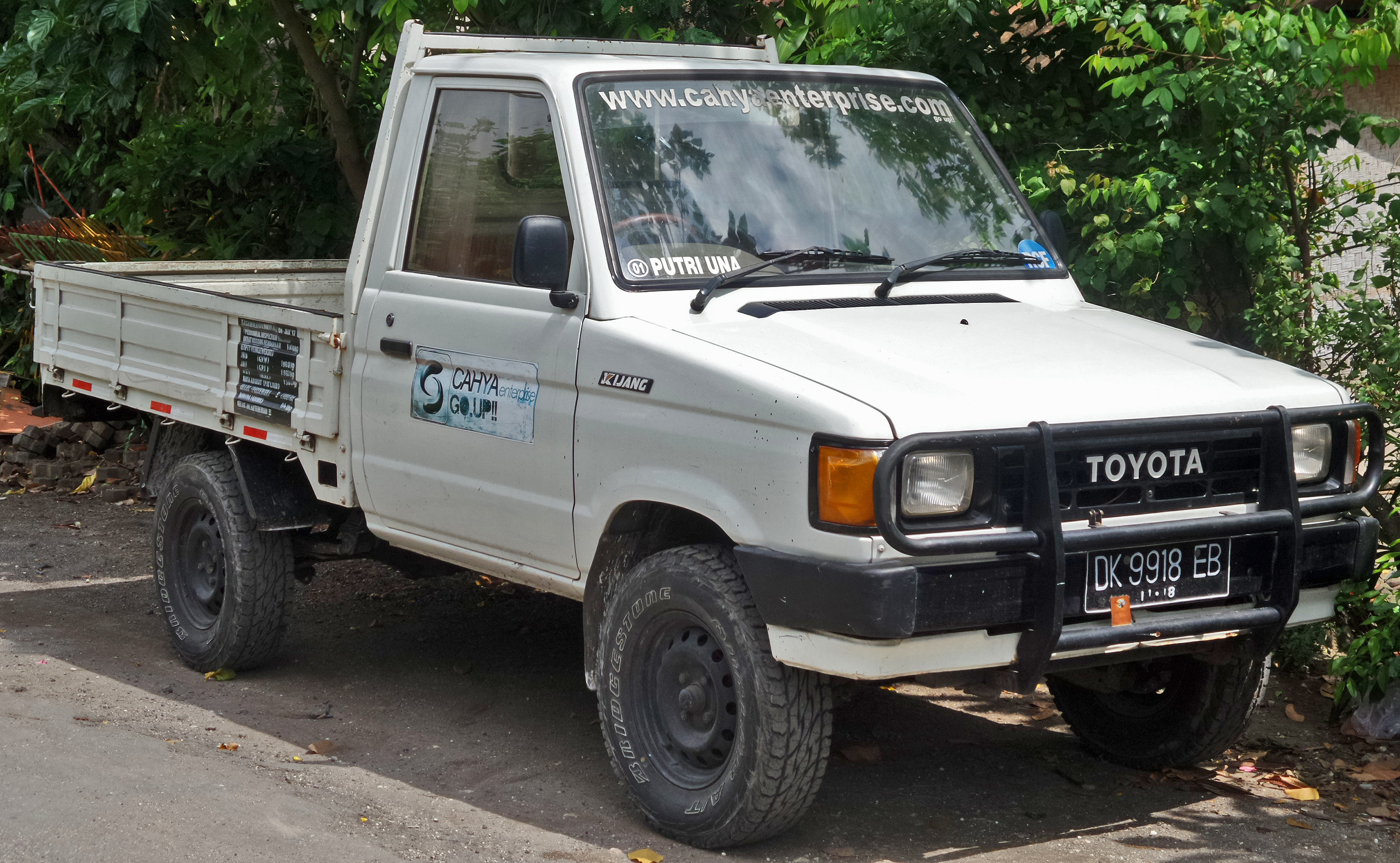
Toyota Kijang pickup (Indonesia)

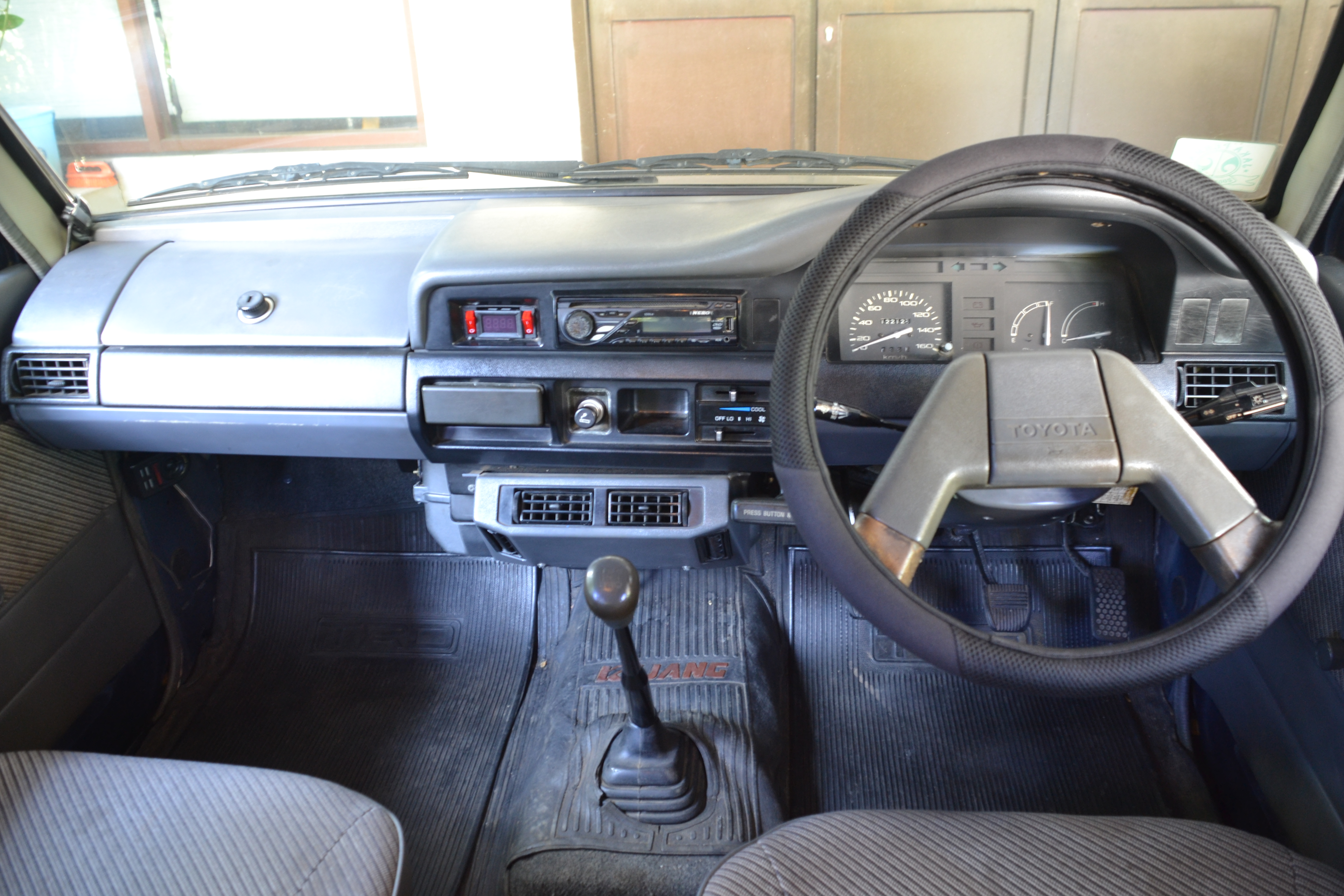
1992 Toyota Kijang SSX interior, with an aftermarket head unit and steering wheel cover

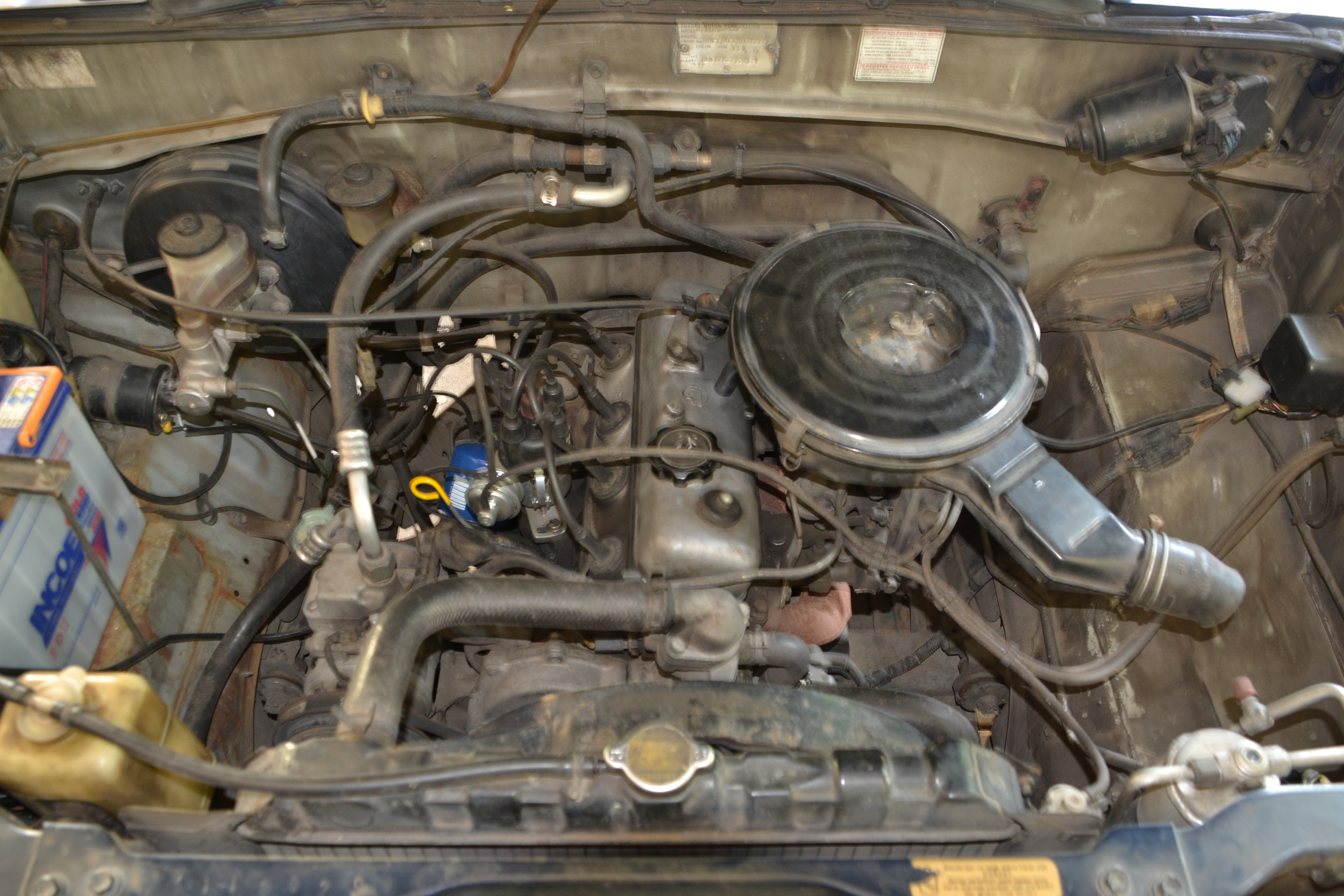
1.5 L 5K engine in the 1992 Kijang

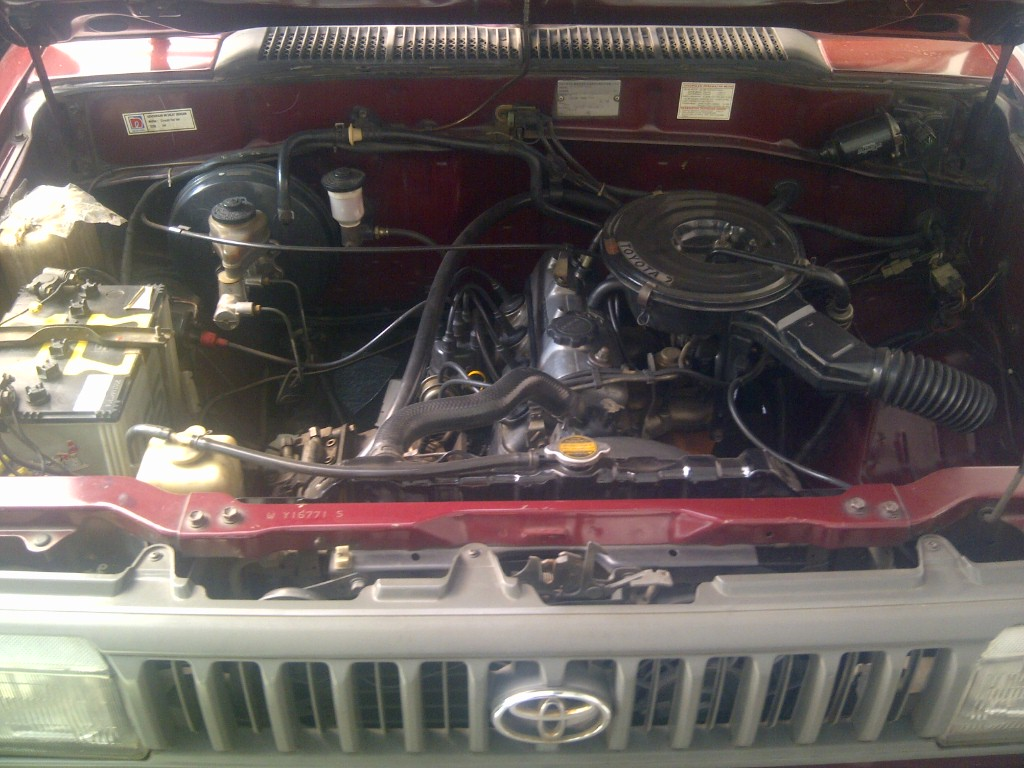
1.8 L 7K engine in the 1995 Kijang

=== Tamaraw FX (Philippines) ===
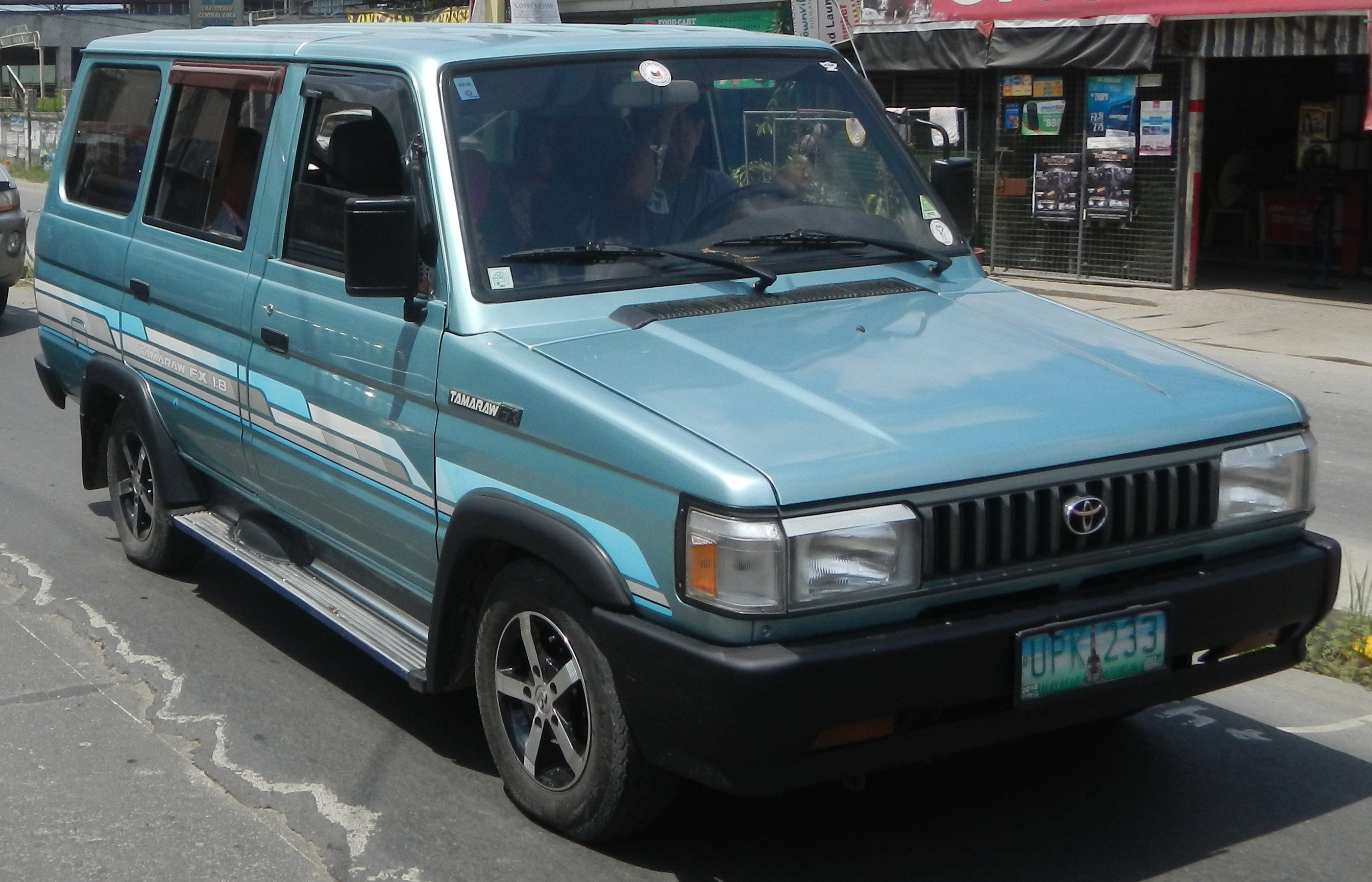
Toyota Tamaraw FX GL (Philippines)

In the Philippines, versions of the Kijang were sold as the Tamaraw FX when it was introduced in 1991 as a high side pickup and in 1993 as a wagon. The Tamaraw FX was available either with a 1.5 5K petrol engine, a 1.8-litre 7K petrol engine or a 2.0-litre 2C diesel engine, all coupled with a 5-speed manual transmission. Power was 59 kW (79 hp; 80 PS) and 51 kW (68 hp; 69 PS) respectively, allowing for top speeds of 130 or 125 km/h (81 or 78 mph). The Tamaraw FX was offered in 5 door long wheelbase wagon in either Standard, Deluxe and GL trim levels. The GL trim included power steering, cloth interior, cloth seats, a digital clock, door pocket, a 4 speaker cassette radio, body cladding and 14 inch alloy wheels. Deluxe and standard models had steel wheels, 2 speaker cassette decks, and vinyl interiors, however deluxe models received full width side steps and bucket front seats. Dual AC was standard on all wagon models. The pickup variant was available in 11-seater high side pickup form and later in chassis cab configuration. In 2000, Deluxe, GL, and diesel wagon variants were discontinued leaving only the 1.8 standard wagon and pickup variants to be sold alongside the Revo until 2002 when the Tamaraw was finally discontinued.

The Tamaraw FX was meant for use as a passenger wagon. It still retained the ruggedness of the old Tamaraw and is ideal for rough roads and carrying heavy loads. It was assembled by Toyota Motor Philippines in its Parañaque plant that was formerly operated by Delta Motors with the pickup version rolled-out off the assembly line in October 1991 and the wagon version in December 1993. Also around that time, after Ford left the Philippines in 1984, Pilipinas Nissan bought the rights to produce the Fiera IV under the name Nissan Bida; and local car assembler Carter Motors came up with their own version, the Masa (Tagalog for "masses", implying that the car is within reach of the masses). The Tamaraw FW was also widely used by metered taxis and the point-to-point UV Express system, leading to the colloquial use of the term "FX" to refer to UV Express vehicles regardless of the actual make or model.

=== Zace (Vietnam and Taiwan) ===
The Kijang was sold in Vietnam and Taiwan under the Zace name. Introduced in Taiwan in 1988 the station wagon model was offered in either low roof long-wheelbase wagon with regular side-opening rear door and a high roof version lift gate variant while a pickup variant was also offered with a choice of either a 1.5L (5K) or 1.8 (7K) engine. The Taiwanese market Zace wagons was offered in either 5/8 seater configurations. The Vietnamese market Zace only had an 8-seater configuration.

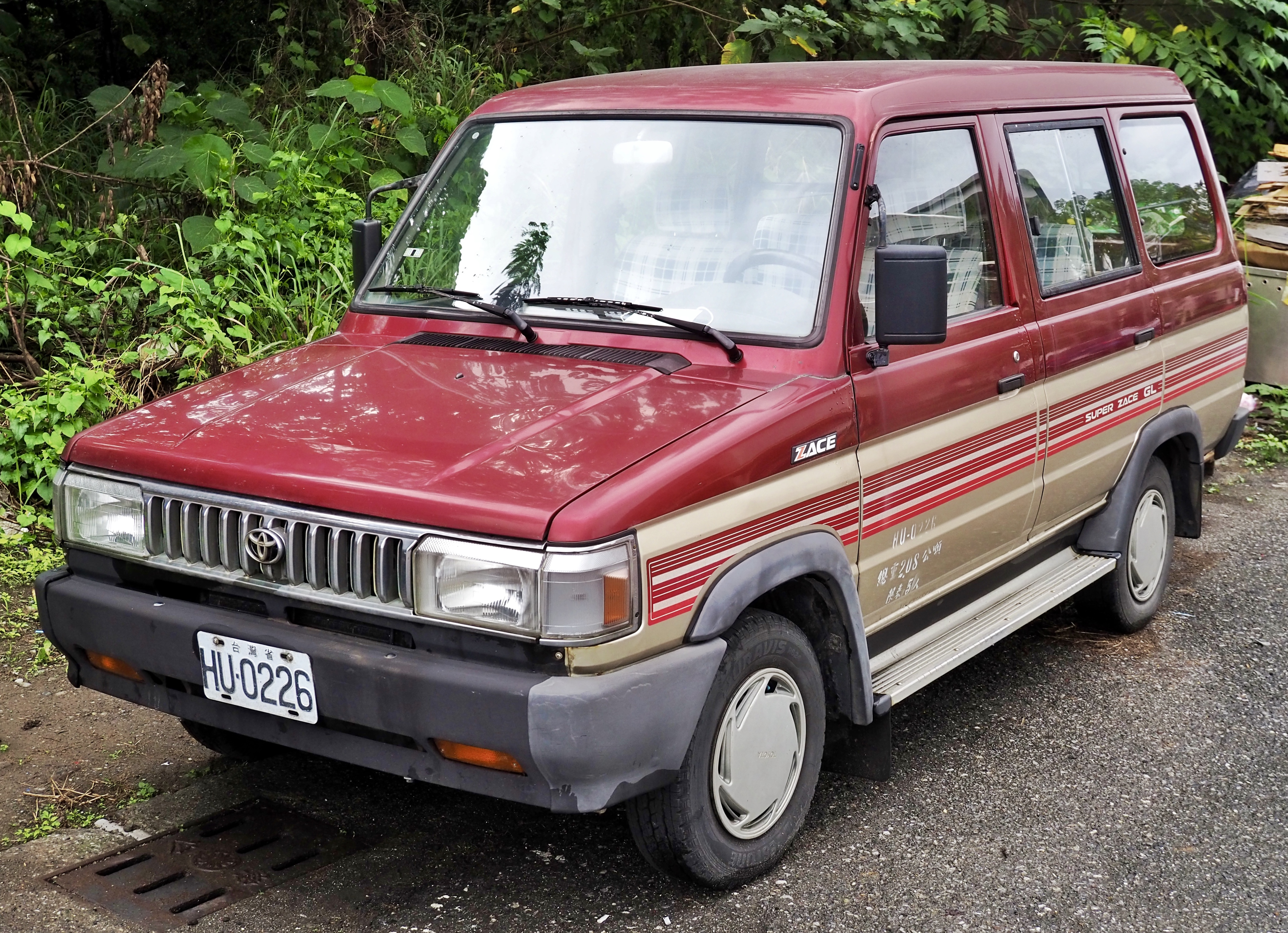
Toyota Zace (second facelift, Taiwan)

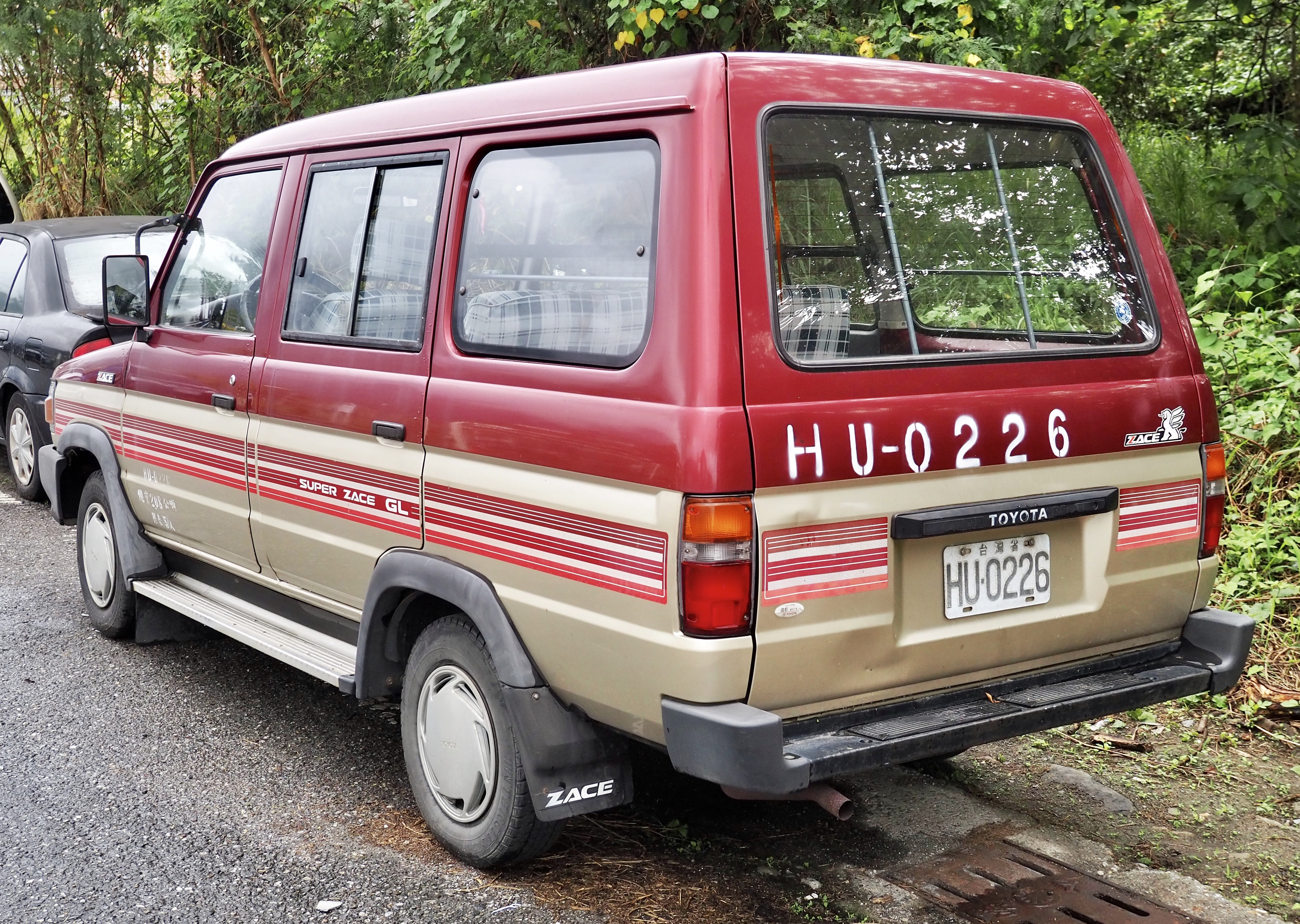
Toyota Zace (second facelift, Taiwan)

=== Venture/Stallion (South Africa) ===
The Kijang was built and sold in South Africa in three body styles as the High roof station wagon Venture, or as a commercial vehicle under the Stallion nameplate available either as a panel van or pickup truck. The advertising campaign for the Stallion had local Afrikaans comedian Tolla van der Merwe, and because of his popularity it is commonly called the "Tolla bakkie".

The Venture was available with three engine choices: a 1.8 (2Y) petrol, 2.2 (4Y) petrol, and a 2.4 (2L) diesel. Standard equipment includes Gear lock, Rear wiper and Washer, Power steering (unavailable with the 1.8 petrol engine), Air conditioning (available for 2.2-engined models only), and a ten-seat configuration. 2.2 Engine models also include an immobiliser alarm as standard (optional on 1.8 and 2.4D models) while the range-topping 2.2 GLE adds a 9-seater configuration, central locking, and makes a cassette radio standard equipment (optional on other variants). A rear differential lock is an available option for 2.4D and 2.2GLE models.

The Stallion was available in either Panel van or as a Single Cab Truck with a 1.8 (2Y) petrol engine mated to a 4-Speed Manual while the 2.4 (2L) diesel was available for the pickup body style with a 5-speed manual transmission as an option. The Pickup Variants van also be optioned to be delivered as a chassis cab while the 1.8 pickup is also offered with optional 14" alloy wheels.

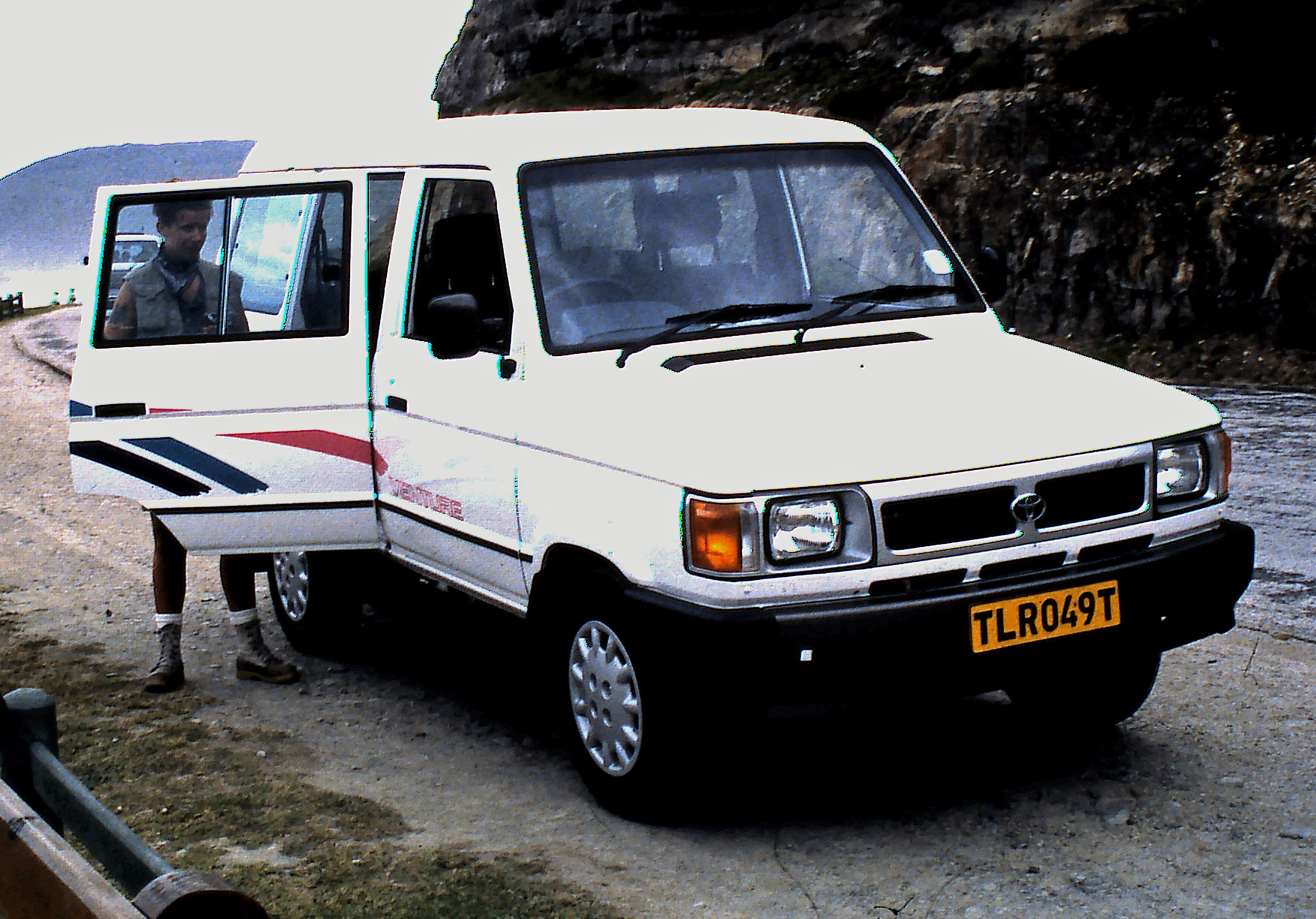
Toyota Venture van (South Africa)

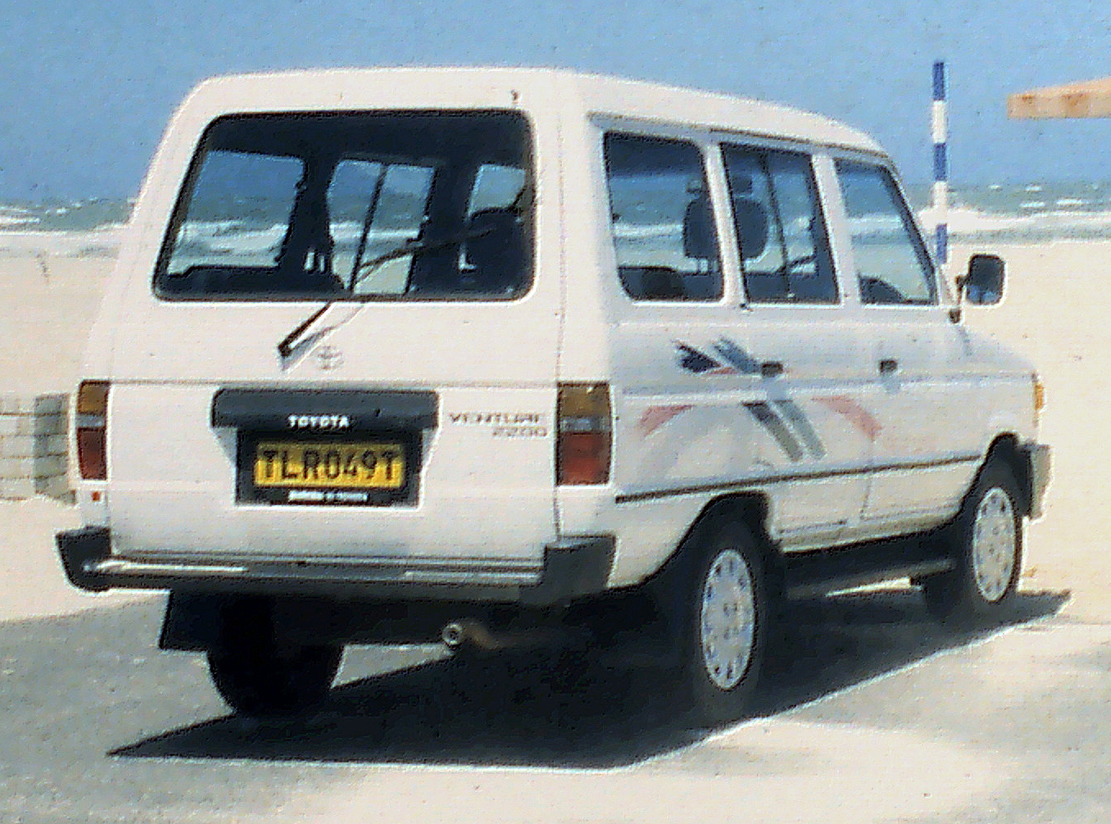
Toyota Venture van (South Africa)

=== Qualis (India) ===
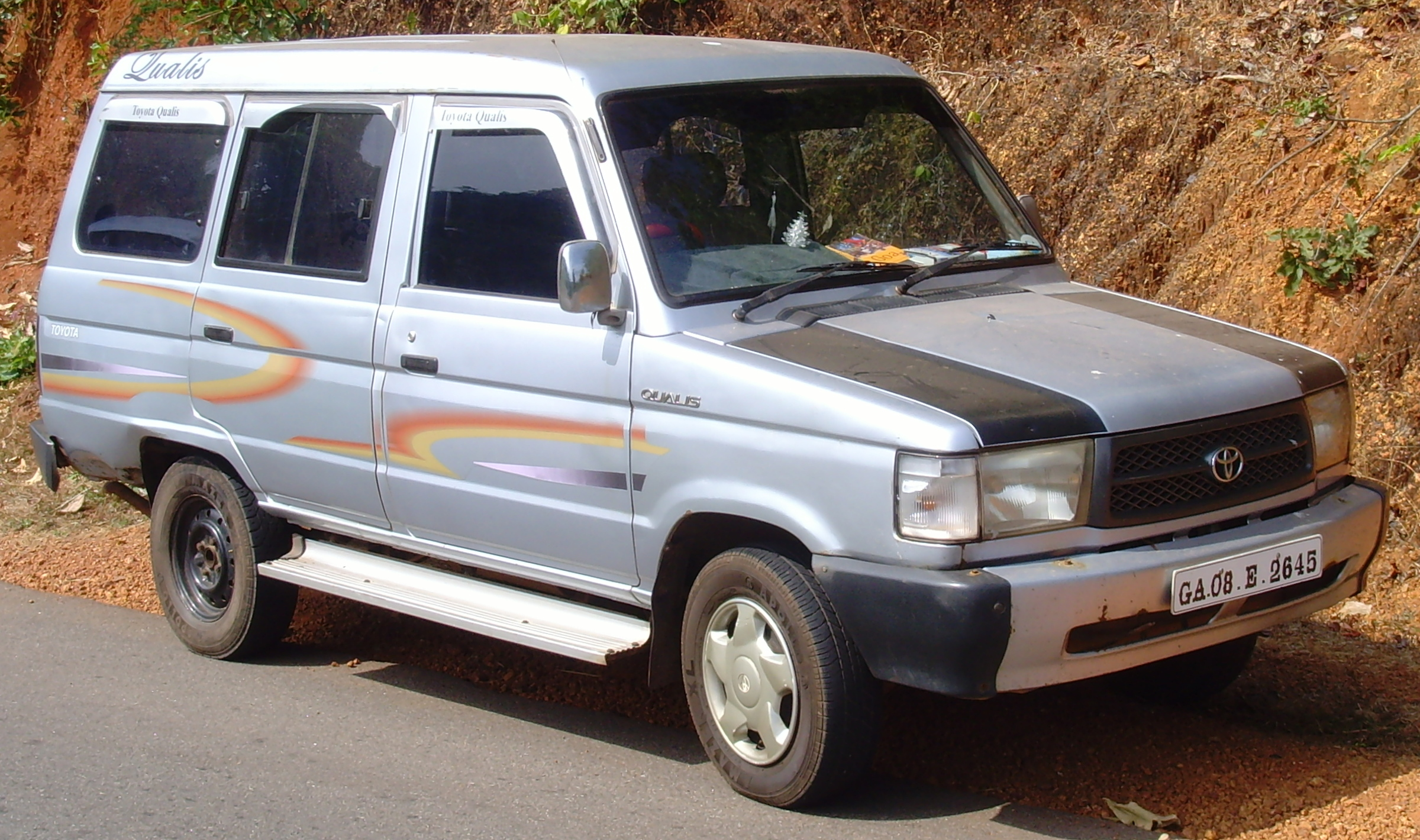
Toyota Qualis FS (India)

The third-generation Kijang was launched in India in January 2000 as Toyota's first entry into India's automobile market following a joint venture with the Kirloskar Group in 1997. The Kijang was sold in India under the Qualis name. The Qualis was based on the third-generation global model, but updated with front and rear styling, an updated interior making use of the switch gear, instrument cluster and rear air conditioning blower unit from the fourth-generation Kijang. Critics said the vehicle was outdated that came with an outdated design and did not expect it to sell well. However, Qualis was a hit as the vehicle was welcomed by taxi companies, fleet operators and large Indian families over others like Tata's Sumo and Mahindra's Bolero.

The Qualis was initially sold only with a 2.4-litre 2L-II SOHC diesel upon its introduction in 2000 in FS/GS/GST trims while the fuel-injected 2.0-litre 1RZ-E SOHC petrol engine was later made available in the range topping GST Super. The FS model (10-seater) is the base trim with a vinyl interior, power steering and front air conditioning (later included in refreshed models as standard) as options. The middle grade GS trim (10 seater/8 seater) gets better cloth interior with better sound deadening, power steering, front air conditioning (rear AC available as an option), and body cladding as standard with power windows and central locking offered as options. The top-end 8 seater GST and the petrol GST Super included front fog lamps, rear wiper and washer, wood trim, rear spoiler, alloy wheels, and all GS options as standard. The model range would get revamped in 2002 that brought roll down windows to the second-row doors with power windows for all four doors and central locking being standard to the now 8 seater only GS variant with rear AC and rear wiper and washer offered as options while the range topping GST/GST Super was replaced by a new 7-seater RS variant with captain seats.

The Qualis was discontinued in January 2005.

== Fourth generation (F60/F70/F80; 1997) ==
Fourth generation
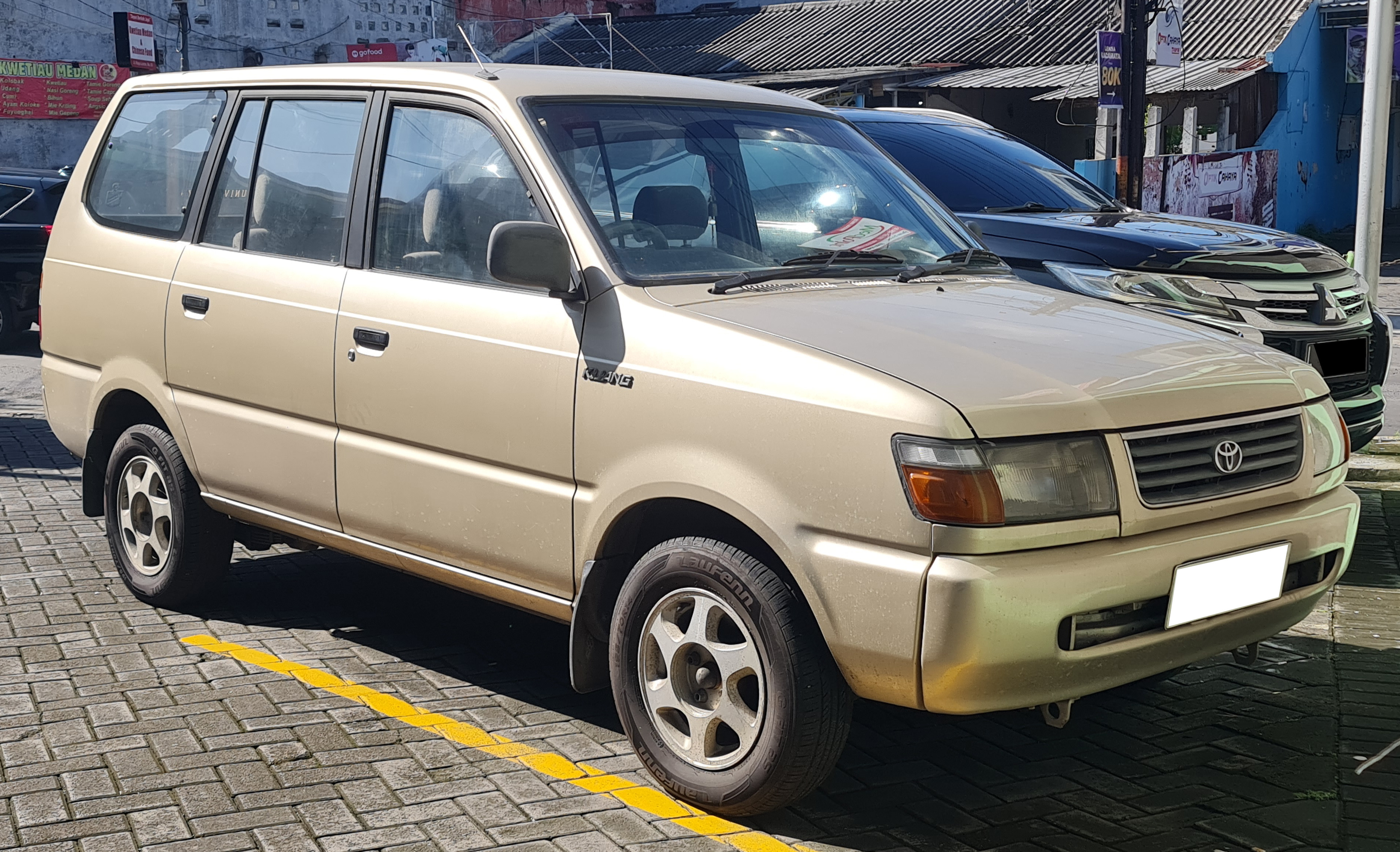
- 1997 Toyota Kijang LGX 2.4 Diesel (LF82; pre-facelift, Indonesia)

Overview
- Model code: F60 (pickup truck); F70 (short-wheelbase); F80 (long-wheelbase)
- Also called: Toyota Tamaraw FX Revo (Philippines); Toyota Unser (Malaysia); Toyota Zace (Vietnam); Toyota Zace Surf (Taiwan); Toyota Condor (African markets); Toyota Stallion (South Africa)
- Production: December 1996 – June 2004 (wagon, Indonesia); December 1996 – February 2005 (pickup, Indonesia); 1998–2005 (Philippines); 1998–2007 (Taiwan); 2000–2005 (South Africa)
- Assembly: Indonesia: Sunter, North Jakarta; Karawang, West Java (Multi Astra/TAM/TMMIN); Malaysia: Shah Alam, Selangor (UMWT); Philippines: Santa Rosa, Laguna (TMP); South Africa: Prospecton (TSAM); Taiwan: Guanyin (Kuozui Motors); Vietnam: Hanoi (TMV)

Body and chassis
- Class: Compact station wagon; Compact pickup truck
- Body style: 5-door wagon/van; 2-door pickup
- Layout: Front-engine, rear-wheel-drive; Front-engine, full-time four-wheel-drive
- Related: Toyota Hilux (N140/N150/N160/N170)

Powertrain
- Engine: Petrol: 1.8 L 7K I4; 1.8 L 7K-E I4; 1.8 L 2Y I4; 2.0 L 1RZ-E I4; 2.4 L 2RZ-E I4 (Condor/Zace Surf); Diesel: 2.4 L 2L-II I4; 3.0 L 5L I4 (Condor)
- Power output: 59 kW (79 hp; 80 PS) (7K); 62 kW (83 hp; 84 PS) (7K-E); 65 kW (87 hp; 88 PS) (2Y); 71 kW (95 hp; 97 PS) (1RZ-E); 85 kW (114 hp; 116 PS) (2RZ-E); 61 kW (82 hp; 83 PS) (2L-II); 66 kW (89 hp; 90 PS) (5L)
- Transmission: 4-speed manual; 5-speed manual; 4-speed automatic

Dimensions
- Wheelbase: 2,400 mm (94.5 in) (SWB); 2,650 mm (104.3 in) (LWB, pickup)
- Length: 4,155–4,270 mm (163.6–168.1 in) (SWB); 4,405–4,535 mm (173.4–178.5 in) (LWB); 4,455–4,685 mm (175.4–184.4 in) (pickup)
- Width: 1,670–1,720 mm (65.7–67.7 in)
- Height: 1,740–1,820 mm (68.5–71.7 in)
- Kerb weight: 1,100–1,685 kg (2,425–3,715 lb)

=== Indonesia ===
On 15 January 1997, the fourth-generation Kijang was launched in Indonesia with a more rounded, aerodynamic shape. It was originally planned to be introduced in 2000, but since Mitsubishi planned to introduce the Kuda in 1998, the Kijang was instead launched three years in advance. It was more powerful and more refined than its predecessors. The wagon model, often colloquially known as "Kijang Kapsul" (Indonesian for "Capsule Kijang"), was designated either the F70 series (short wheelbase) or the F80 series (long wheelbase), and features a rear liftgate rather than a side-opening rear door, with some coachbuild versions still retain the latter. The pickup model was designated as the F60 series. For the first time, the 2L diesel-powered Kijang was offered. Either the carburetted 7K or the fuel-injected 7K-E-powered Kijang was the most popular model due to its low maintenance cost, despite being underpowered compared to the 2.0-litre 1RZ-E unit. It was built on the same platform as the sixth-generation Hilux. The Kijang received facelifts on 1 February 2000 and 23 August 2002, respectively.

The fourth-generation wagon model Kijangs were generally released in four different trim levels, depending on wheelbase options:

- SX (F70/71/72) and LX (F80/81/82): Standard model without air conditioning, cassette tape player, power windows, tachometer, sun visor and other amenities. The 1997-2000 model have a fixed front passenger seat and a 4-speed manual transmission as opposed to 5-speed in other trim levels. Both were available with the 1.8 litre petrol engine and 2.4 litre diesel engine. The facelifted SX and LX retains the carburetted petrol and diesel engines but upgraded the transmission to 5-speed. Equivalent to the "Standard" trim of previous generation.
- SSX (F70/71/72) and LSX (F80/81/82): Deluxe model, equipped with air conditioning, cassette tape player and tachometer. power windows, fog lamp, and double blower as an optional. Both also have distinctive 14-inch alloy wheels from Enkei as an optional since 1998 (6-spoke on SSX and 5-spoke on LSX). Equivalent to the "Deluxe" and "Super G" trim of previous generation, it was branded as "Deluxe and "Hi-G" for this generation. Both the SSX and LSX were available with the petrol and diesel engine but at some time later they removed the diesel options for SSX. There is only a 5-speed manual transmission option, as the Deluxe model does not have an automatic transmission. The facelifted SSX and LSX were equipped with electric mirrors and replaced the 1.8 carburetted engine with a 1.8 EFI petrol engine as the new standard, but retains the same 2.4 diesel engine.
- SGX (F70/71/72) and LGX (F80/81/82): Grand model, equipped with double-blower air conditioning, cassette tape/CD player, power windows, 14-inch alloy wheels with distinctive design on both variants (3-spoke on SGX and 6-spoke on LGX), rear window wiper, exterior garnish and diesel engine option (LGX model only). A 4-speed automatic transmission option is also offered in the SGX and LGX model, being the first Kijang to have an automatic transmission. Both were available with the 1.8 litre petrol engine, with the 2.4 litre diesel engine available on LGX only, equivalent to the "Grand Extra" trim of the previous generation.
- Rangga (F70): SUV-inspired version for the short wheelbase model, similar to SSX trim but equipped with SUV-inspired body kit, features a higher ground clearance, rear-mounted spare tyre and refined interior with suede seat cover and door trim. This trim is only offered in the pre-facelift model and powered with 1.8 carbureted petrol engine. Equivalent to the "Rover" trim of previous generation.
- Krista (F80/81/82): Top trim for the long wheelbase model, similar to LGX trim but only available in blue, red, black, silver or green colour option, equipped with body kit and refined interior; the trim also included specially-made door trim and center console. Unlike the LGX, the 1997–2000 Krista trim had no automatic transmission option. The 2000 facelifted Krista has an upgrade with automatic transmission options, 2.4 litre diesel engine and 1.8 litre EFI petrol engine (later replaced by the 2.0 litre EFI petrol engine) and was equivalent to the "Kencana" and "Jantan" trim of the previous generation.

The pickup model was offered in Standard Deck and Flat Deck variants, both available with the 1.8 litre carburetted petrol engine and 2.4 litre diesel engine.

Some versions called Grand Rover Ace and Jantan Raider, which were made by local coachbuilders, were sold only in a few units. The Grand Rover Ace is based on the LSX trim and has an SUV-like body, resembling the J80 series Land Cruiser in a similar fashion to the facelifted EP81 Starlet which resembles the Japanese market Starlet GT Turbo.

In the 2020s era, the Kijang SSX Diesel, Kijang Jantan Raider, Kijang Grand Rover Ace, Kijang Rangga, Kijang Krista 1.8 EFI, and Kijang Krista 2.4 Diesel automatic have become highly sought-after by collectors due to their extreme rarity and brief production runs.

The short wheelbase wagon has a 7-seat capacity using jumpseats in the rear while the 8-seater long wheelbase wagon uses a bench-type front facing third row seats albeit without seatbelts.

The fourth-generation Kijang has undergone several changes:

- Pre-facelift (January 1997 – January 2000): The bumpers and side skirts are still made of steel. The window was still equipped with a rubber seal. It used either a 1.8-litre 7K petrol engine or a 2.4-litre 2L diesel engine option. The lowest trim, SX and LX, is offered with a 4-speed manual transmission as opposed to 5-speed seen in higher trims. Automatic transmission option was only available in the LGX trim. The Krista trim is the only one to offer an electric mirror. All trims have two-spoke steering wheel.
- First facelift (February 2000 – August 2002): Thinner body-steel was used to decrease production cost; therefore, this model was sold as the same price as the pre-facelift model. The front and rear fascias got some redesigns. It used compound sealant for the rear window, while the front windscreen was still using rubber seals. The design of the front panel was slightly changed (mostly on the driver's side). For this model (and upwards) customers could choose which engine option they wanted to use – a 1.8-litre 7K-E petrol engine, a 2.0-litre 1RZ-E petrol engine or a 2.4-litre 2L diesel engine. The 2.0-litre engine option was offered in the LGX and Krista trims from 6 September 2000 (introduced at the 10th Gaikindo Auto Expo). SGX/LGX and Krista trims received three-spoke steering wheel while SX/LX and SSX/LSX trims retained two-spoke steering wheel from the pre-facelift model. The SSX/LSX trim received Enkei 14-inch alloy as an option and electric mirrors came standard on SGX/LGX and Krista trims. The SX/LX trim received a 5-speed manual transmission, and automatic transmission is made available on the Krista trim.
- Second facelift (August 2002 – August 2004): The grille received a redesign with vertical slats and the rear fascia is equipped with rear garnish in some variants. The SGX/LGX and Krista trims are equipped with suede door trim (the older model ones used cloth trim) and the rear power window buttons are integrated to the door armrests. The interior changed into full beige colour (as opposed to grey in previous versions) and the three-spoke steering wheel for the SGX/LGX and Krista trims were redesigned to resemble the one seen in Toyota Vios. Engine choices remained the same, except that the Krista trim is no longer offered with the 1.8L 7K-E engine. This facelift also received newly redesigned alloy wheels for SSX/LSX, SGX/LGX, and Krista trims.

The production of fourth-generation Kijang wagon ended on 19 June 2004 with a total production of 452,017 units. The pickup truck variant continued to sold until February 2005.

Pre-facelift

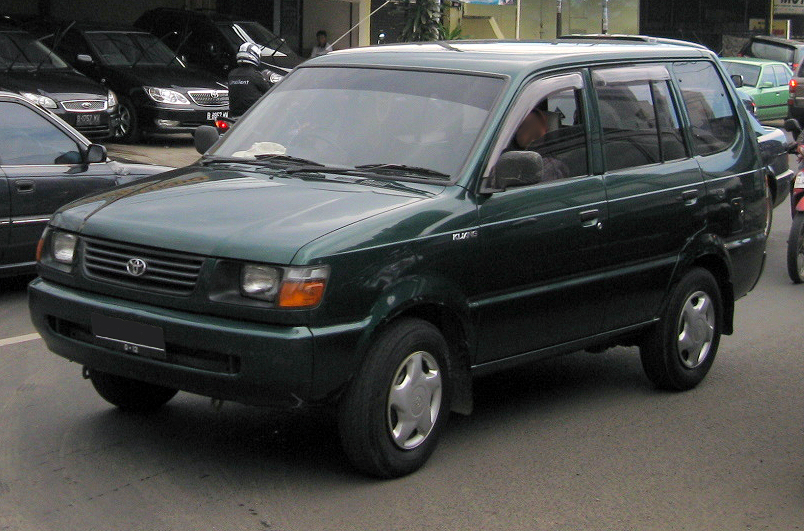
1997 Toyota Kijang SX 1.8 (KF70, Indonesia)

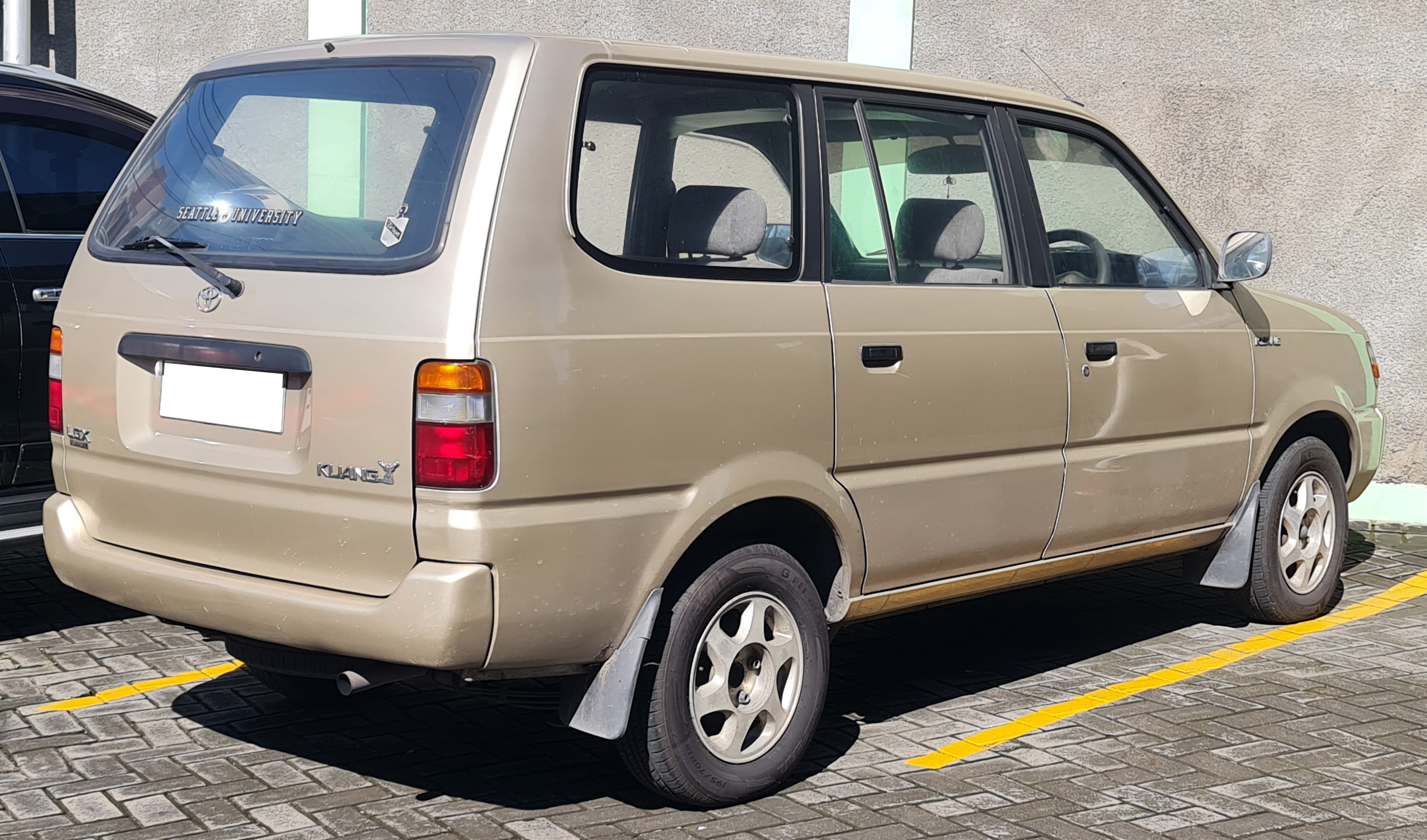
1997 Toyota Kijang LGX 2.4 Diesel (LF82, Indonesia)

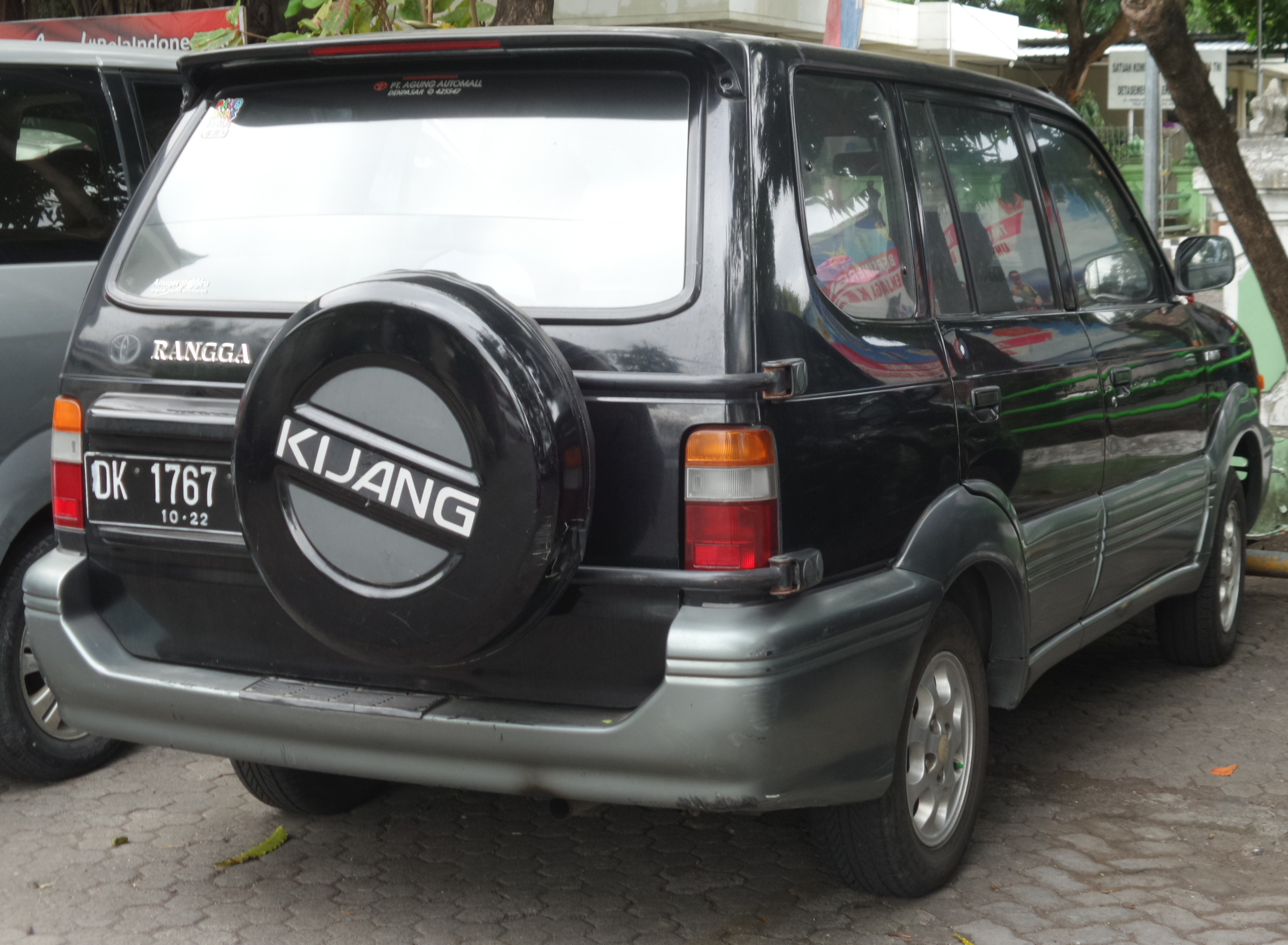
1997 Toyota Kijang Rangga 1.8 (KF70, Indonesia)

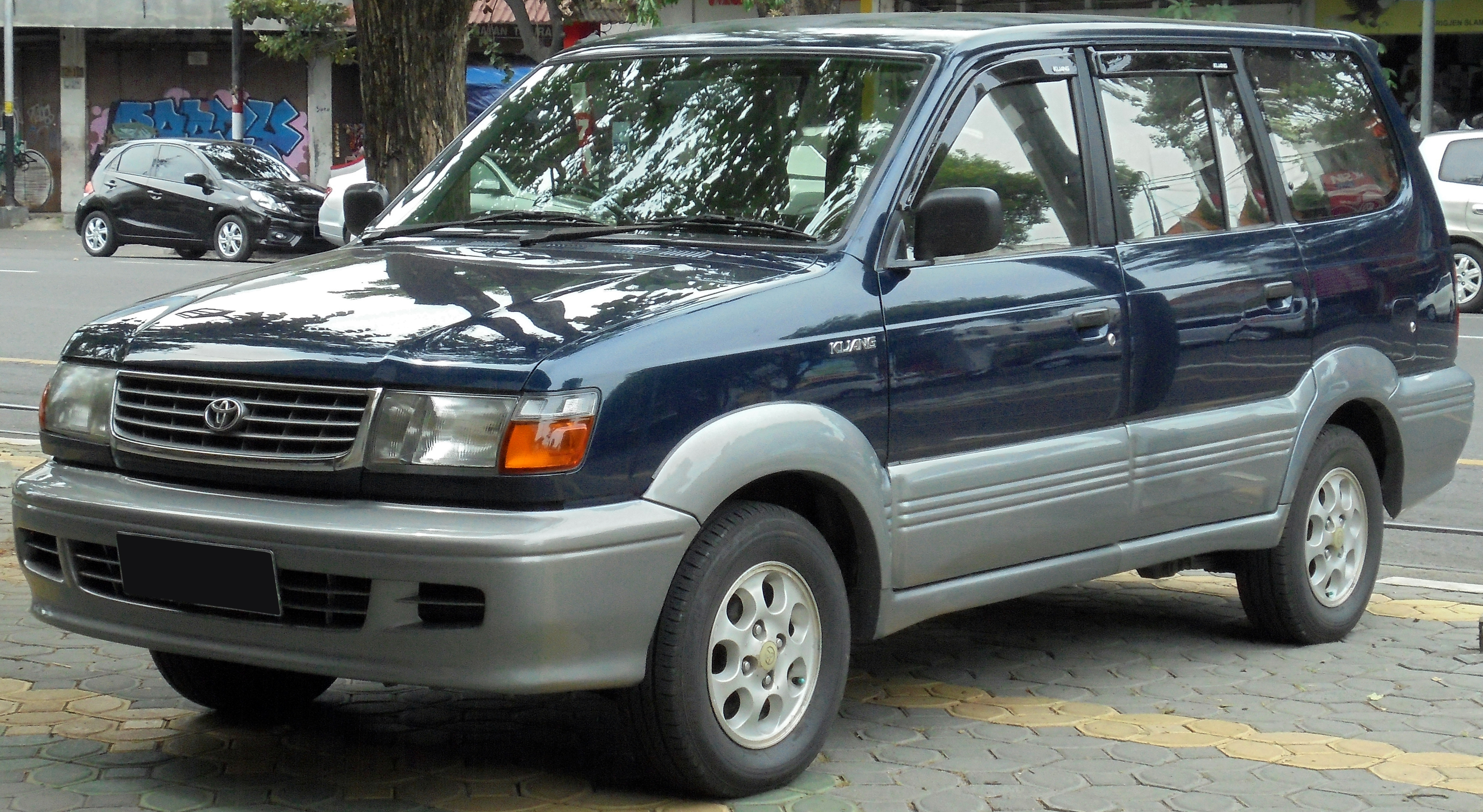
1997–2000 Toyota Kijang Krista 1.8 (KF80, Indonesia)

First facelift

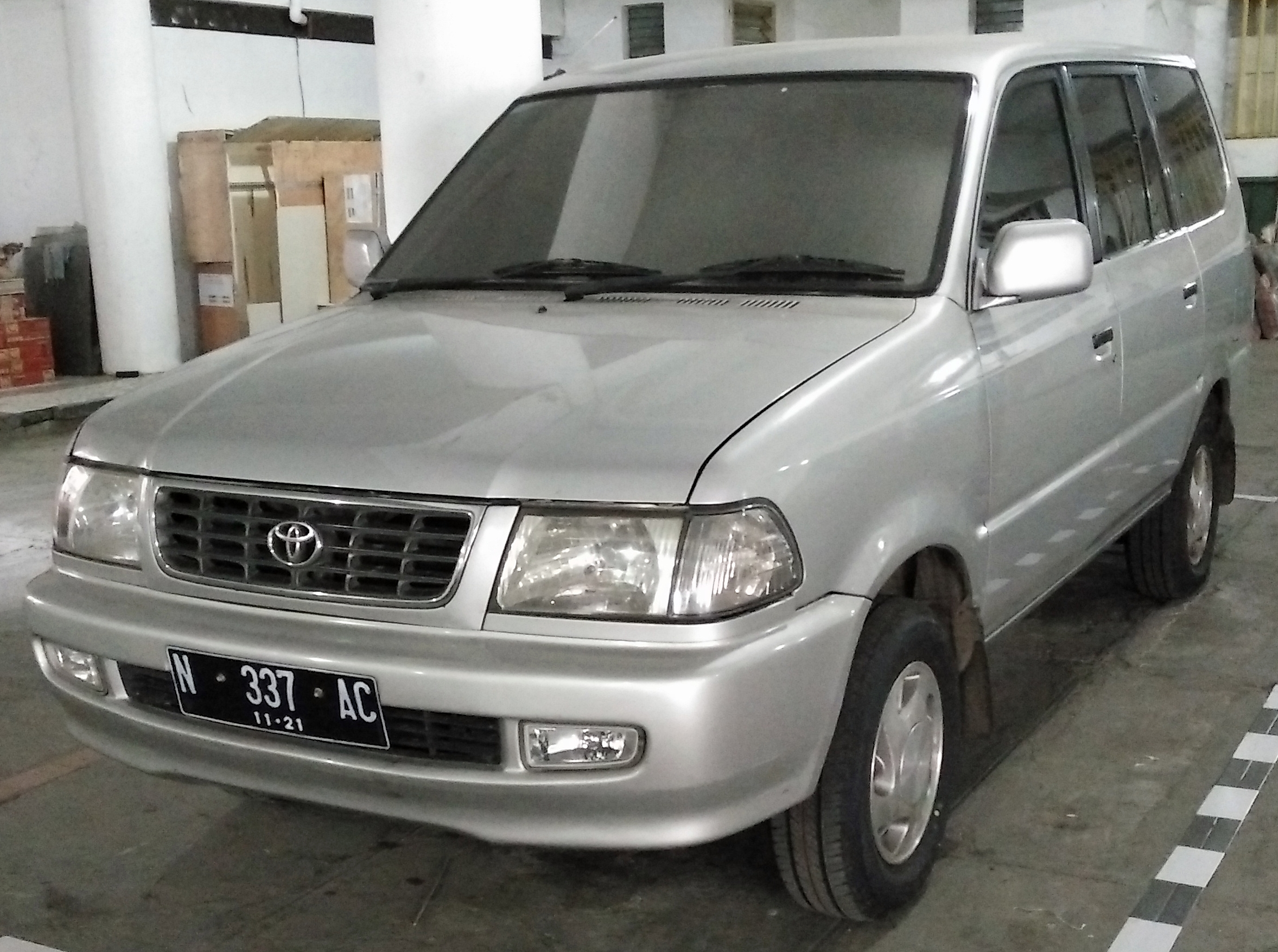
2001 Toyota Kijang LGX 2.4 Diesel (LF82, Indonesia)

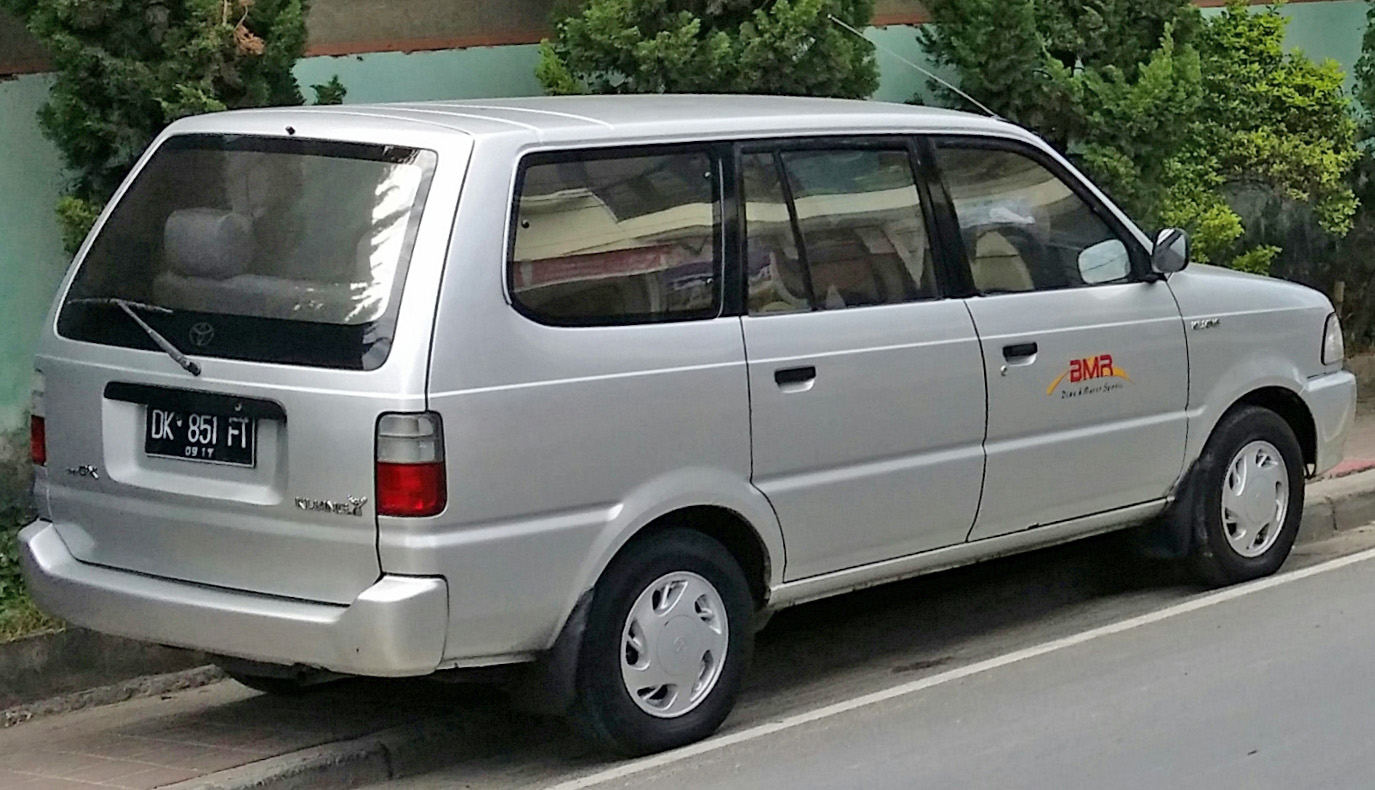
Toyota Kijang LGX (Indonesia)

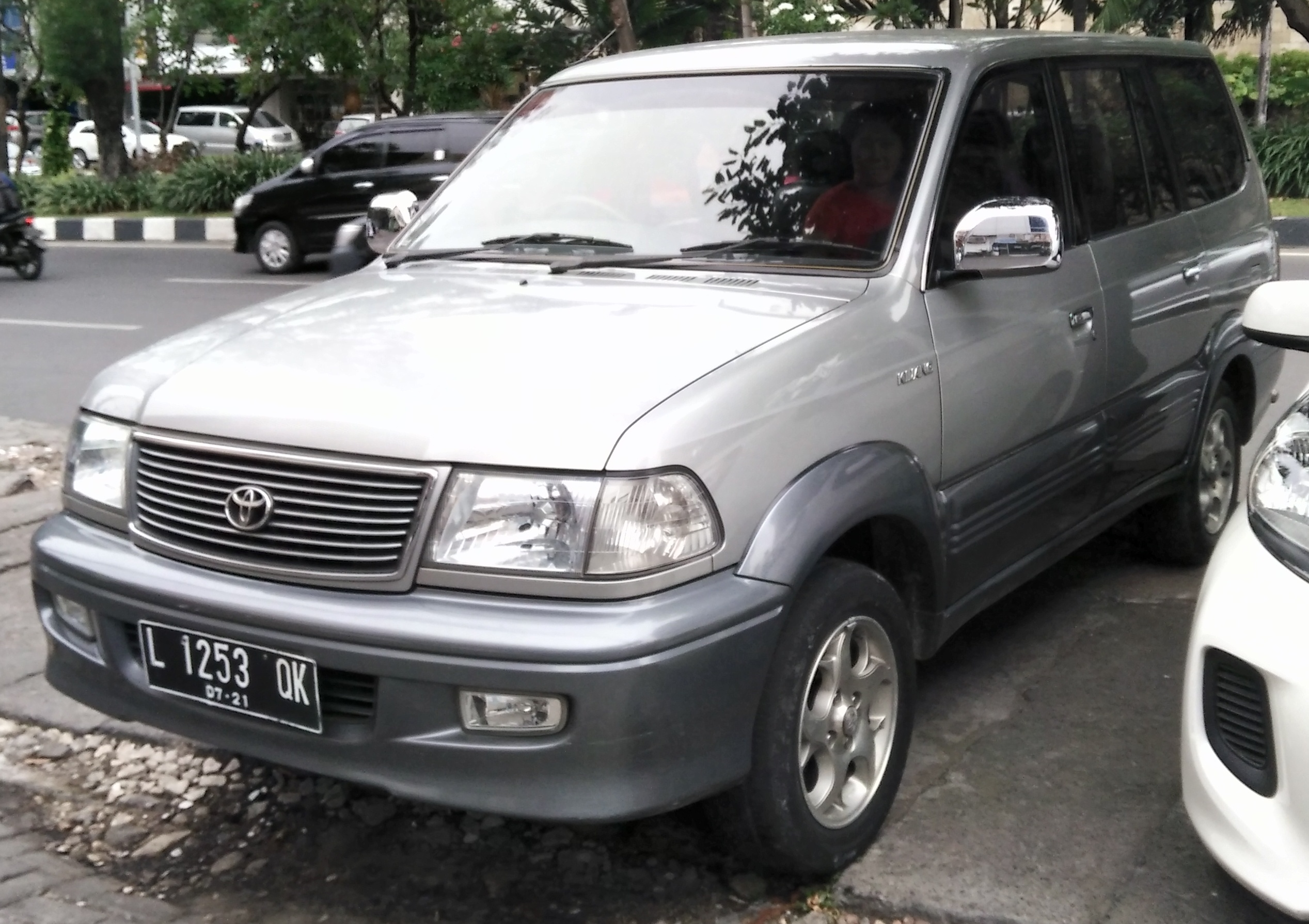
2001 Toyota Kijang Krista (Indonesia)

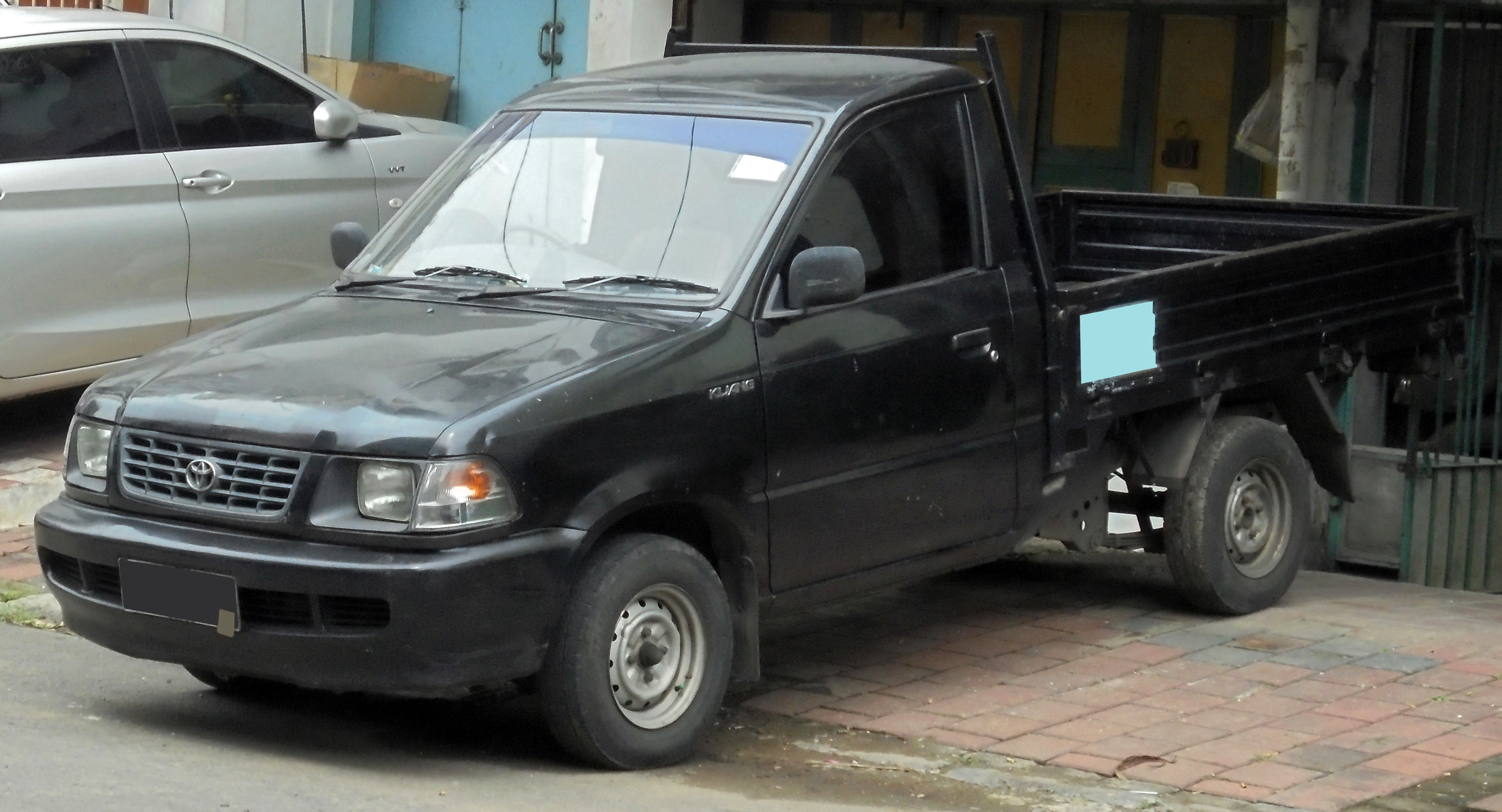
2002 Toyota Kijang Standard Deck pickup (KF60, Indonesia)

Second facelift

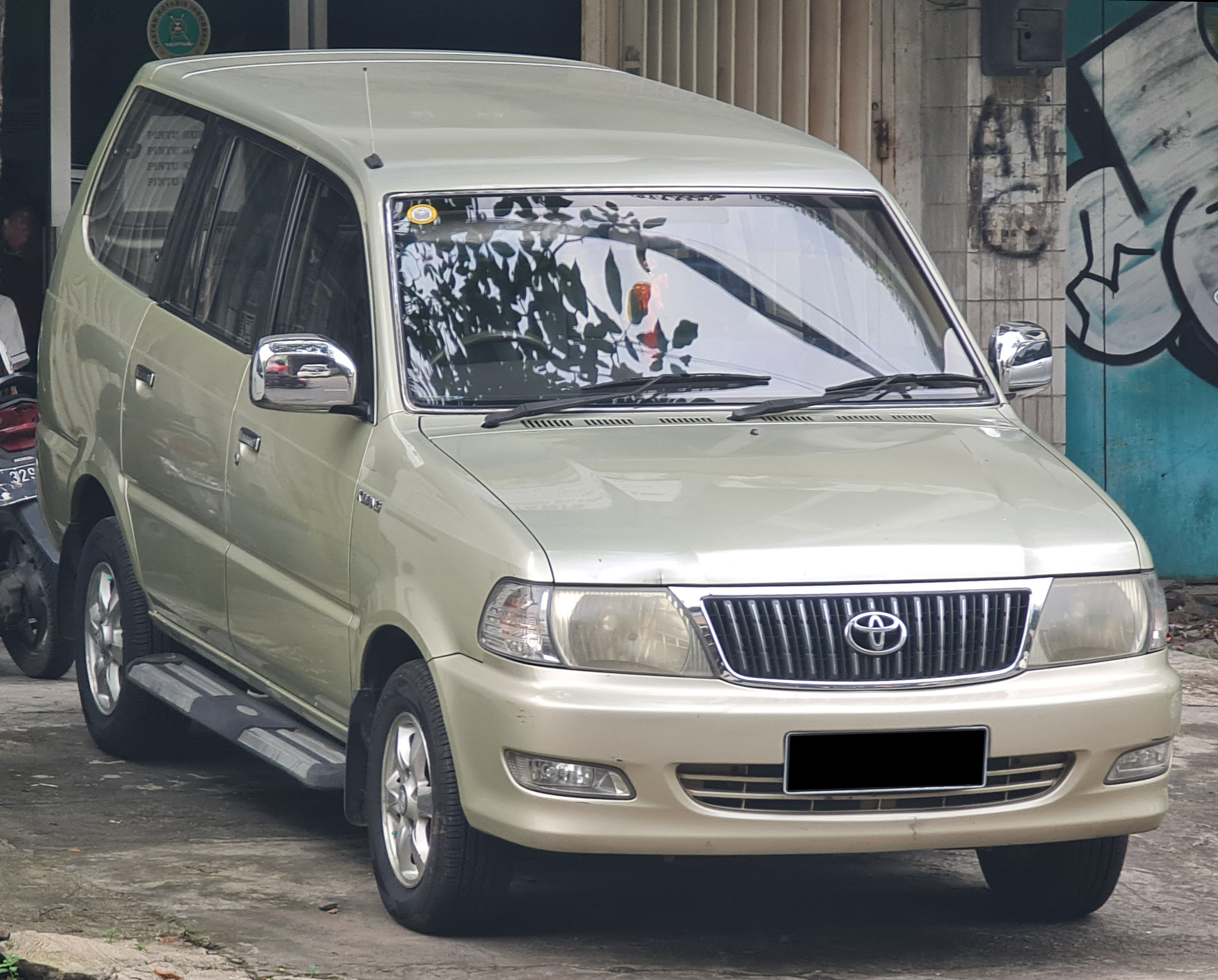
2004 Toyota Kijang LGX 1.8 EFI (KF82, Indonesia)

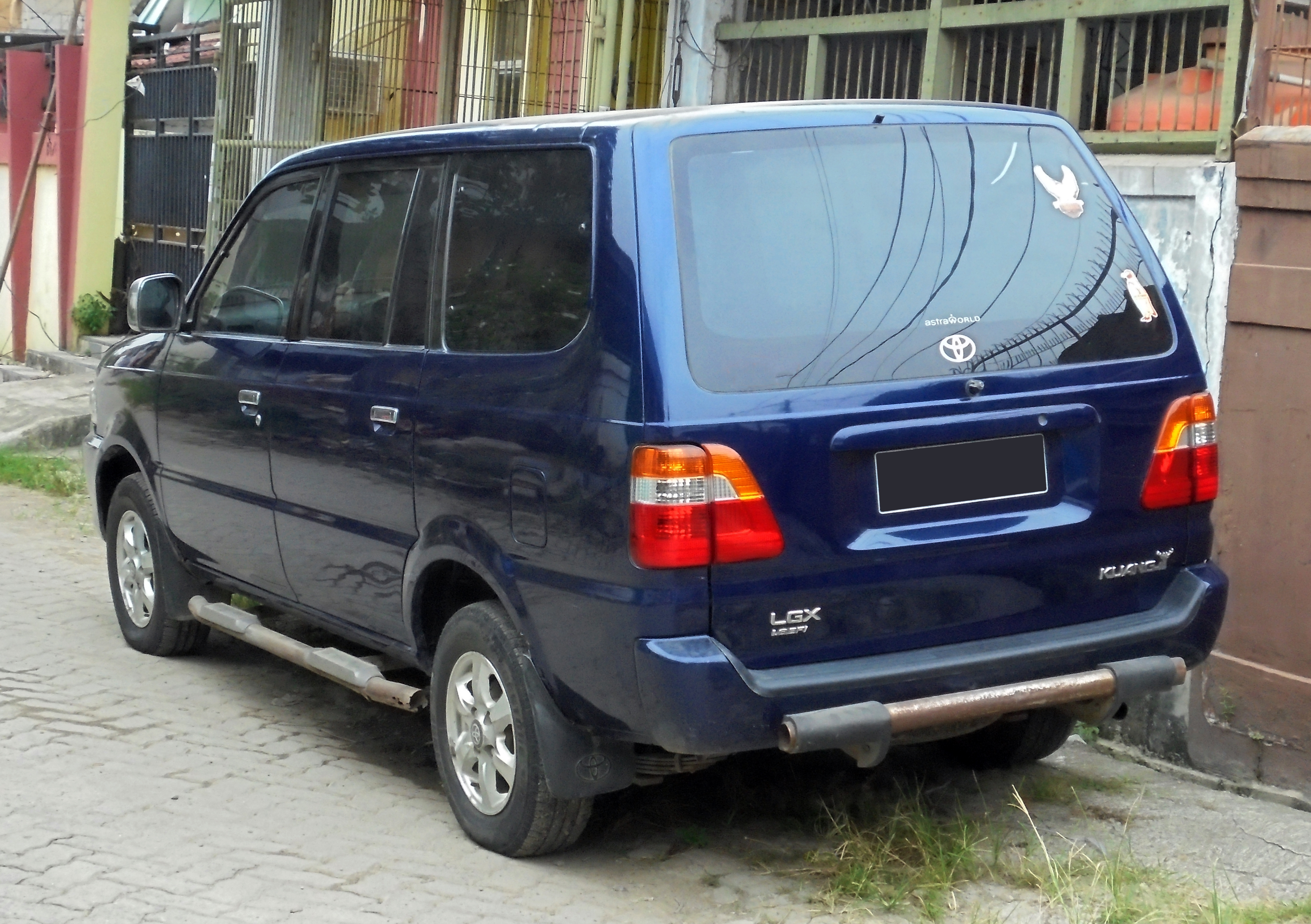
2004 Toyota Kijang LGX 1.8 EFI (KF82, Indonesia)

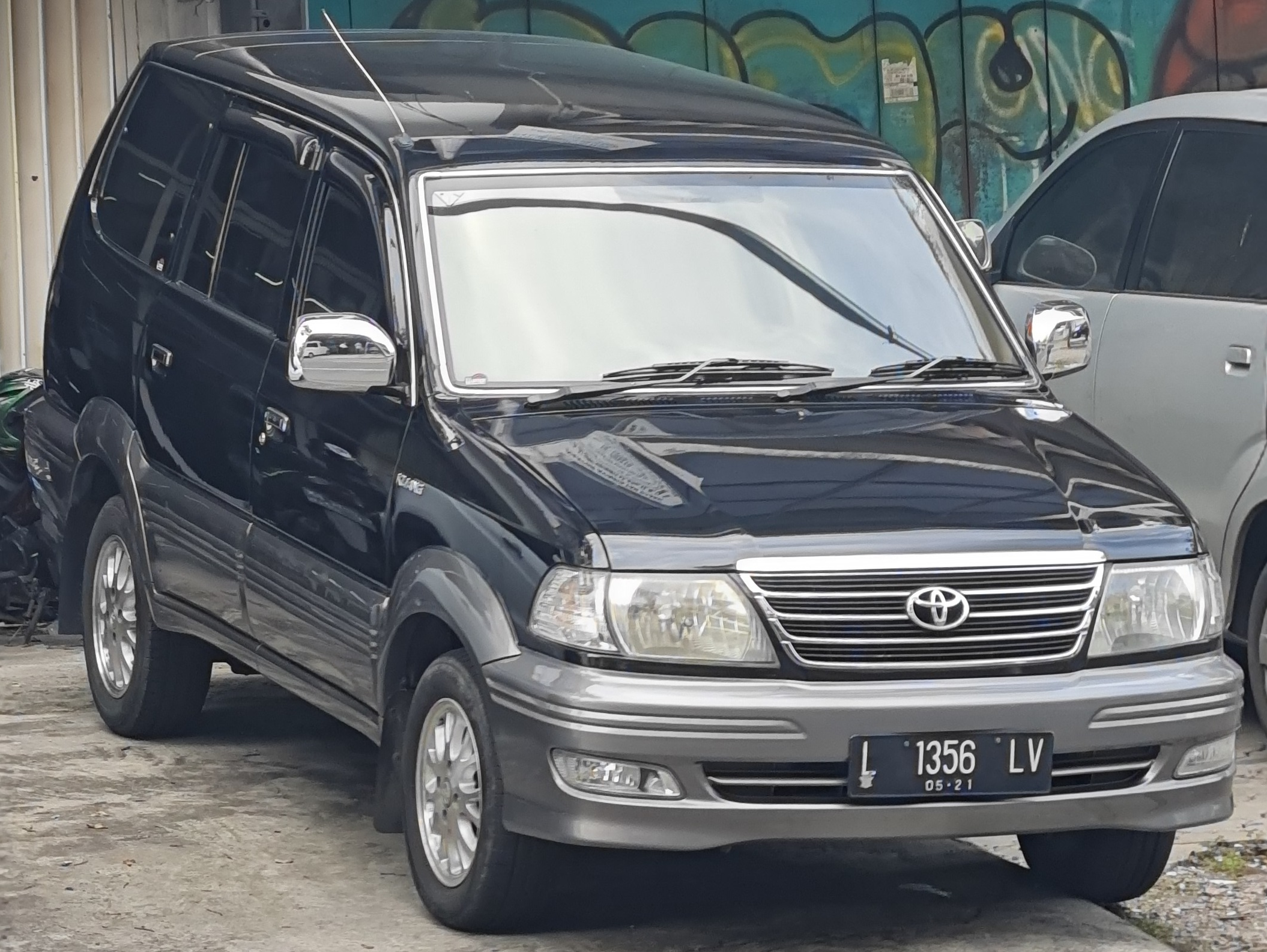
2003 Toyota Kijang Krista 2.4 Diesel (LF82, Indonesia)

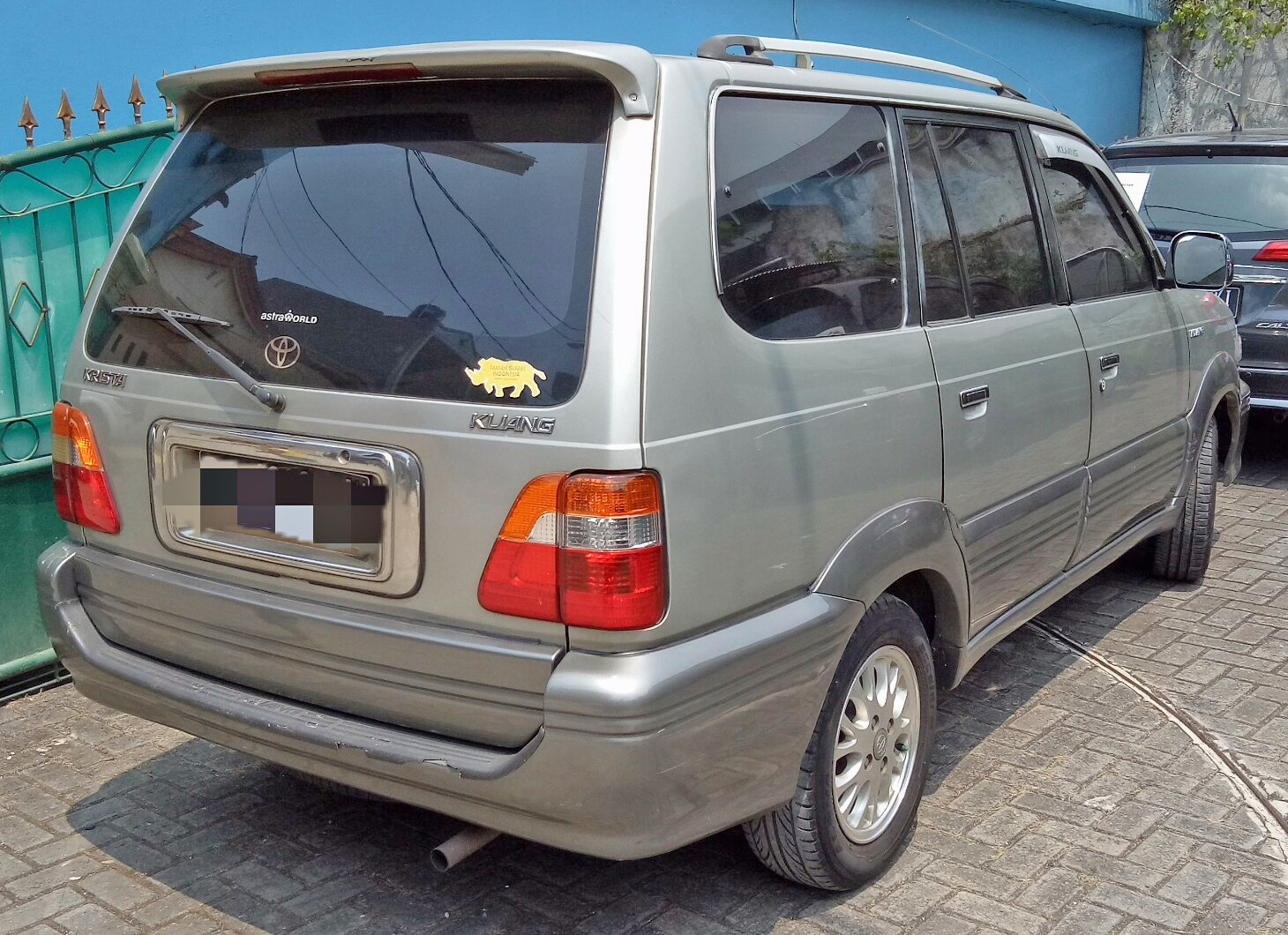
2002–2004 Toyota Kijang Krista 2.0 EFI (RZF81, Indonesia)

=== Unser (F80/F82 - Malaysia) ===
The fourth-generation Kijang was sold in Malaysia as the Unser between mid-1998 to May 2005. The Unser name was derived from the German word unser. It is only offered in an 8 seater configuration with seatbelts for all three rows available as standard. Initially offered with either a 2.4 2L diesel engine or a 1.8 7K-E petrol engine and a 5-speed manual transmission, beginning in July 2000, an automatic variant was available with the 1.8 7K-E engine. In April 2001, a facelift was introduced. Changes included new multi-reflector headlamps, integrated spotlights into the front bumper, clear lenses with coloured bulbs for the tail lights and a new steering wheel design available in either petrol (GLi) or diesel trims (GLD). For 2003, the Unser was updated again and now only available with the 1.8 7K-E engine in two trim levels: GLi and LGX incorporating new exterior design, suede interior trim, 50/50 front facing third row seats (instead of a removable bench in previous models) with the new LGX trim adding power mirrors, chrome trim and body cladding.

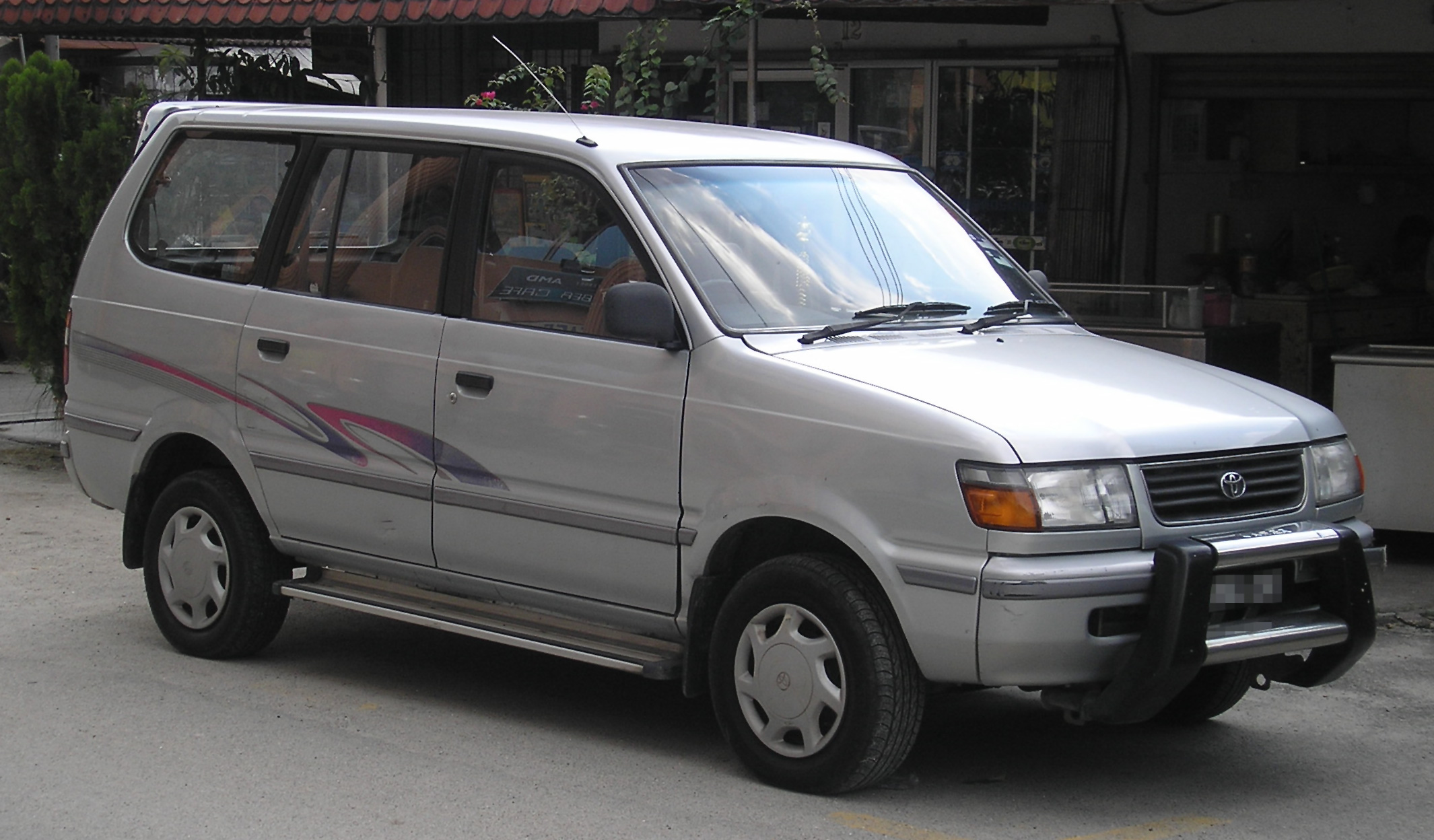
Toyota Unser GLi (pre-facelift, Malaysia)

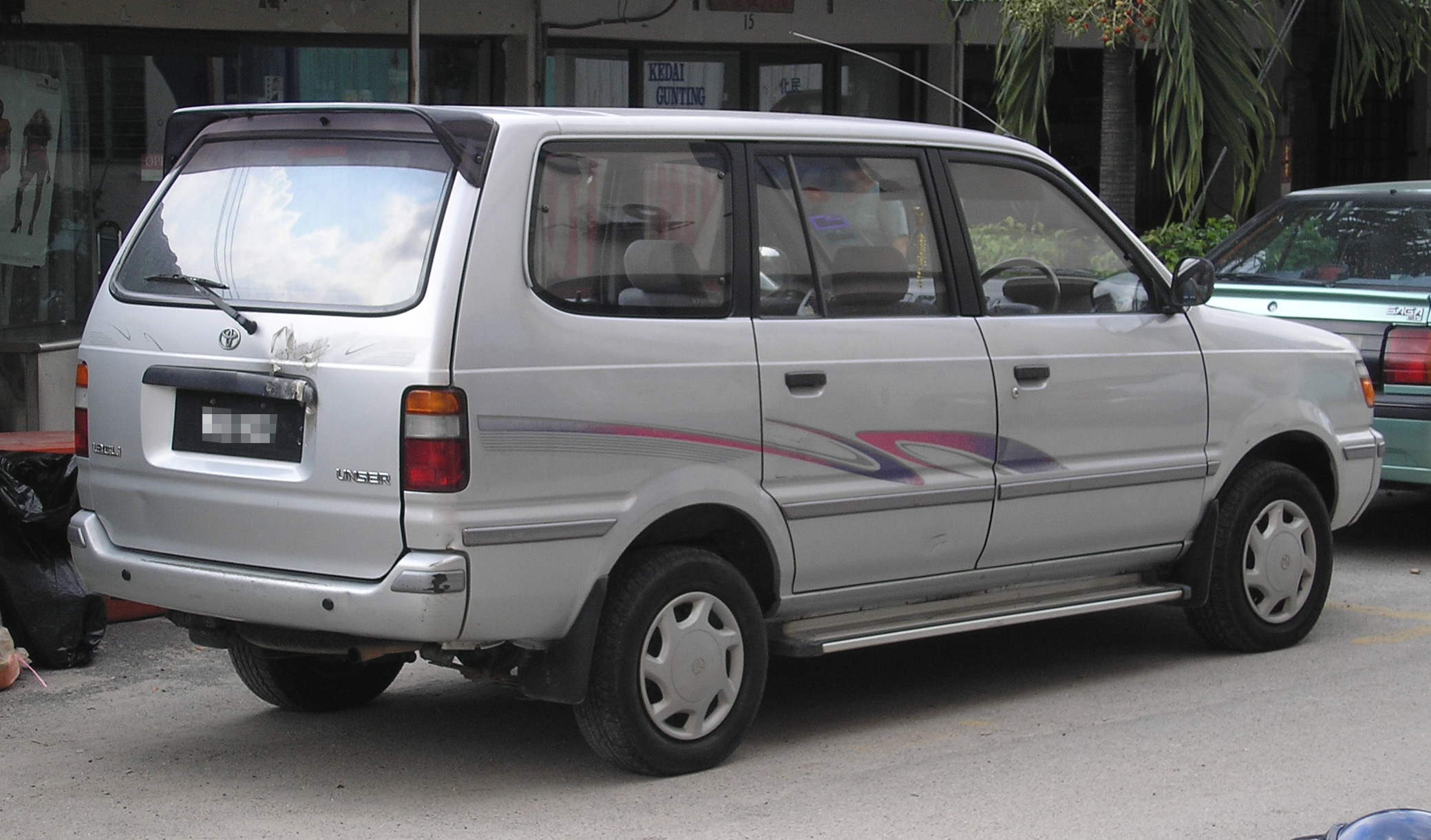
Toyota Unser GLi (pre-facelift, Malaysia)

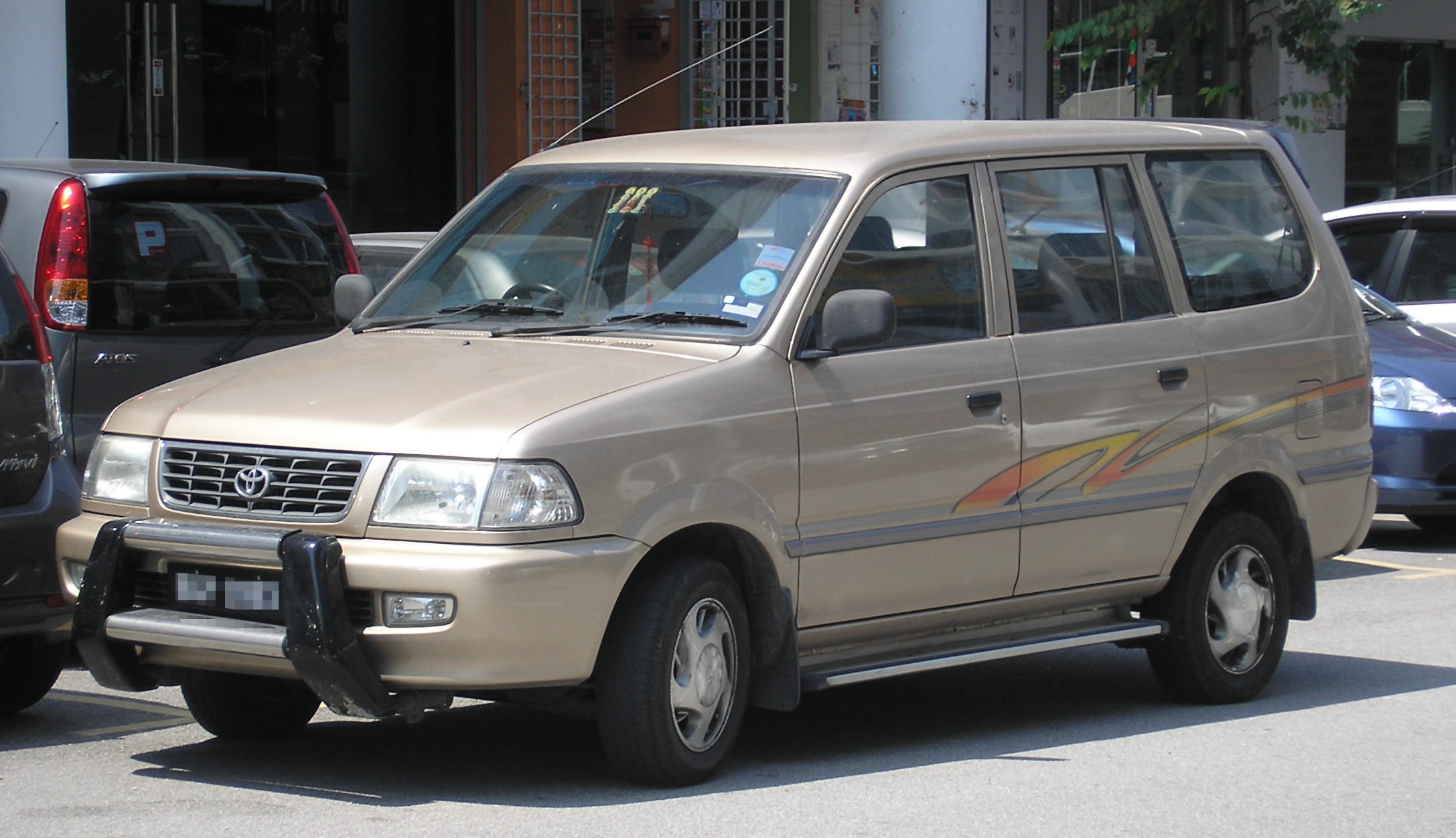
Toyota Unser GLi (first facelift, Malaysia)

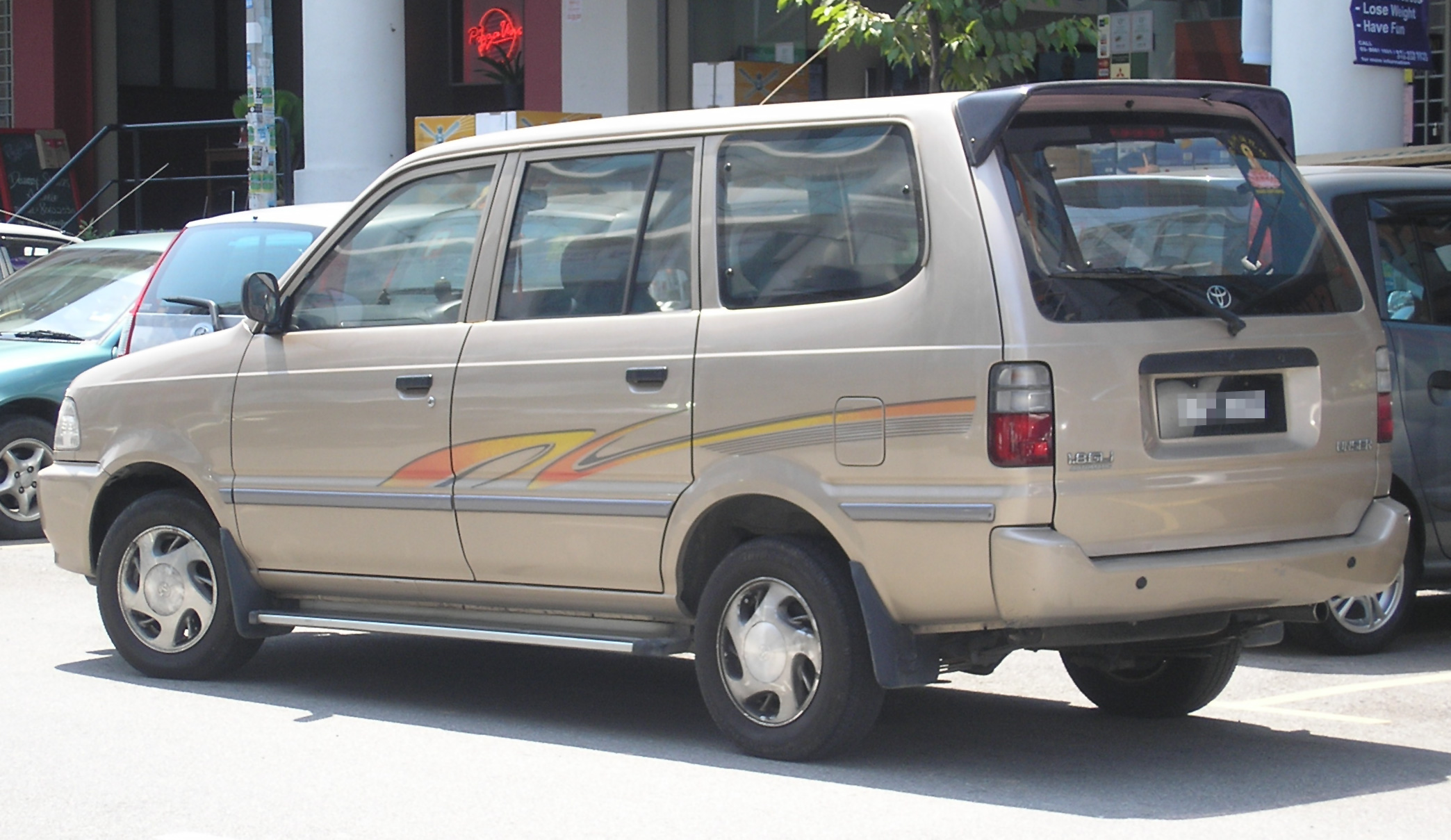
Toyota Unser GLi (first facelift, Malaysia)

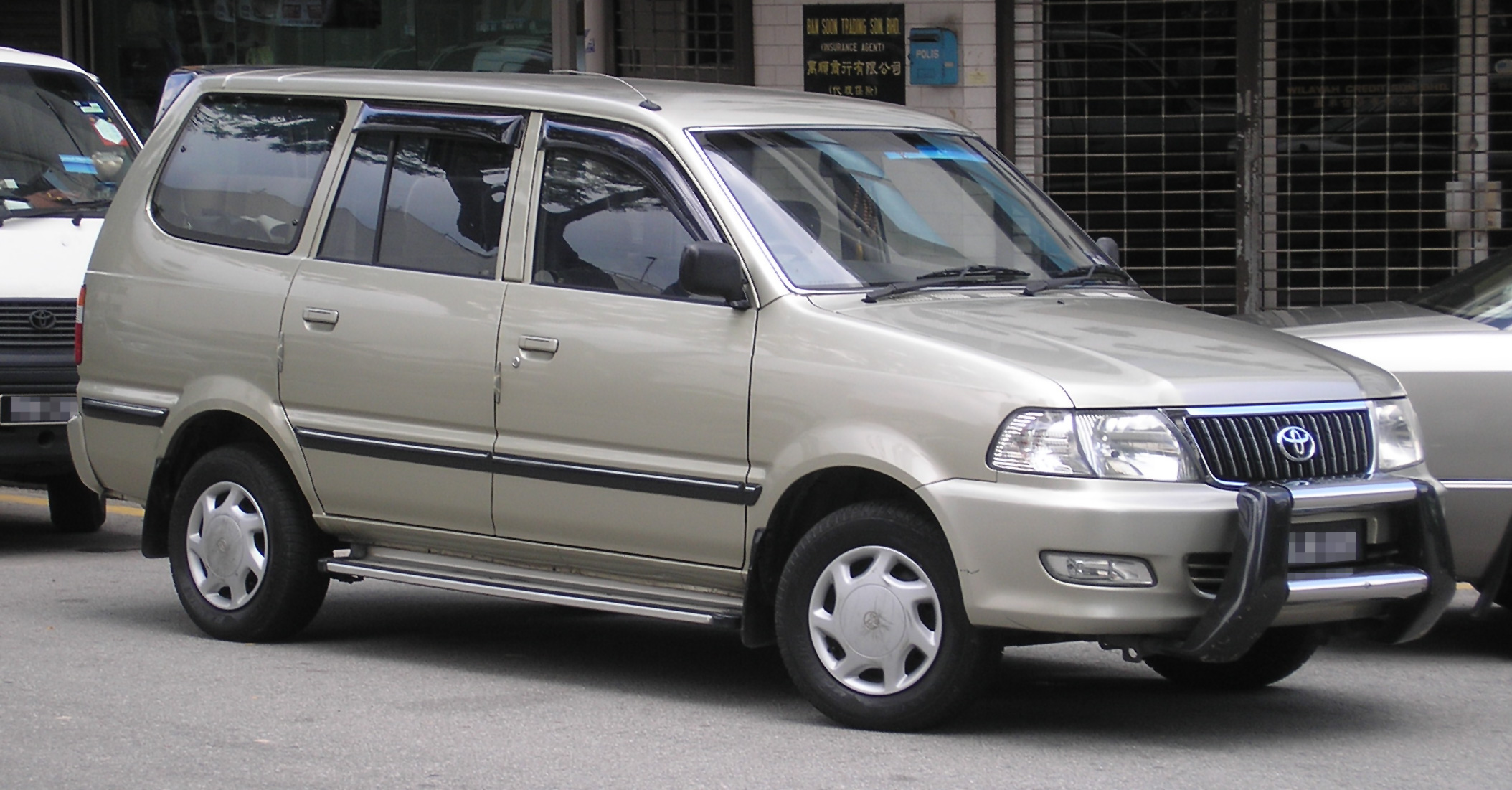
Toyota Unser GLi (second facelift, Malaysia)

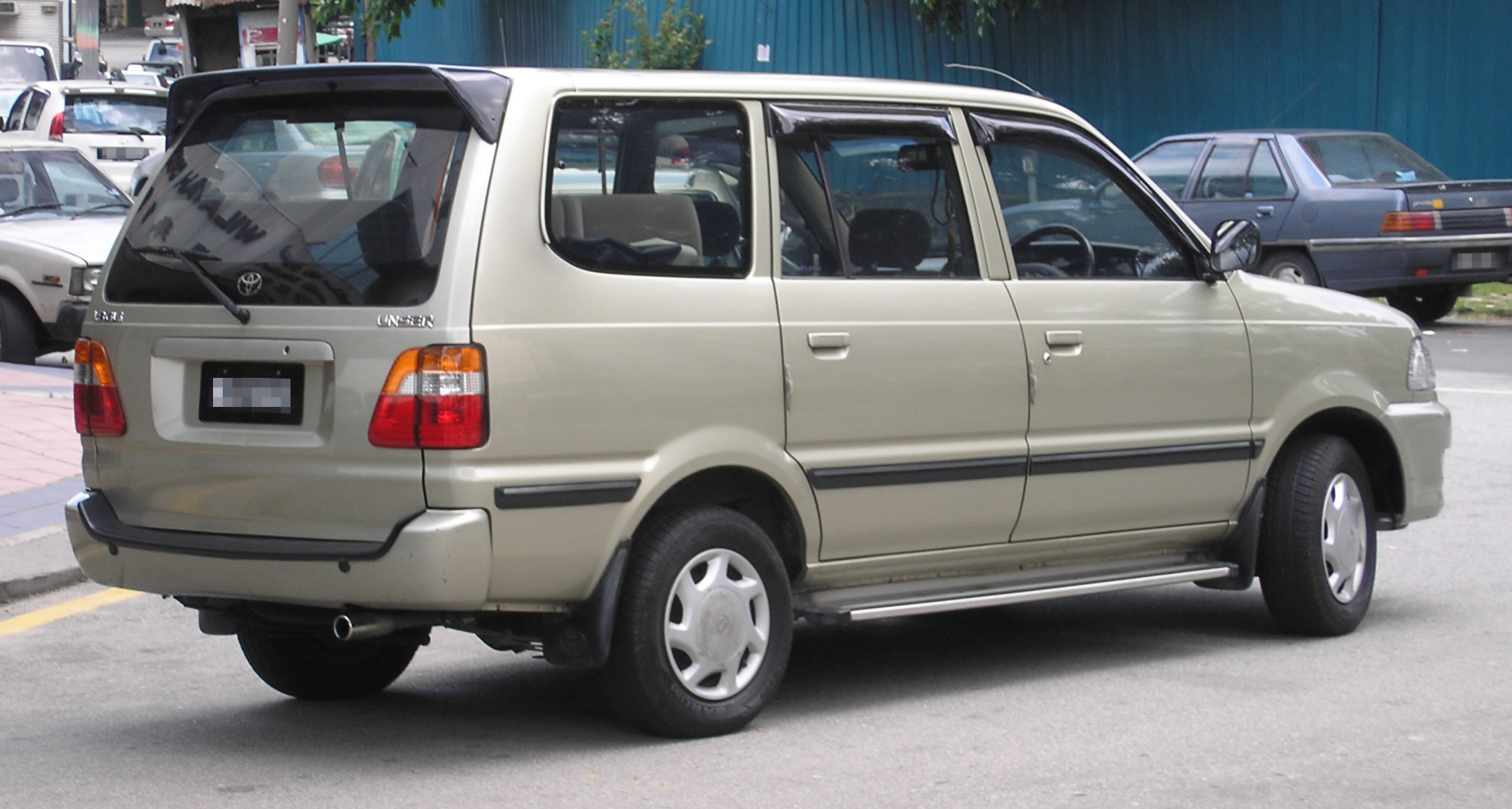
Toyota Unser GLi (second facelift, Malaysia)

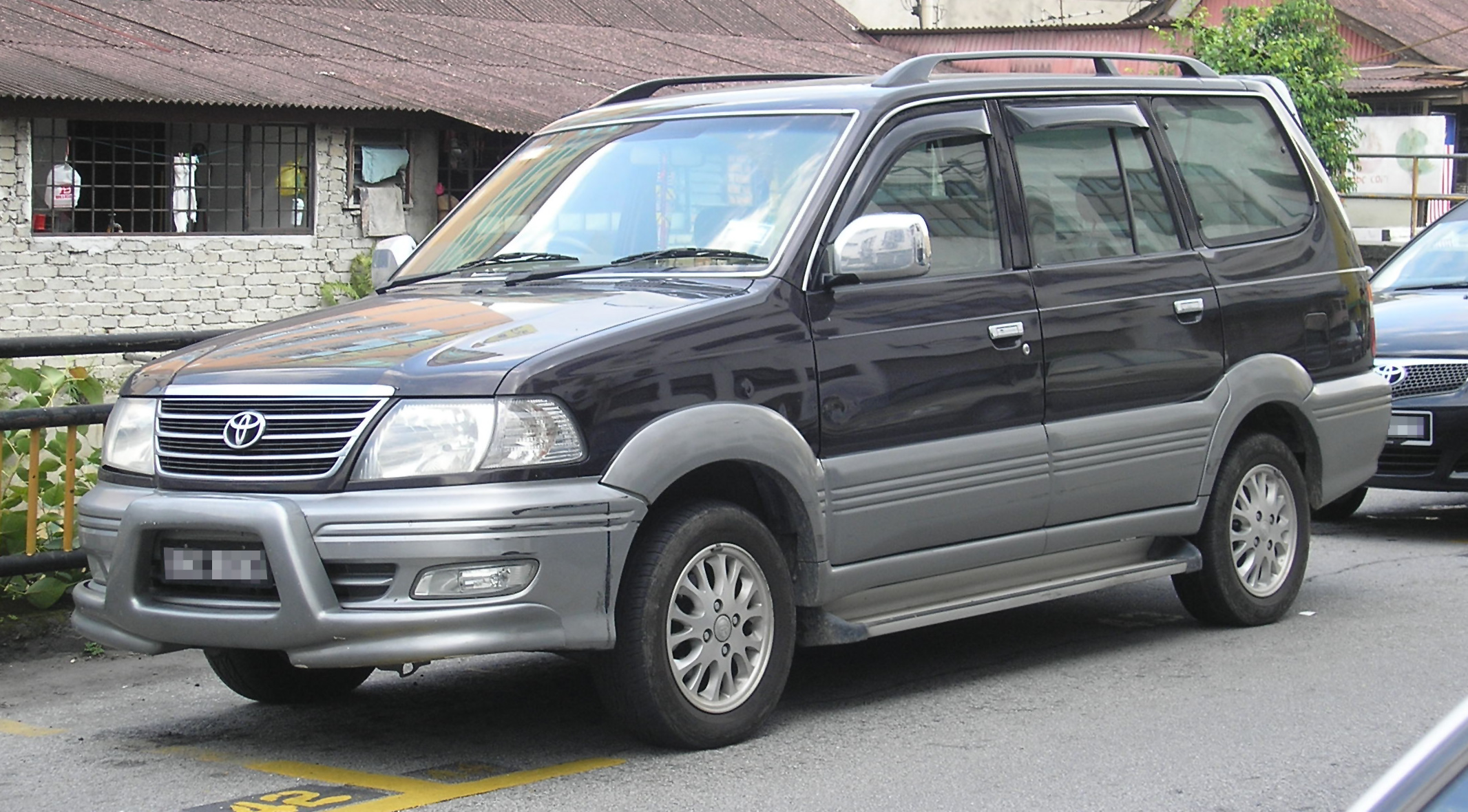
Toyota Unser LGX (second facelift, Malaysia)

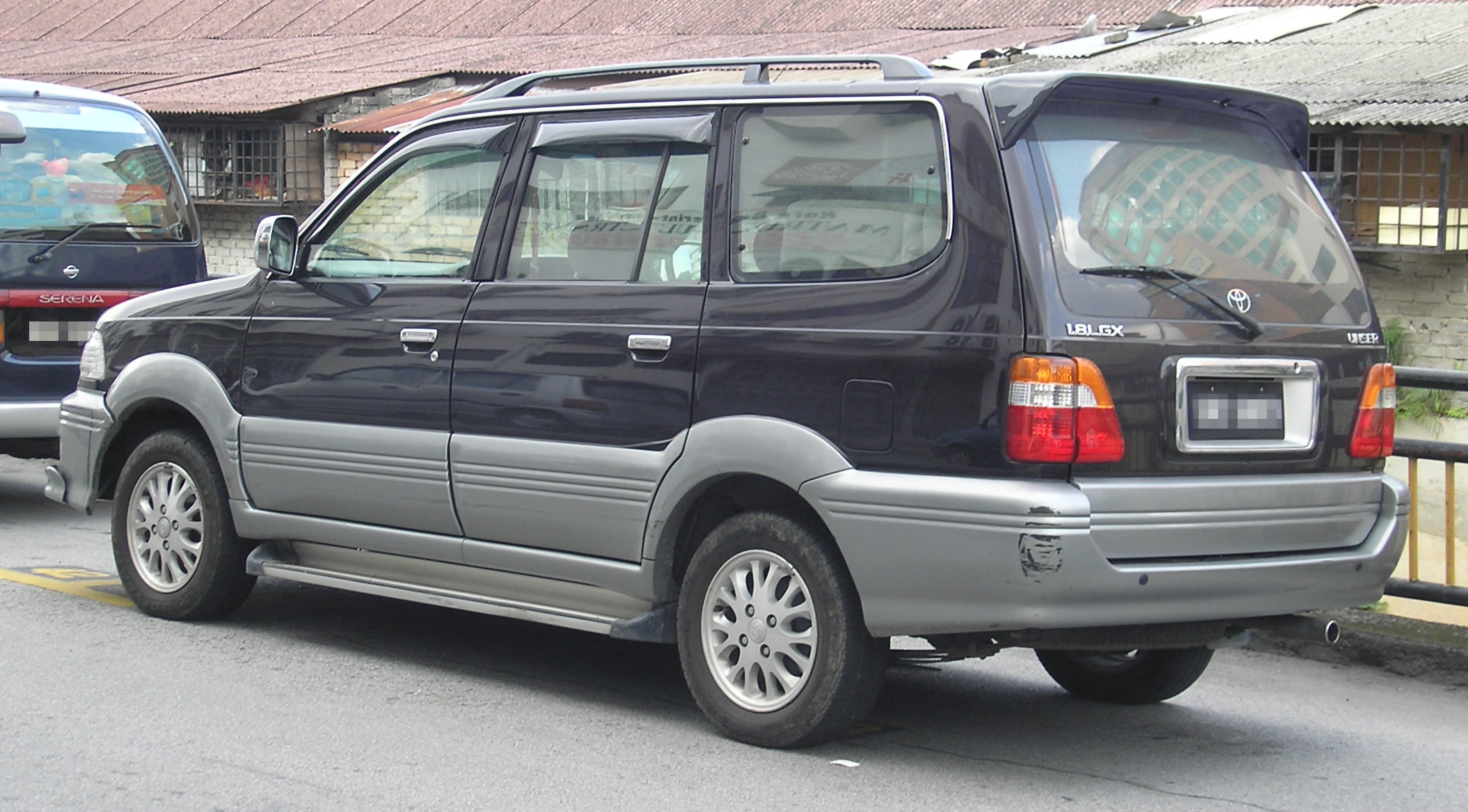
Toyota Unser LGX (second facelift, Malaysia)

=== Revo (F80/F81/F82 - Philippines) ===
1998–2000 (F80)

The fourth-generation Kijang was sold in the Philippines under the Tamaraw FX Revo nameplate. The model was introduced in 1998 to replace the Tamaraw FX (though it was sold alongside it for a while). The platform and diesel engine were based from the similar era Hilux. Engine choices include a 1.8-litre EFI for the petrol engine and 2.4-litre diesel engine. Trim levels available are the DLX (entry level), GL, GLX, SR (Sport Runner), the high-end LXV, VX200 and the limited edition SR-J and VX200-J (part of Toyota's series of J, or Japan-spec, vehicles, which extended to the Hilux, the HiAce, and the RAV4). The LXV trim was discontinued in the 2000 model year in favor of the VX200, while the GSX is a whole new variant. Facelifted versions were introduced in 2002; two J-spec trim lines (SR-J and VX200-J) were retired from the line, and higher-end trim versions received upgraded leather seating, entertainment systems and appointments.

The DLX has a vinyl interior, a two spoke steering wheel, a two-speaker radio/tape set-up and steel wheels with center ornaments. The GL trim has steel wheels with hubcaps, a four speaker radio/tape set-up and a fabric interior. The GLX, SR and LXV has a six speaker radio/tape set-up, fog lamps, alloy wheels, a rear wiper and all power amenities. Body graphics are exclusive to the SR and LXV only. The LXV had gold-trimmed badges. The SR has the word "Sport Runner" written in a font set similar to the one used for the Supra. It sold very well, in 1998 it accumulated a total sales of 7,700 units. Safety features were basic such as safety belts, load sensing proportioning valve, child-proof door locks and door impact beams.

The first released diesel powered Revo was notorious for being a smoke belcher, even among other diesels at that time, with some complaints from owners.

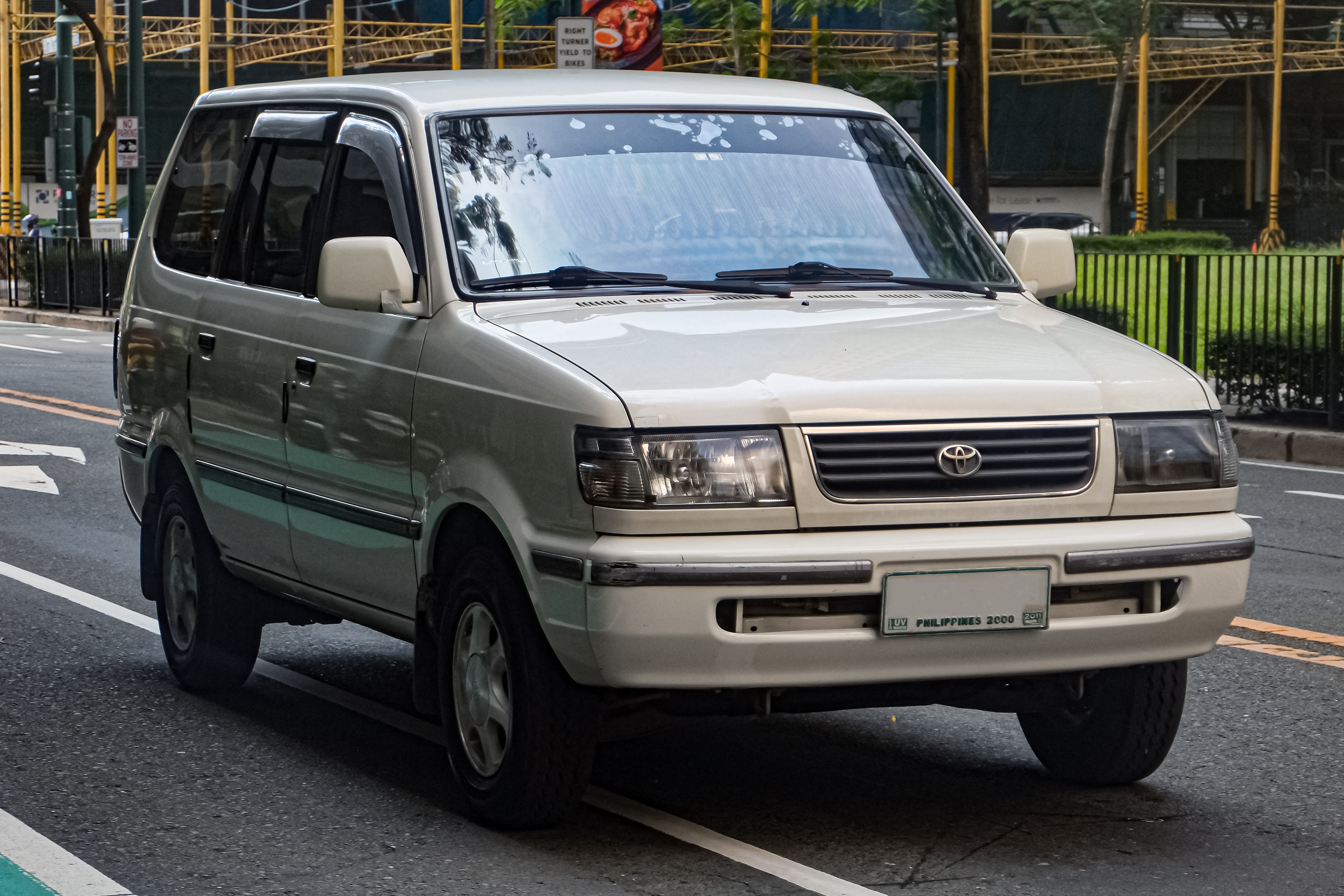
1998 Toyota Revo 1.8 GLX (KF80, Philippines)

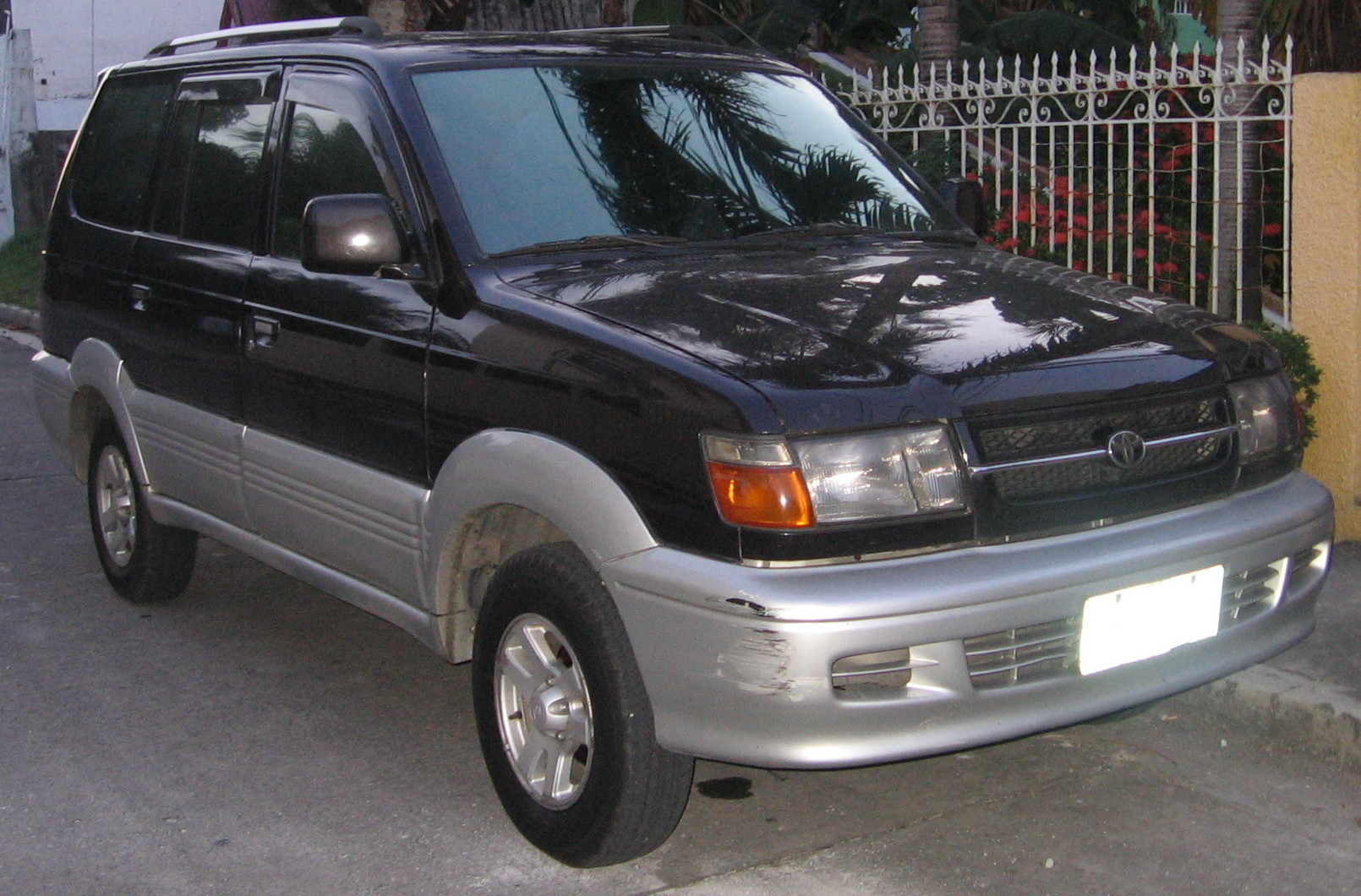
1999 Toyota Revo 1.8 SR (KF80, Philippines)

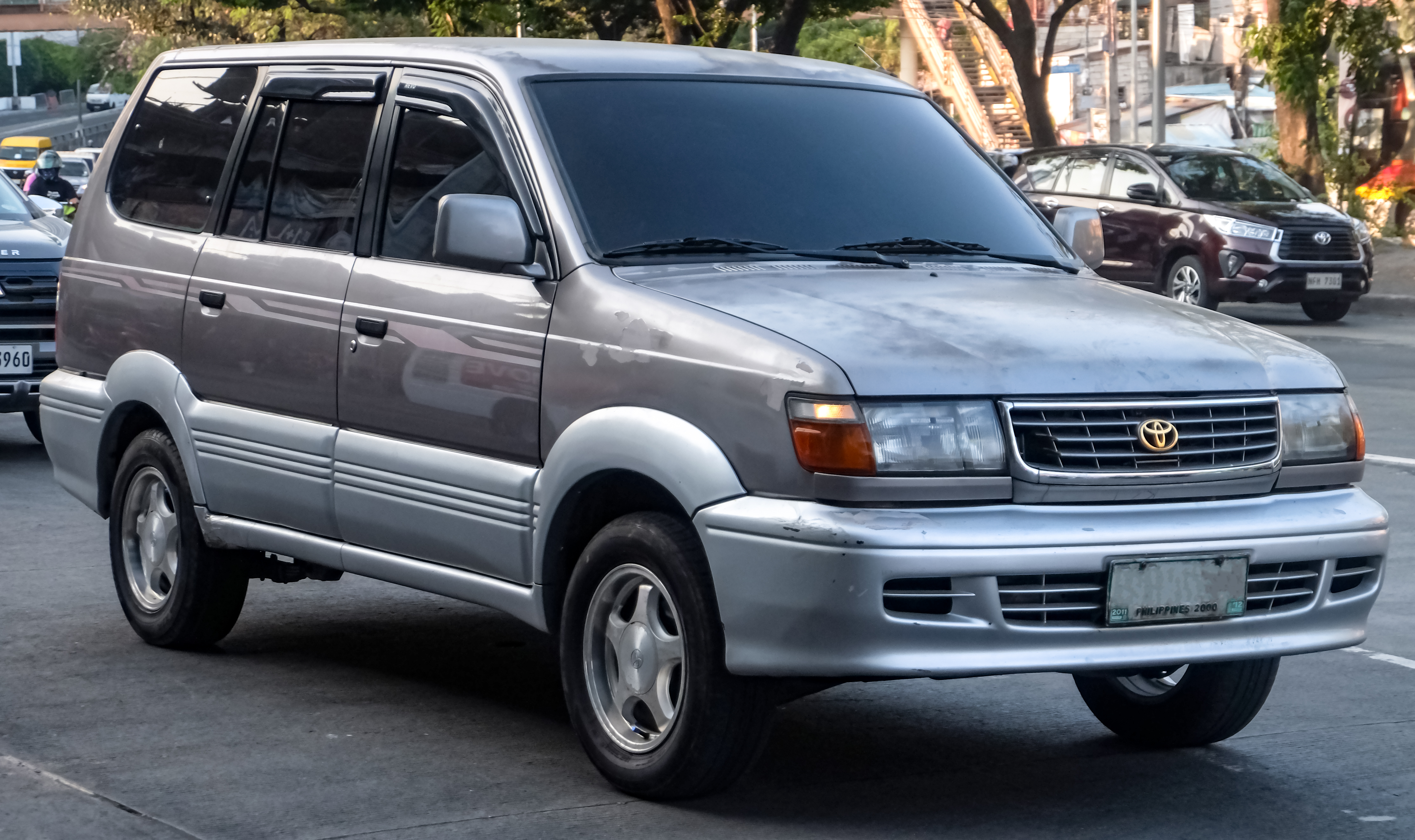
2000 Toyota Revo 1.8 LXV (KF80, Philippines)

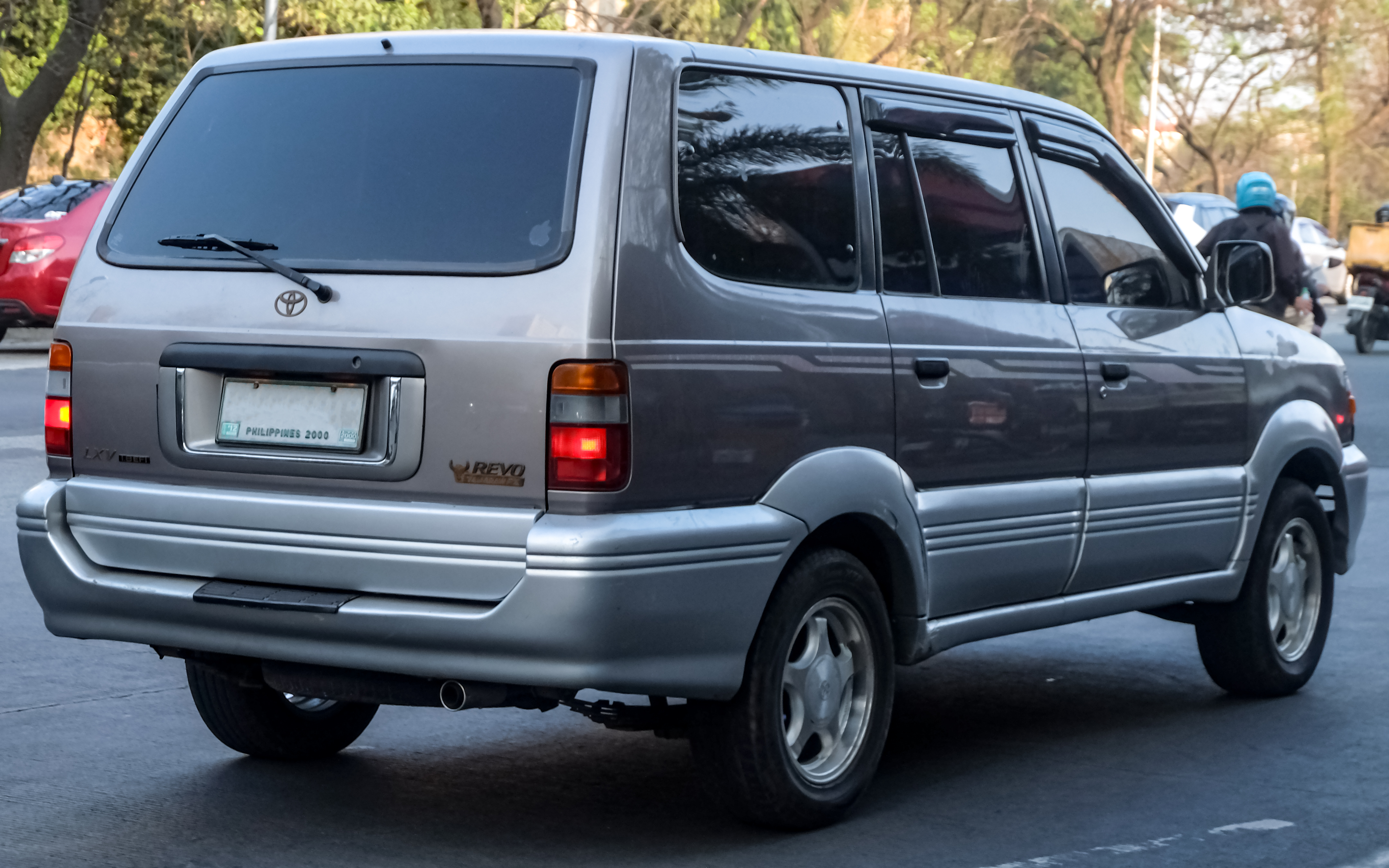
2000 Toyota Revo 1.8 LXV (KF80, Philippines)

2000–2002 (F80/F81)

For 2000, Toyota revised the Revo, with badge changes and trim line revamp. Engine choices include the newly introduced 2.0-litre SOHC EFI and 1.8-litre EFI petrol engines as well as a 2.4-litre OHC direct-injection diesel engine. The 2.4-litre diesel engine has been revised to address smoke-belching complaints.

The Revo received a facelift, featuring clear halogen headlamps, new wheels, new interiors and availability of new colours. Trim levels include the DLX (entry level), GL, GSX, GLX, SR (Sport Runner), VX200 and the limited edition SR-J and VX200-J (part of Toyota's series of J, or Japan-spec, vehicles, which extended to the Hilux and the RAV4). The VX line eventually replaced the LXV; and the GSX is a whole new variant.

The DLX, the entry level, has only power steering, and no other power features. This variant lacks a tachometer, and is equipped only with a tape deck/radio receiver, 2 speakers in the front row only, vinyl interior and it has 14-inch steel wheels with center ornament. The GL is the "higher-end entry level" with radio-CD setup, fabric interior, tachometer, and steel wheels with hubcaps. The remaining lines has all-power features, CD player/radio receiver and six-speaker setup (but upgradable to a DVD player setup), as well as rear-window defoggers. The VX and SR-J lines have leather seats and TV screens mounted on the dashboard and on the headrests. Only the SR-J, a special version of the SR (distinct wheels, unique livery), the GSX and the VX200 and VX200J had 2.0-litre petrol engines and automatic power wing-mounted radio antennas. Front-facing third-row seats were made as an option albeit without three-point seatbelts, a rarity for the vehicle type at that time in the Philippines.

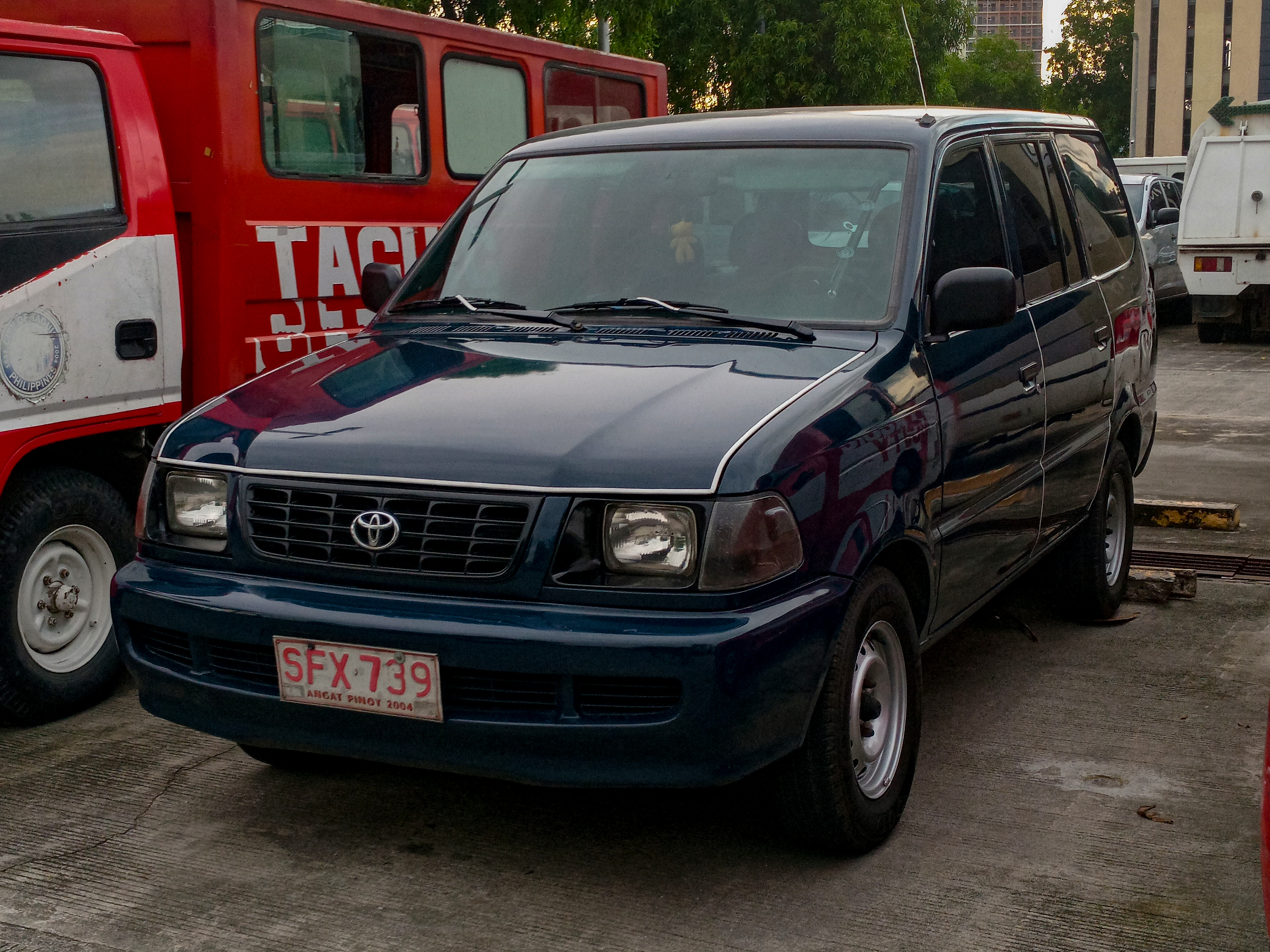
2001 Toyota Revo 1.8 DLX (KF80, Philippines)

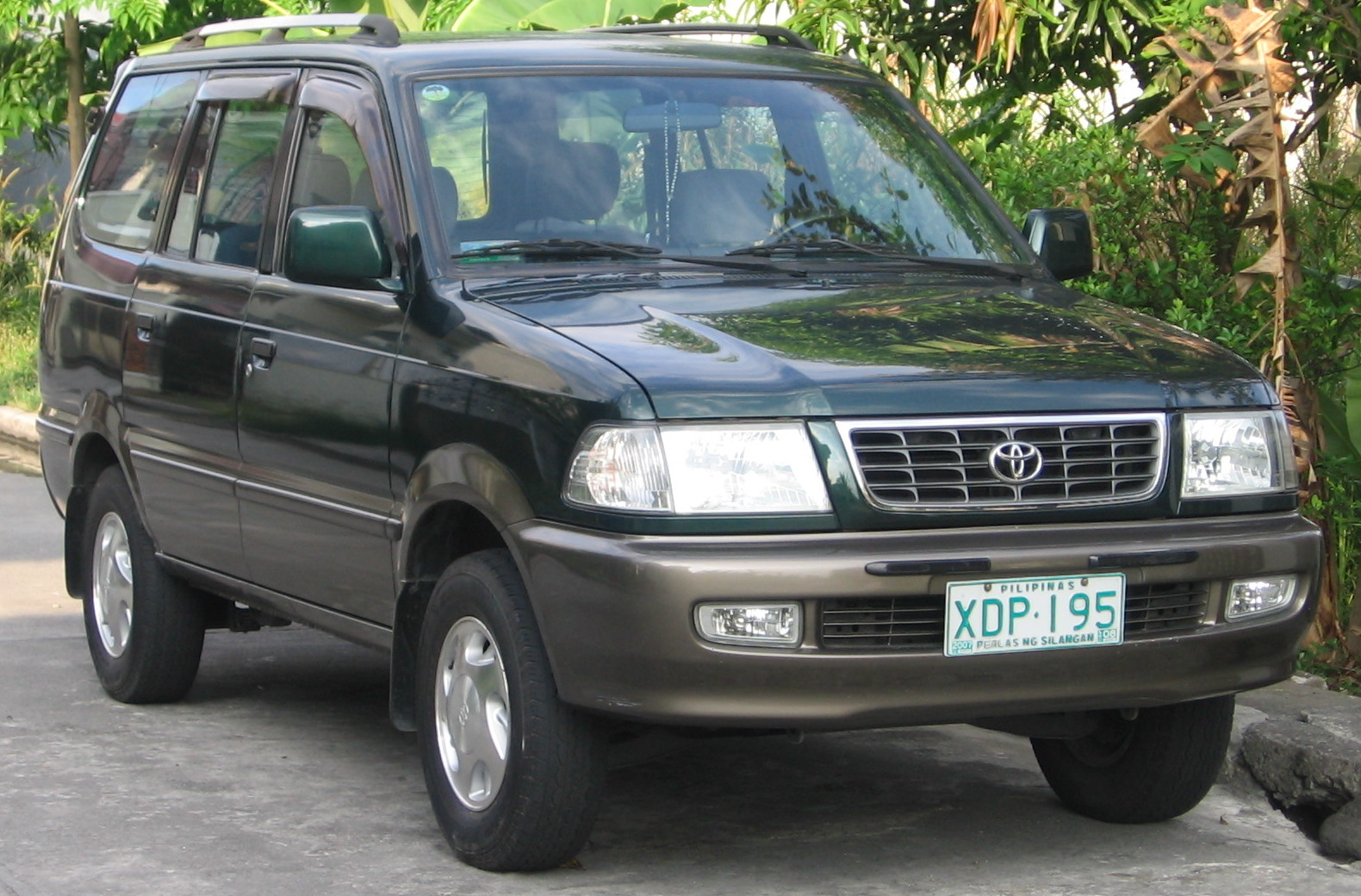
2002 Toyota Revo 1.8 GLX (KF80, Philippines)

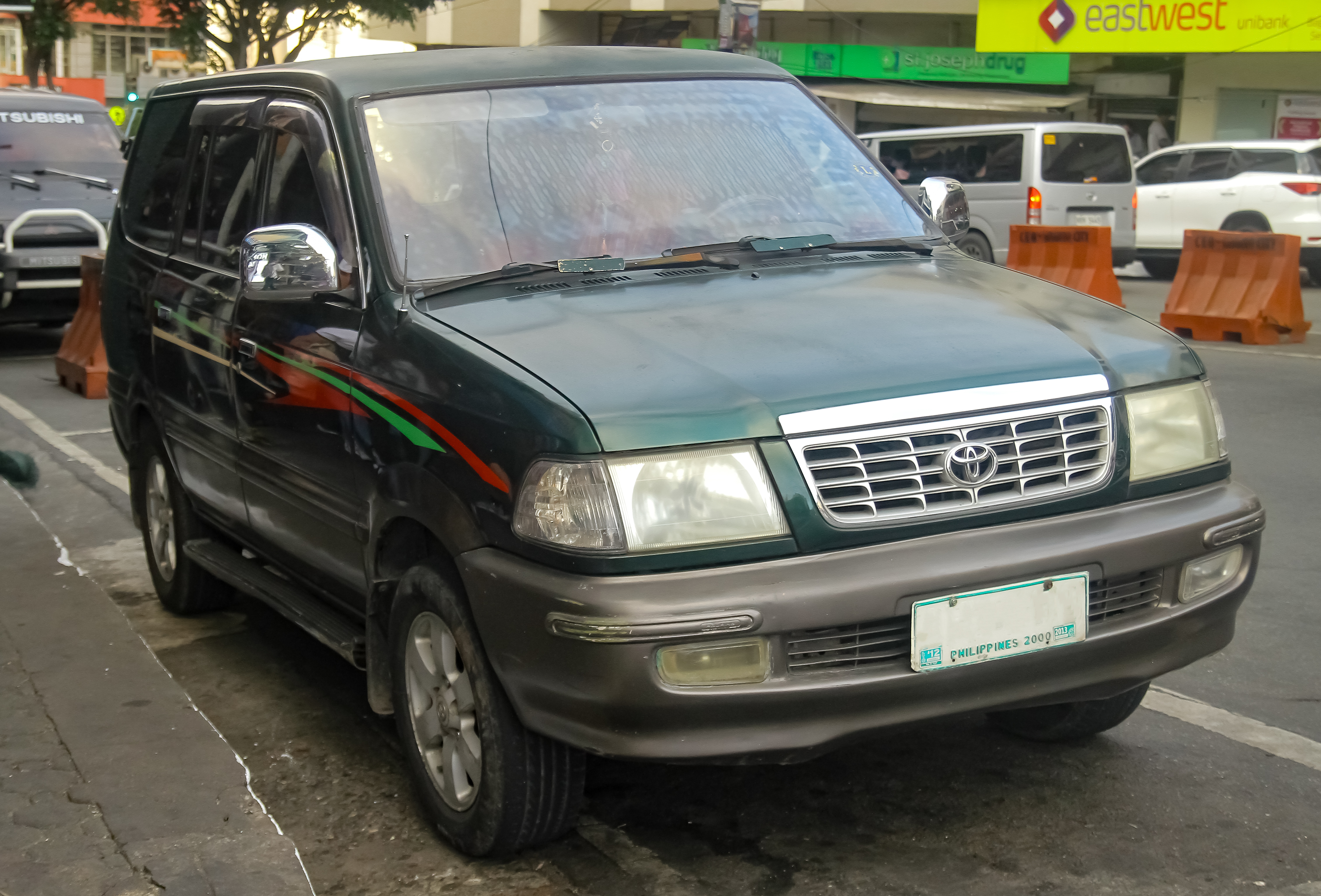
2000 Toyota Revo 2.0 GSX (RZF81, Philippines)

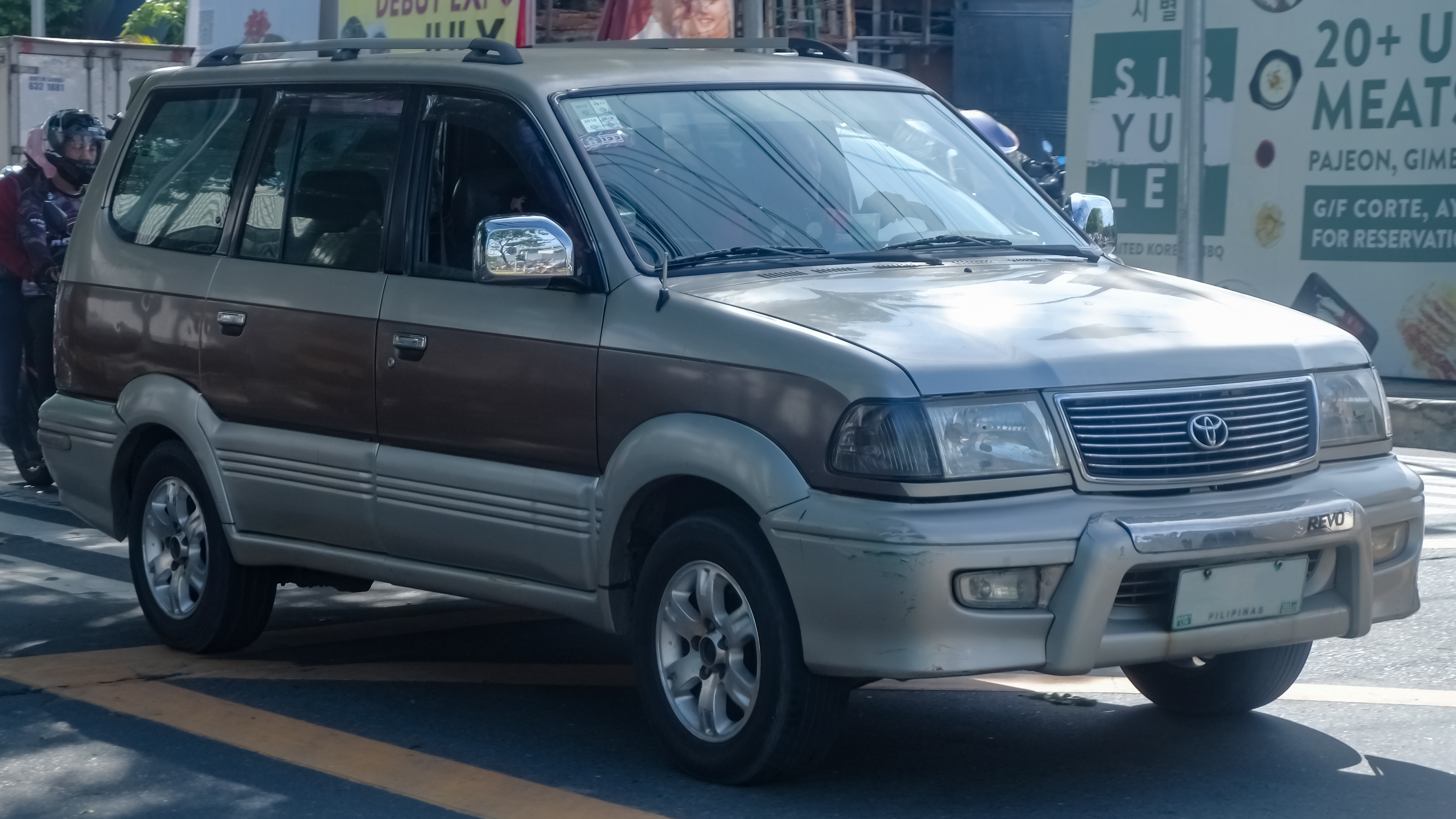
2002 Toyota Revo VX200-J (RZF81, Philippines)

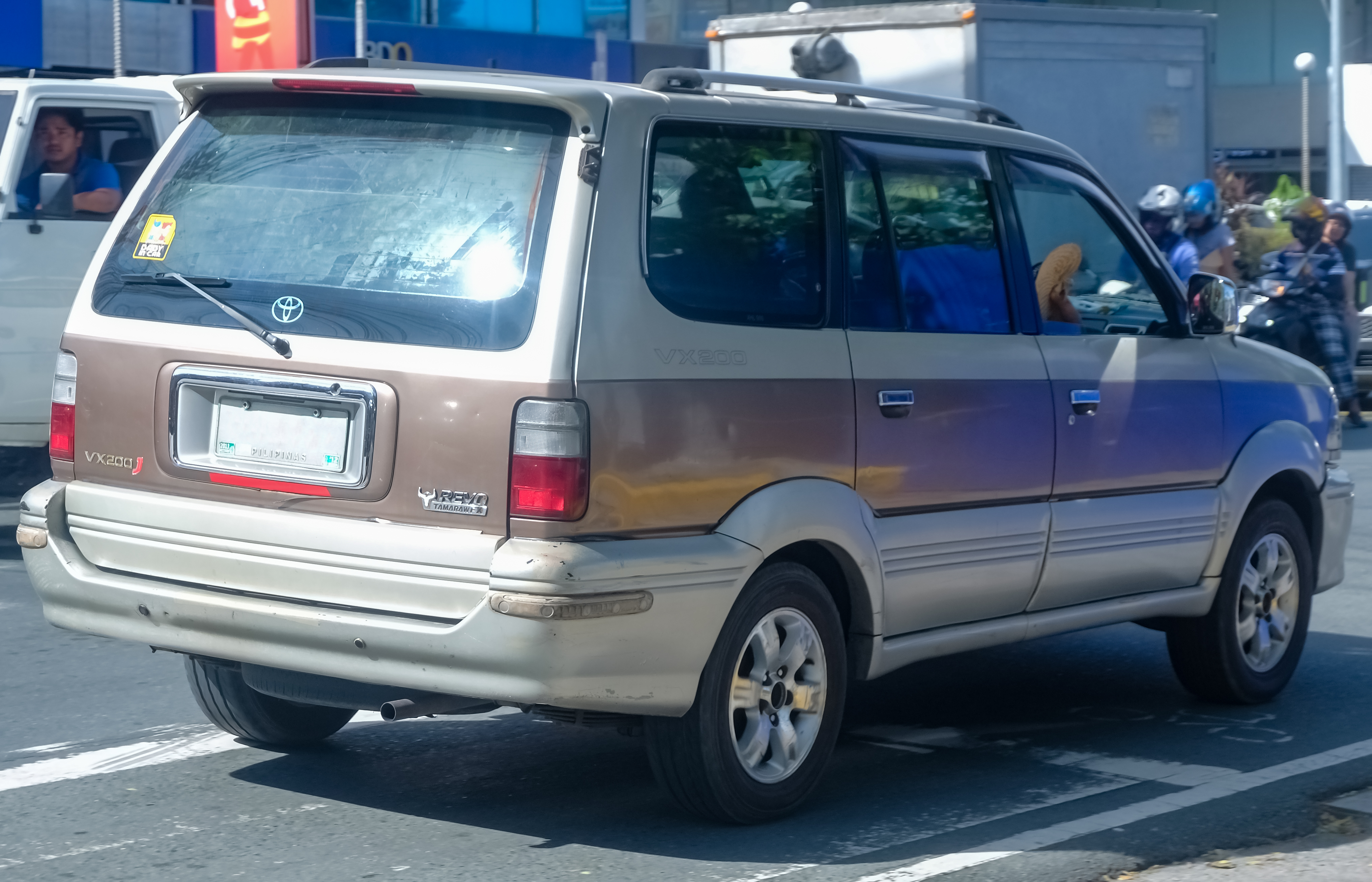
2002 Toyota Revo VX200-J (RZF81, Philippines)

2003–2005 (F82)

DLX, GL were the bottom trims to choose from while GLX, GSX and SR variants were considered the mid-range players. The VX240D (2L 2.4diesel) was introduced to the new lineup in mid-2004. The Revo received its third and last refreshing. The J series of Toyota vehicles were discontinued, hence the discontinuation of its two J-spec trim lines (SR-J and VX200-J). It received a badge revision, availability of new colours and exterior and interior details, including a 3 spoke steering wheel with a chrome Toyota logo, larger headlamps and fog lamps, J100 Land Cruiser style tail lamps (which are present in the fourth-generation Kijang), upgraded audio systems and other additional features. The top trim (VX200 and VX240D) received upgraded and reengineered adjustable leather seats, 2-tone leather door sidings, upgraded entertainment systems (motorised 2-DIN head unit with AVG input for the middle row seat's armrest - also in wood accent), wood panel appointments, side-steps (together with the SR trim) and upgraded dual DVD headrest monitors. Only VX200 variants were given a 12-volt auxiliary power outlet with cover in the left side of last row. The VX200 and SR variants were offered in fabric or leather options for the interior. For the SR, chrome appointments on the dashboard, a new livery was introduced, as well as the words "SPORT RUNNER" executed in plain text, discontinuing the use of the font used for the Supra. GLX and GSX trims received new wheels and different livery for the GSX.

It was discontinued in 2005 due to Toyota's IMV project. The last Revos were either sold to rental fleets, police departments, or people who want to snap the last few examples, until February 2005, where some are up for auction from government agencies and some for dropping from rental fleets and taxis.

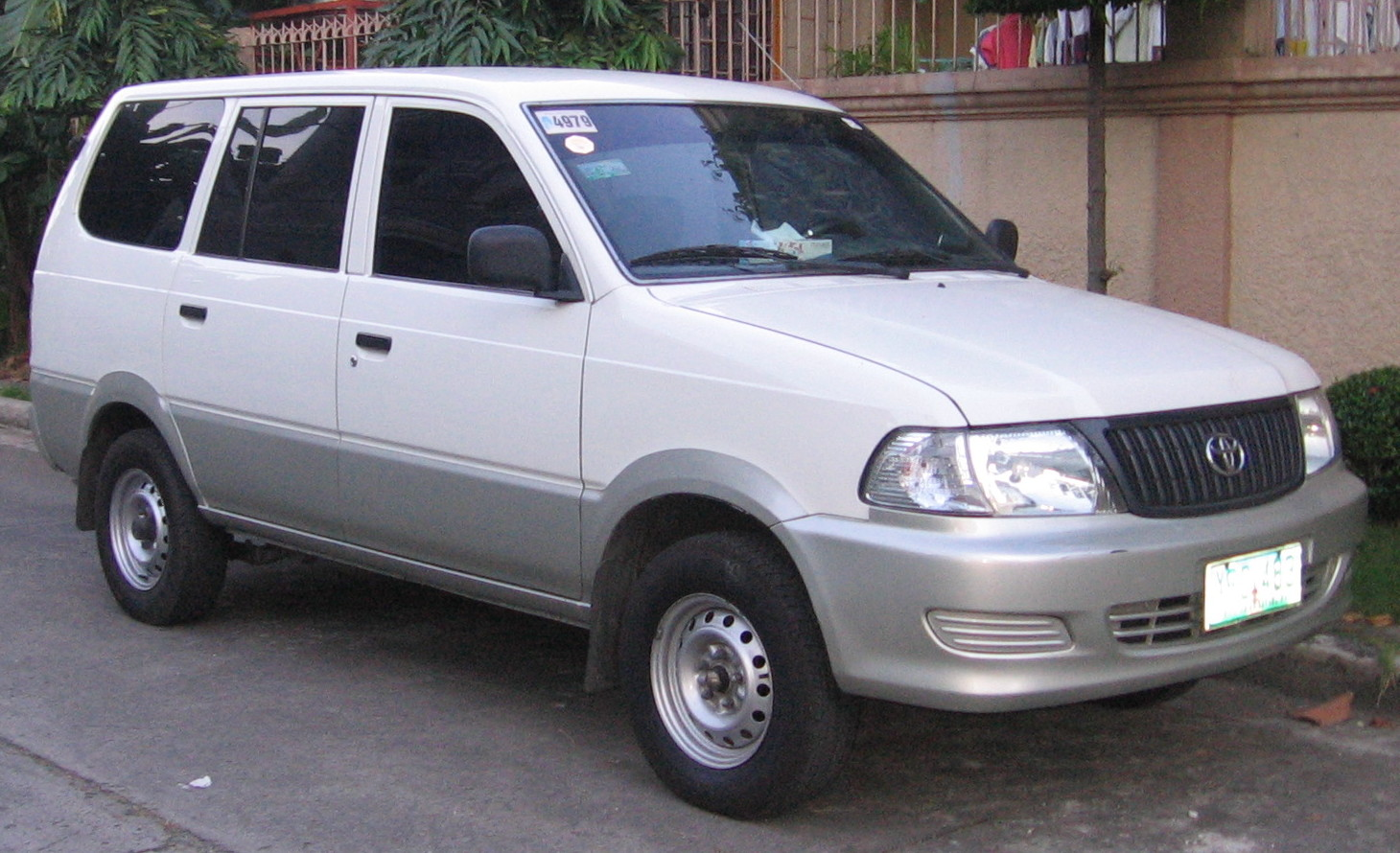
2003–2005 Toyota Revo DLX (Philippines)

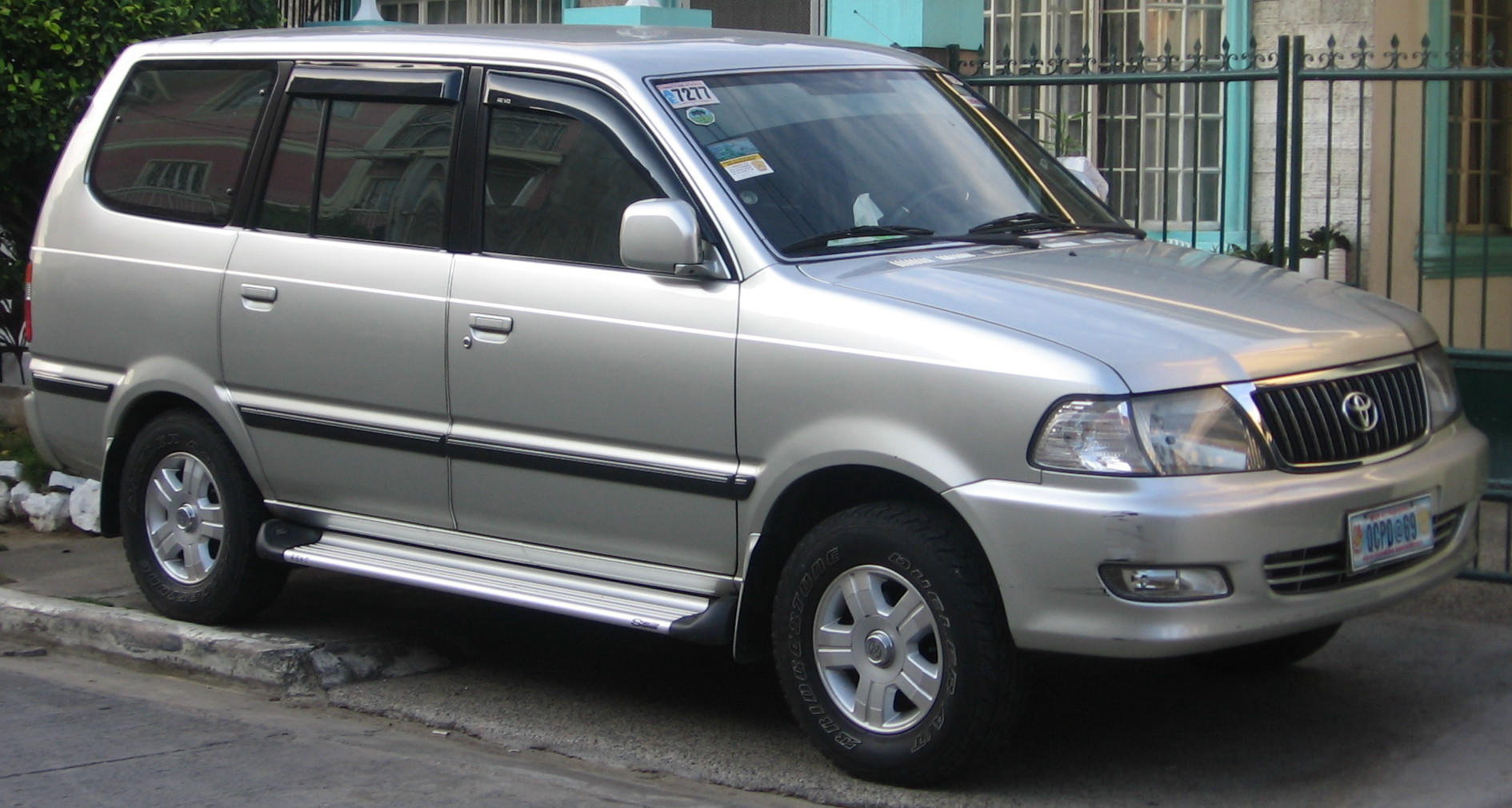
2003–2005 Toyota Revo GLX (Philippines)

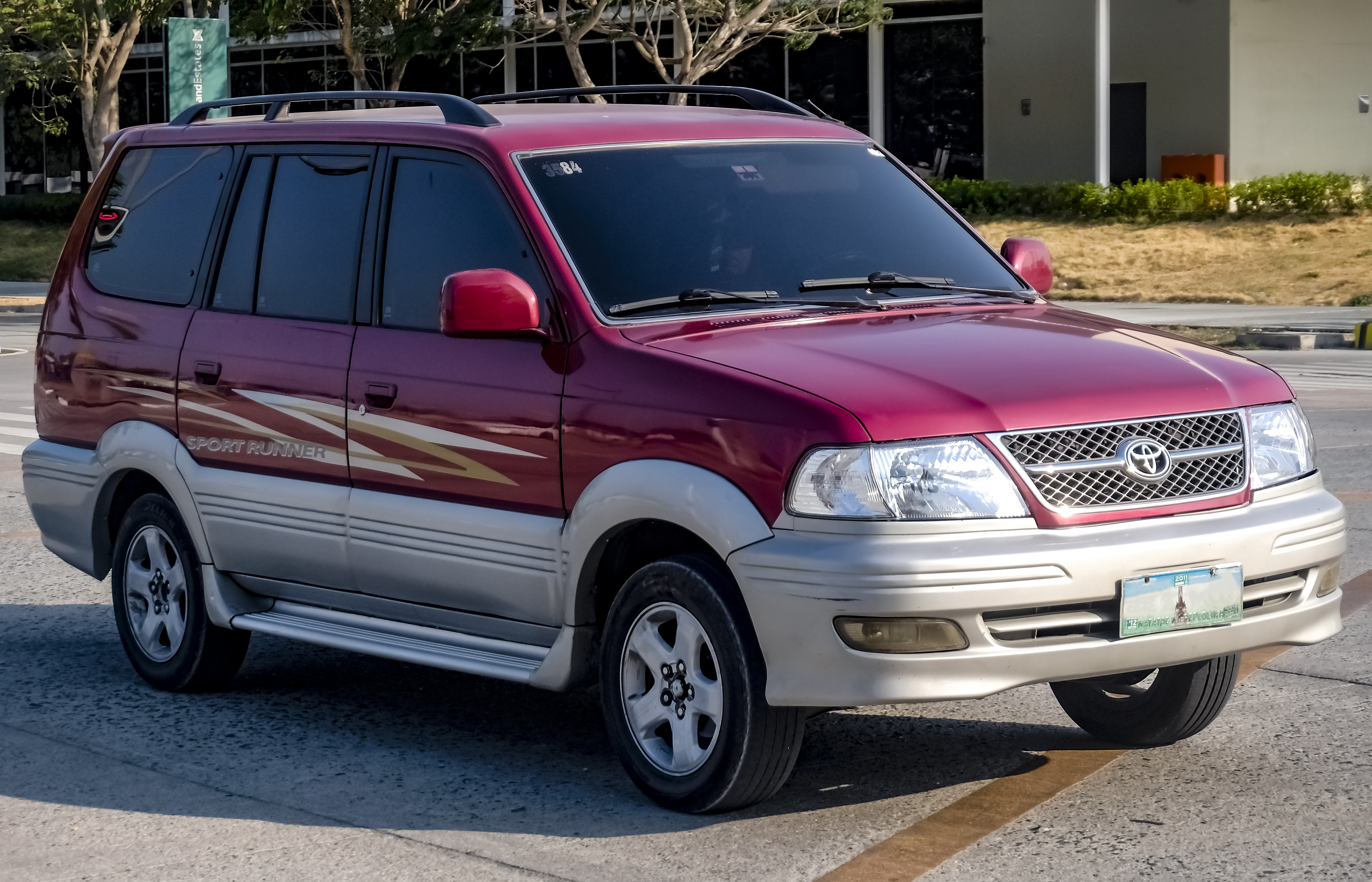
2003–2005 Toyota Revo 1.8 SR (KF82, Philippines)

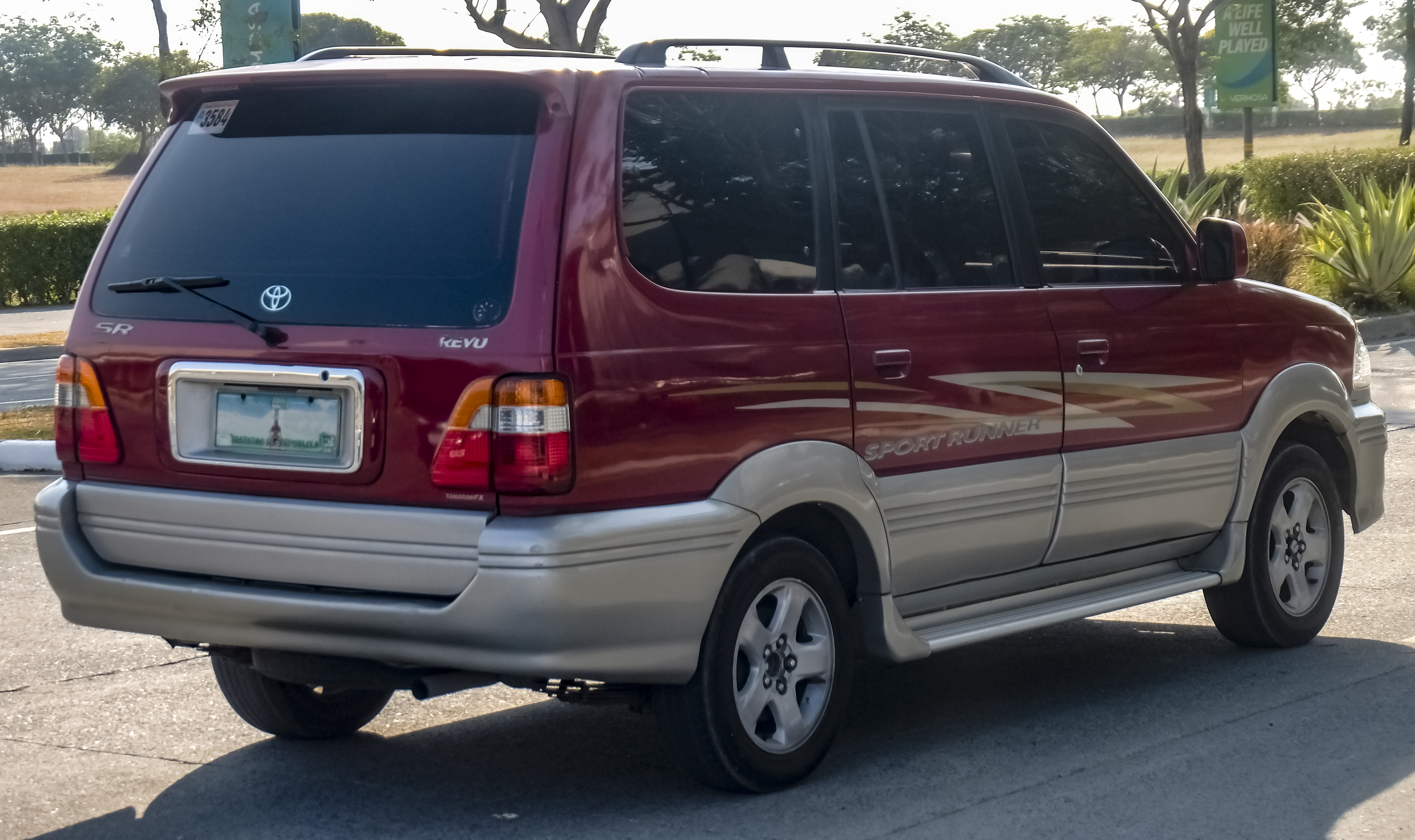
2003–2005 Toyota Revo 1.8 SR (KF82, Philippines)

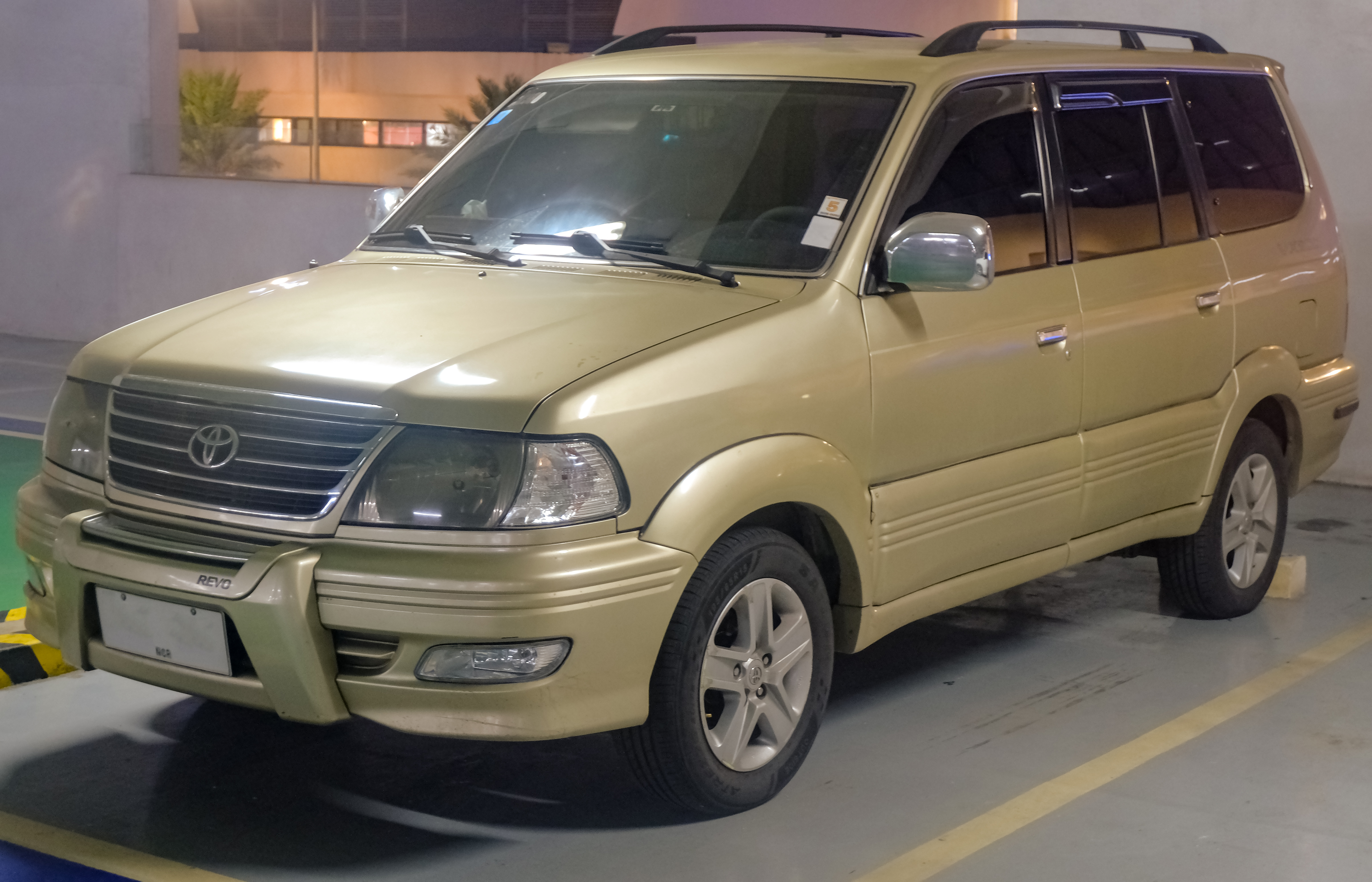
2003–2005 Toyota Revo VX200 (RZF82, Philippines)

=== Condor/Stallion (F60/F80/F81/F85 - African Markets) ===
The Zace Surf, Condor and Stallion are high-roof station wagon based on the long-wheelbase Kijang wagon. For the right hand drive South African market Condor and was initially offered with a choice of the 1.8-litre 2Y engine in the base Estate and Estate TE (later replaced by the 2.0-litre 1RZ-E in the second refresh), 2.4-litre 2RZ-E petrol engine and a 3.0-litre 5L diesel engine in either Estate TE and 4x4 RV trims. Unique to the Condor is the 7-seat configuration with second row individual seating, locks integrated to the inner door handles, Corolla-style outer door handles, and a lack of a rear cooler option. Available options are air conditioning for the base estate, leather seats for the RV (and later TX) or PVC seats (all trims). An 8-seat configuration later replaced the 7-seater with the second row seats being exchanged for a split 60/40 unit in the first refresh with the 4x4 RV trim being replaced by the new TX and TX 4x4 trims. The third row bench would get replaced by a 50/50 side folding unit in the second and final refresh model which also included the front end design as well as the rear taillights from the second facelift Kijang while still retaining cloth interior from the first Kijang facelift and the use of rubber seals in the rear window. The 2.4-litre petrol engine was also now made available to the base Estate trim alongside the new 2.0-litre engine while a driver airbag was added to the TX trim. The Condor was sold as well in Left hand drive Ghana and Nigerian markets with 1.8-litre 2Y and 3.0-litre 5L engines with a 10-seat configuration with a 4x4 option being available to the diesel models.

The Stallion Panel Van was introduced initially with a 1.8-litre 2Y engine sharing the F60 designation with the Kijang/Zace pickup (later replaced by a 2.0-litre 1RZ-E unit as a base engine in 2003 for both the South African market Condor and Stallion models) in a 3-seat configuration with no second row seats. Immobilisers were standard equipment throughout the entire South African Condor/Stallion (non 2Y SA models use a transponder key immobiliser) range while included as part of the 4x4 model in Ghana markets.

==== Racing ====
The Team Castrol Toyota Condor 2.4 RV 4x4 was prepared by Toyota South Africa's Research and Development Team in Prospecton, Durban for the South Africa National Off-Road Championship. Introduced in the 2001 season it was driven by Kassie Coetzee and co-driver Ockie Fourie until the 2003 season where it was replaced by a Hilux 3.0TD 4x4. Competing in the 4-cylinder production class category (Class E) modifications include an uprated engine (initially to 155 PS (114 kW; 153 hp), later increased to 170 PS (125 kW; 168 hp)), Addition of a rear limited slip differential, a 260-litre fuel tank, strengthened suspension, as well a roll cage and associated safety equipment. A heavy-duty clutch and high-temperature brake compound were fitted to aid endurance and a limiting valve was fitted to adjust brake bias however the rest of the brakes, gearbox, and transfer case remains standard. The vehicle was competitive even in its debut season, but found limited success throughout its racing career with only a single class win (7th overall) from the opening race of the 2002 season (Barberspan 500) before suffering multiple mishaps in the 2002 season that included a rock-throwing incident.

=== Zace/Zace Surf (F60/F80) ===
==== Taiwan ====
The left-hand drive Zace Surf for the Taiwanese market was available in both 5 and 8-seater configurations with a choice of either a 1.8-litre or 2.4-litre petrol engine. Anti-lock brakes were available with the 1.8-litre petrol engine as standard in Urban Wagon and pre-facelift GL models while available as an option in GL Limited, DX-Limited and DX trims with all 2.4-litre models receiving anti lock brakes as standard. A driver airbag was also standard equipment for Urban Wagon and pre-facelift GL models as well as in 4WD trims. The 8-seat configuration using a 50/50 split side folding unit with third row seatbelts as used in the Unser and late model Condors was initially offered as a trim level to both 1.8-litre and 2.4-litre 4WD models with the latter being discontinued in 2002. Both models are uncommon as owners opted to install aftermarket bench seats to 5-seater models instead. Refreshed models more closely mimic the changes made in the Kijang's second refresh that included the suede interior as well the use of compound sealant for the rear glass. Unique to the Zace Surf is the use of a printed window antenna, the option of a roof mounted VCD player and a car phone in later, higher end trims like the VX-surf or VX Prerunner. All Zace Surfs with the 2.4-litre engine use the 4x4's taller suspension unlike the Condor. 4x4 models uses a full-time 4WD system with a lockable centre differential and high/low range transfer case.

==== Vietnam ====
The Toyota Zace was introduced to Vietnam in 1999 as the GL and DX equipped with 1.8 litre EFI petrol engine with 61 kW (83 PS) at 4,800 rpm. The DX version has a lower comfort profile than the GL version with a manual external rearview mirror, no front fog lights and no tachometer. In 2000, the Zace got a redesigned front and the 1.8-litre engine was increased to 2.0-litres. The second upgrade was introduced in 2003 with an improved front and rear.

In 2004, Toyota introduced the GL limited with 200 units produced, a revised exterior, wood-panelled interior, and upholstered seats.

In 2005, Toyota introduced the Zace Surf with an improved exterior that included larger wings and front bumper, chrome exterior door handles and windshield surrounds, and 15-inch wheels. The interior was equipped with a wood-panelled console, CD player, 6-speaker audio and leather seats.

The Zace was a successful model and also the best-selling model of Toyota Motor Vietnam in 2005 with 5,634 units. The total number of cars sold from launch to the end of production was 17,268 units.

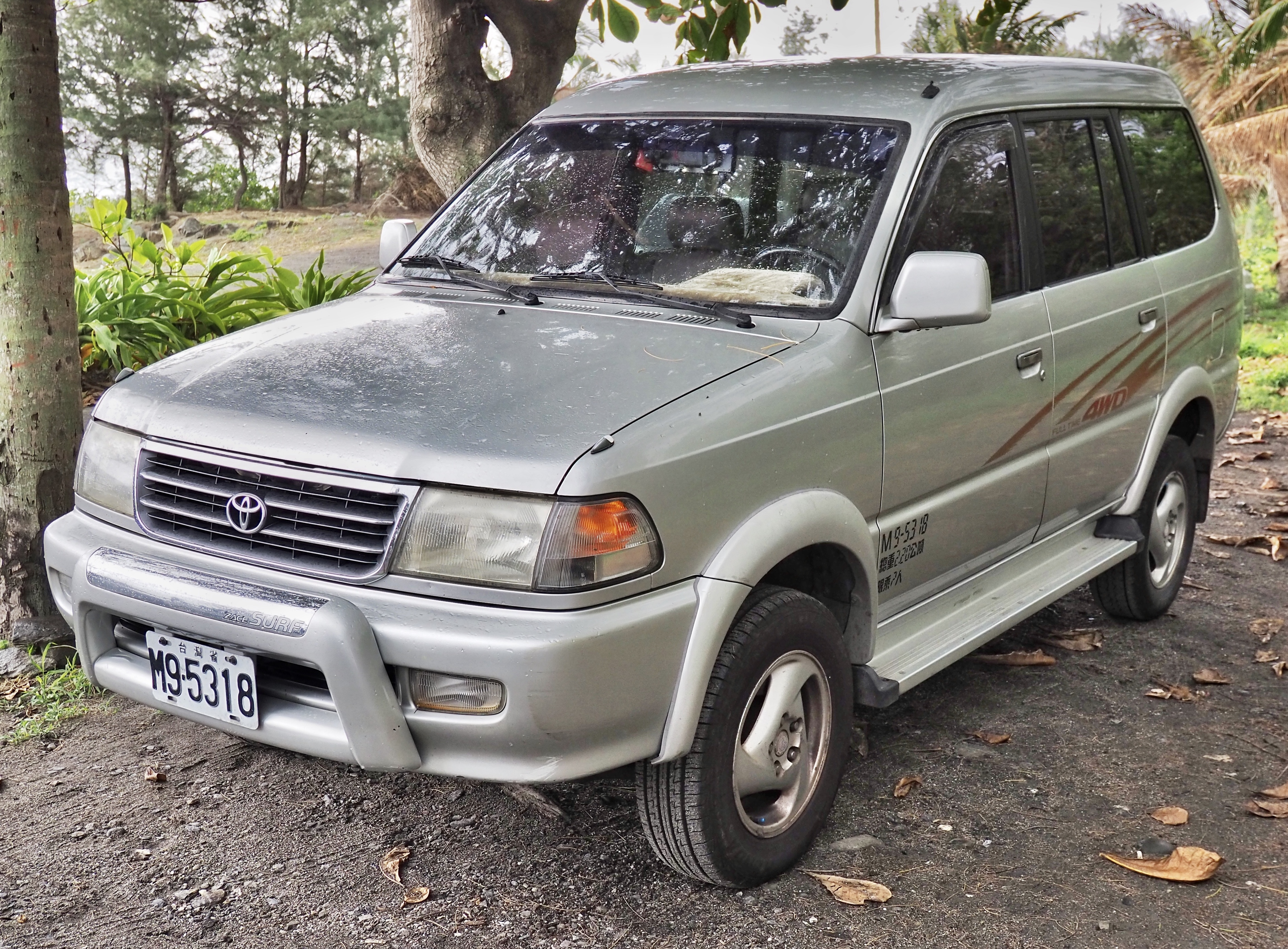
2001 Toyota Zace Surf 2.4 Full-Time 4WD (Taiwan)

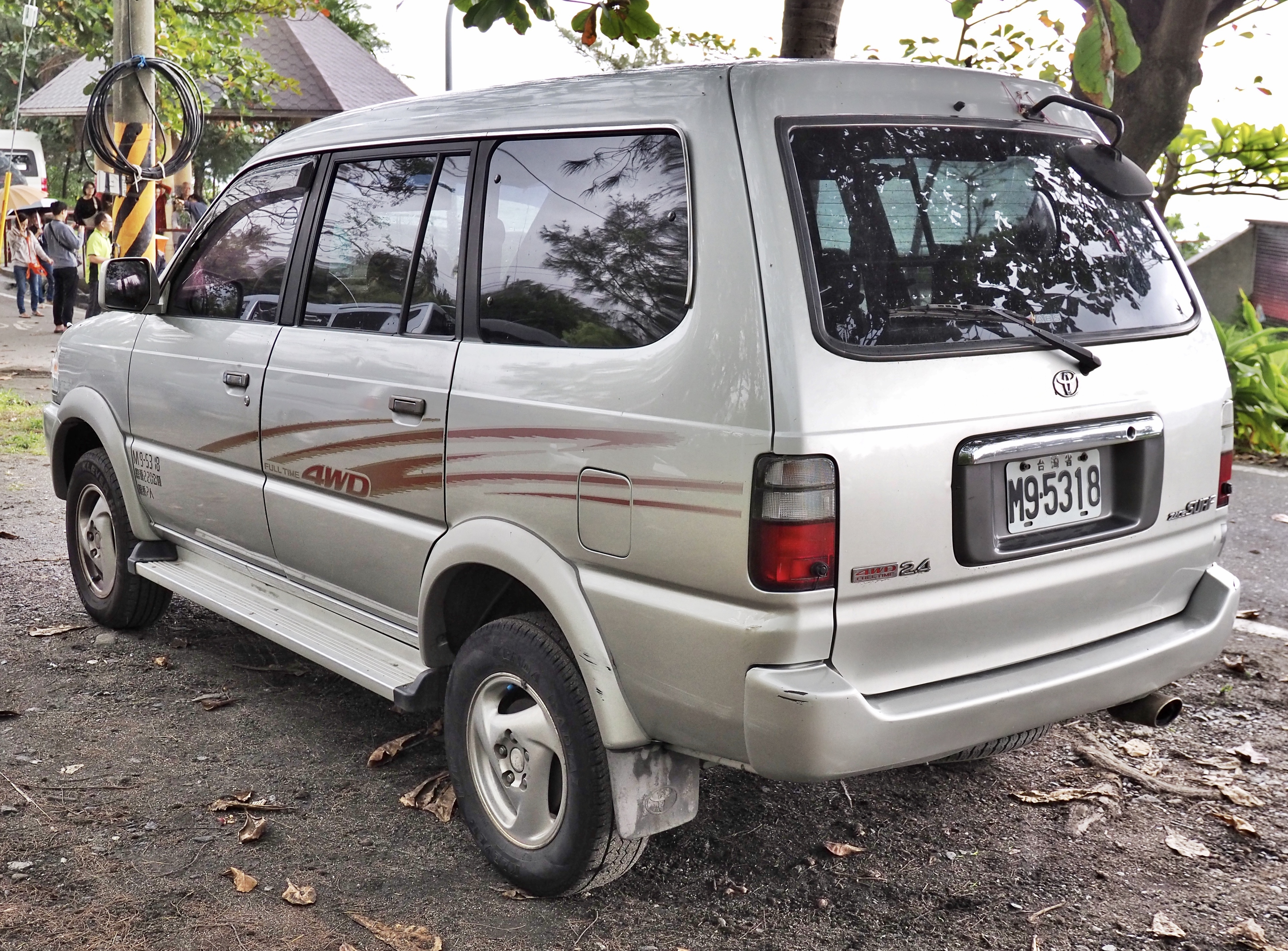
2001 Toyota Zace Surf 2.4 Full-Time 4WD (Taiwan)

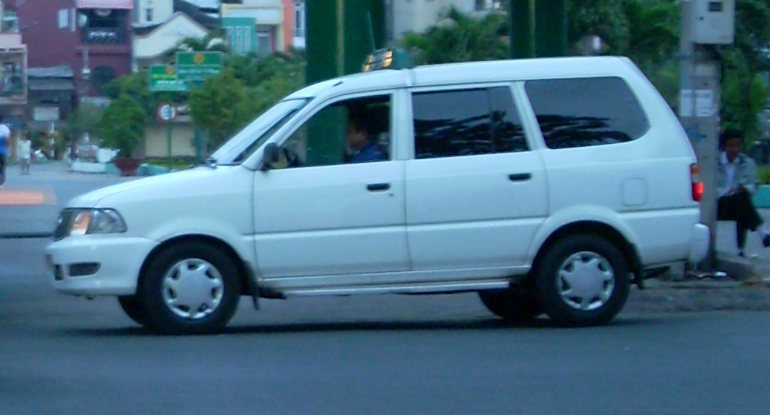
Toyota Zace DX (Vietnam)

== Replacement ==
Due to its diversified roles in its respective markets, the Kijang was succeeded by the Avanza and IMV platform vehicles.

Toyota replaced the Kijang station wagon across Southeast Asia with the smaller Avanza in 2003, and the larger Innova in 2004. The latter has been retailed by Toyota Astra Motor in Indonesia as the "Kijang Innova" to retain its linkage with the original model. Therefore, Toyota categorise the three generations of the Innova as the fifth, sixth and seventh-generation Kijang. The Kijang pickup was sold until early 2007, when it was replaced by the Hilux pickup truck to comply with the Euro 2 emission standards.

The Indian market Qualis was replaced by the Innova, skipping the fourth-generation model entirely.

The Malaysian market Unser was sold alongside the Avanza introduced in late 2004 until the middle of 2005, when it was discontinued in favor of the Innova being introduced.

The Innova was marketed in 2005 as the successor to the Revo in the Philippine market with marketing material referring to the Innova as "A Beautiful [R]evolution" referencing the Revo nameplate. Given the family oriented nature of the Innova, taxi and commercial businesses served previously by the entry-level DLX and GL Revo trims were now served by the Avanza, while the upmarket SR and VX trims now being catered to by the Fortuner SUV. Commercial variants of the Tamaraw FX were succeeded by the Hilux FX and LiteAce FX utility vans, both carrying over the "FX" nameplate, and the Hilux Cargo closed van, along with the panel van, dropside pick-up, and aluminium van variants of the LiteAce, released in 2022. In 2024, the Tamaraw nameplate was resurrected as the nameplate for the Philippine-market Hilux Champ.

The Taiwanese Zace Surf was replaced with the Innova equipped with the 2.7 L 2TR-FE petrol engine with no replacement for the four-wheel-drive variant and pickup truck. The Fortuner, then codenamed IMV4, was slated to be launched by local distributor Hotai Motors as to reflect the Zace Surf's then current lineup however due to strategic consideration by Toyota, the Innova was launched in 2007 instead with the 2TR-FE to meet emission regulations with the smaller 1TR-FE being introduced later to replace the larger engine. In 2016, the Innova was discontinued from the Taiwanese market with the second-generation Innova not slated to be introduced.

The Africa/Ghana market Condor was replaced by the Fortuner in 2006, Avanza in 2007 and Innova introduced in late 2011, while panel van duties served by the African market Stallion were passed onto a panel van version of the Avanza introduced in late 2013. The second-generation Innova is not introduced to the South African market due to shrinking MPV market and poor sales.

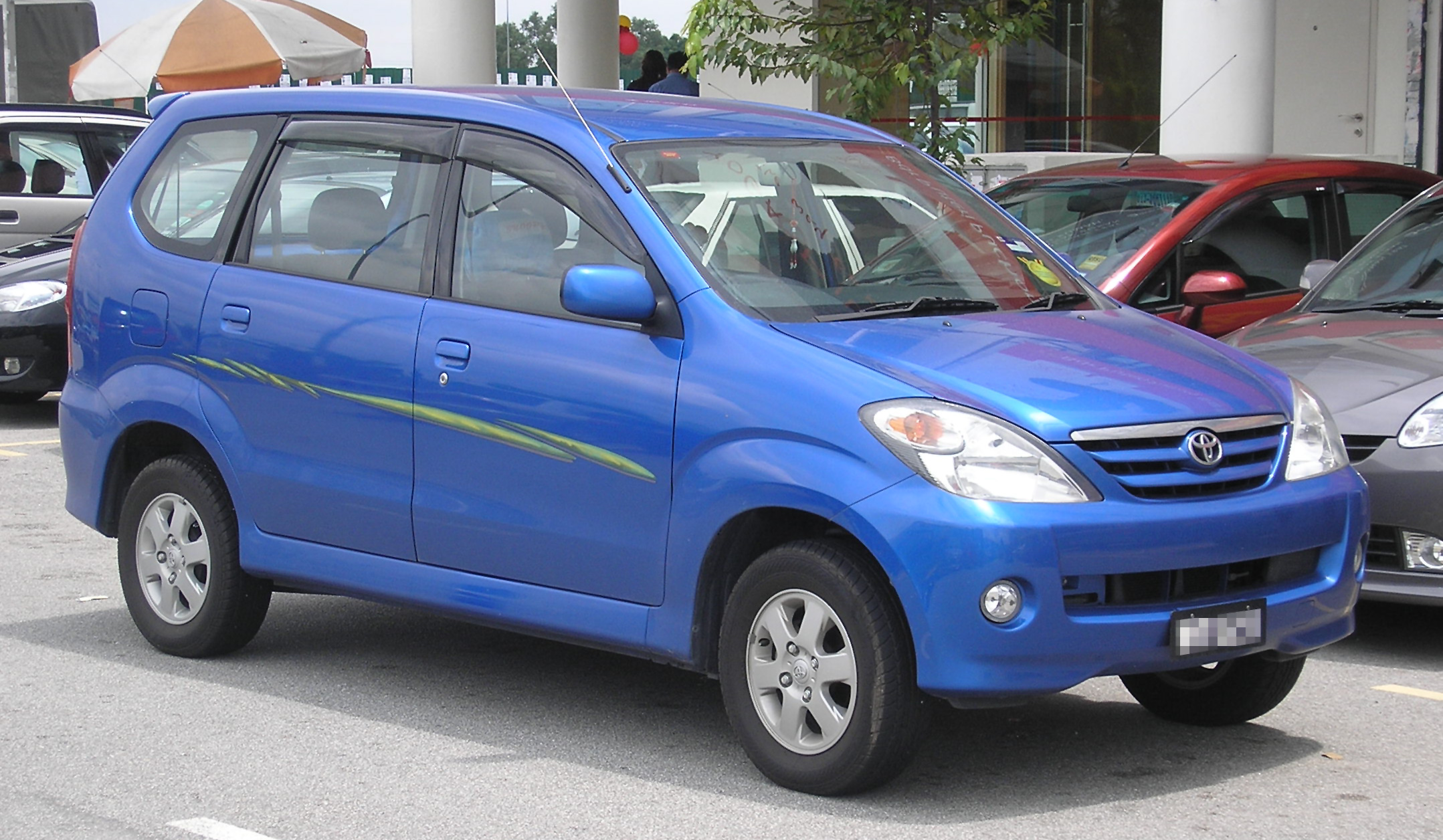
Toyota Avanza

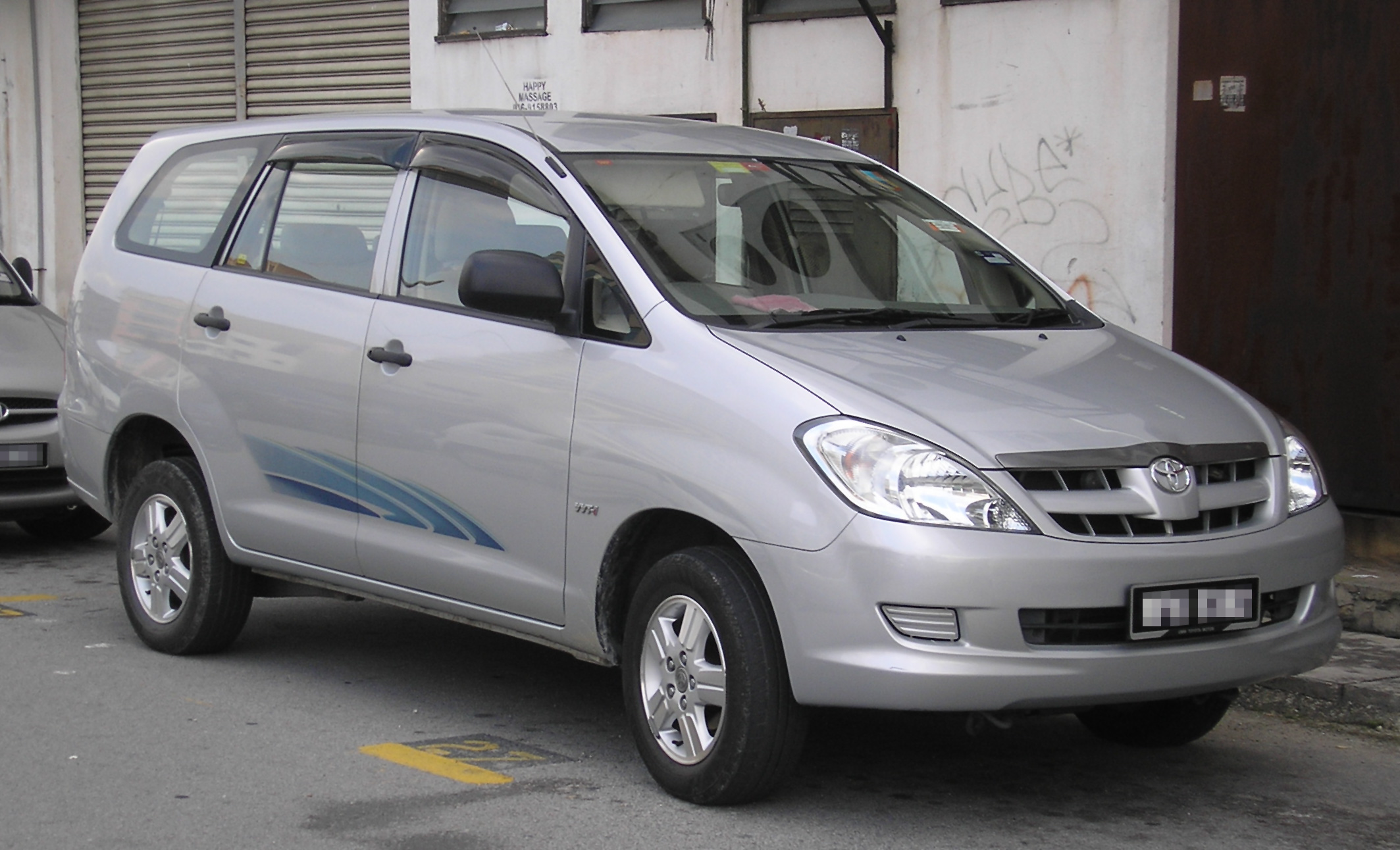
Toyota Innova/Kijang Innova

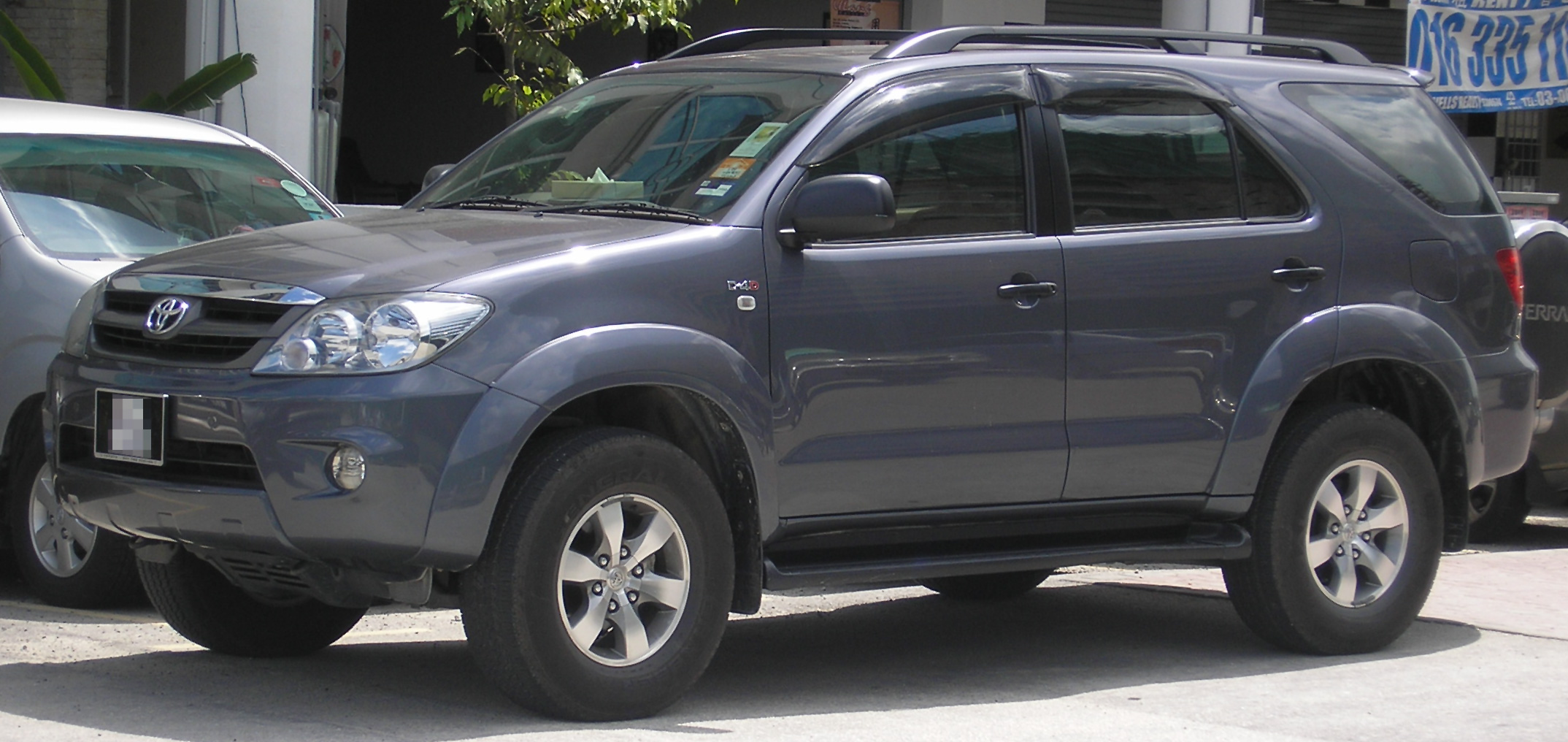
Toyota Fortuner

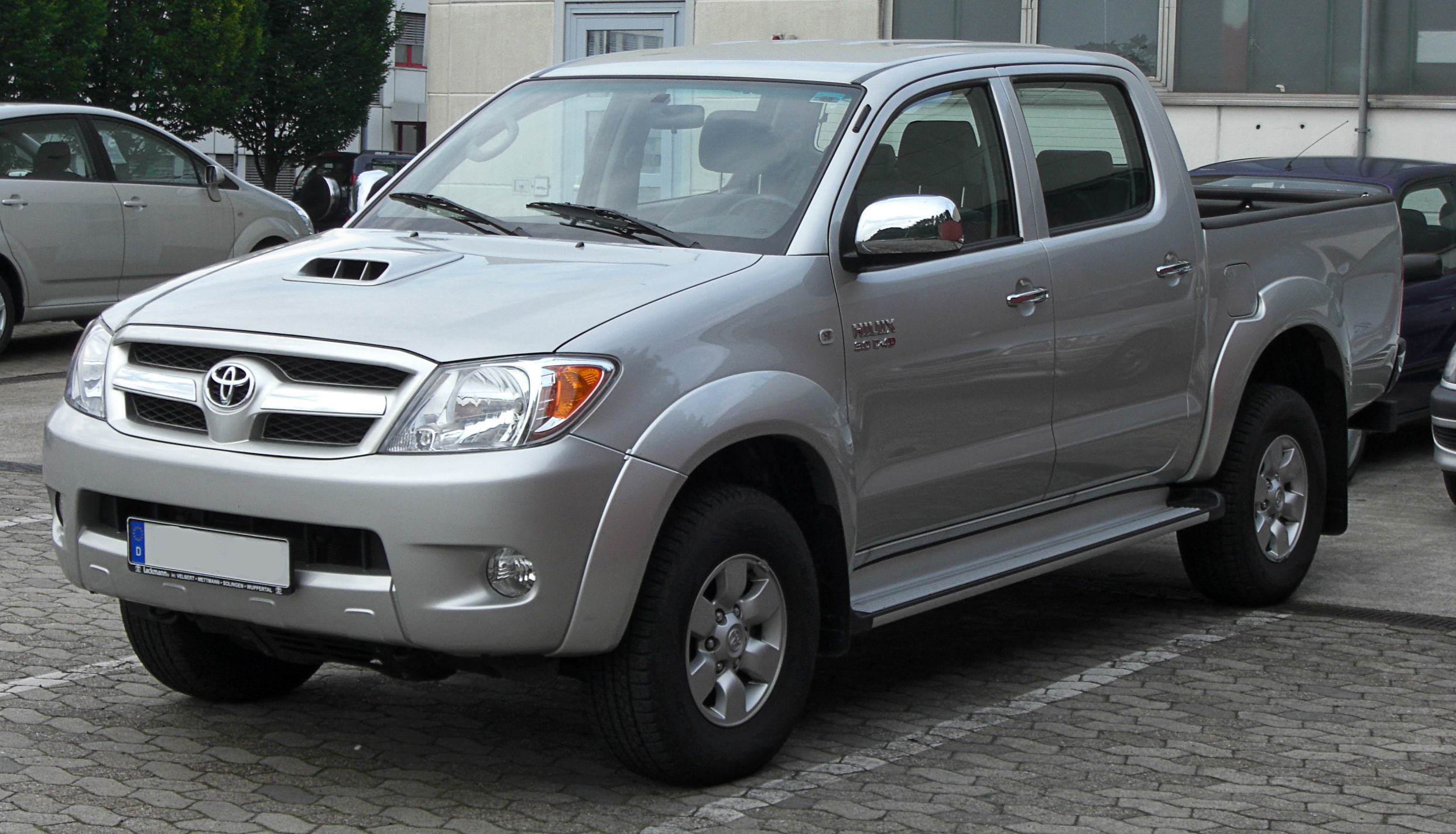
Toyota Hilux (seventh generation)

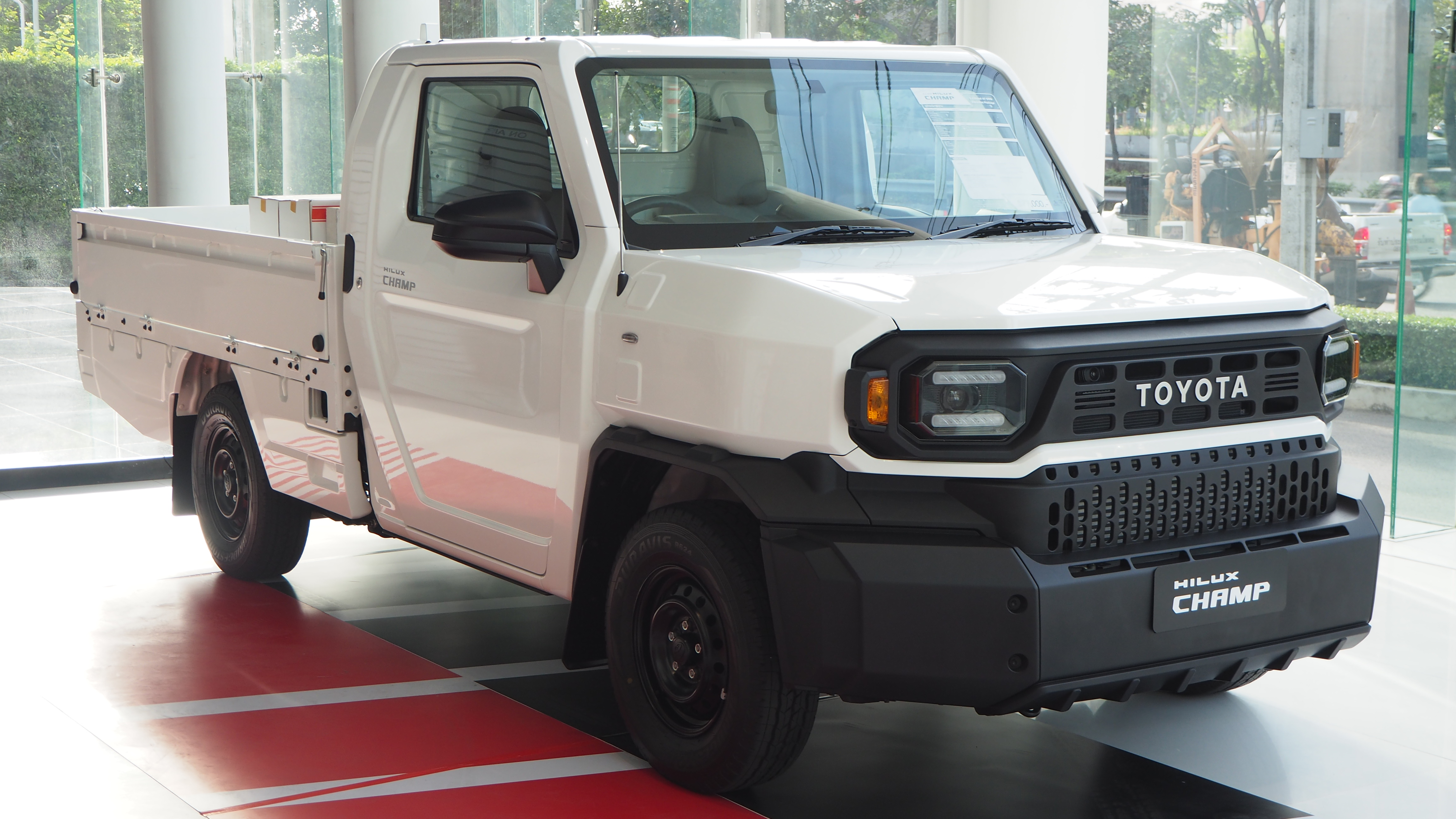
Toyota Hilux Champ

== Production and sales ==
=== Production ===
Model	Year	Production (Indonesia)
First generation	1977–1981	26,806
Second generation	1981–1986	61,449
Third generation	1986–1997	525,615
Fourth generation	1997–2005	452,017
Total		1,065,887

=== Sales ===
Year	Indonesia
1977	1,168
1978	4,624
1985	19,323
1987	82,687
1991	60,053
1992	36,551
1993	39,275
1994	63,599
1995	77,695
1996	56,831
1997	81,134
1998	14,831
1999	22,943
2000	71,492
2001	61,734
2002	64,894
2003	74,260

== See also ==
- List of Toyota vehicles
