= Toyota Land Cruiser =

Series of four-wheel drive vehicles produced by Toyota

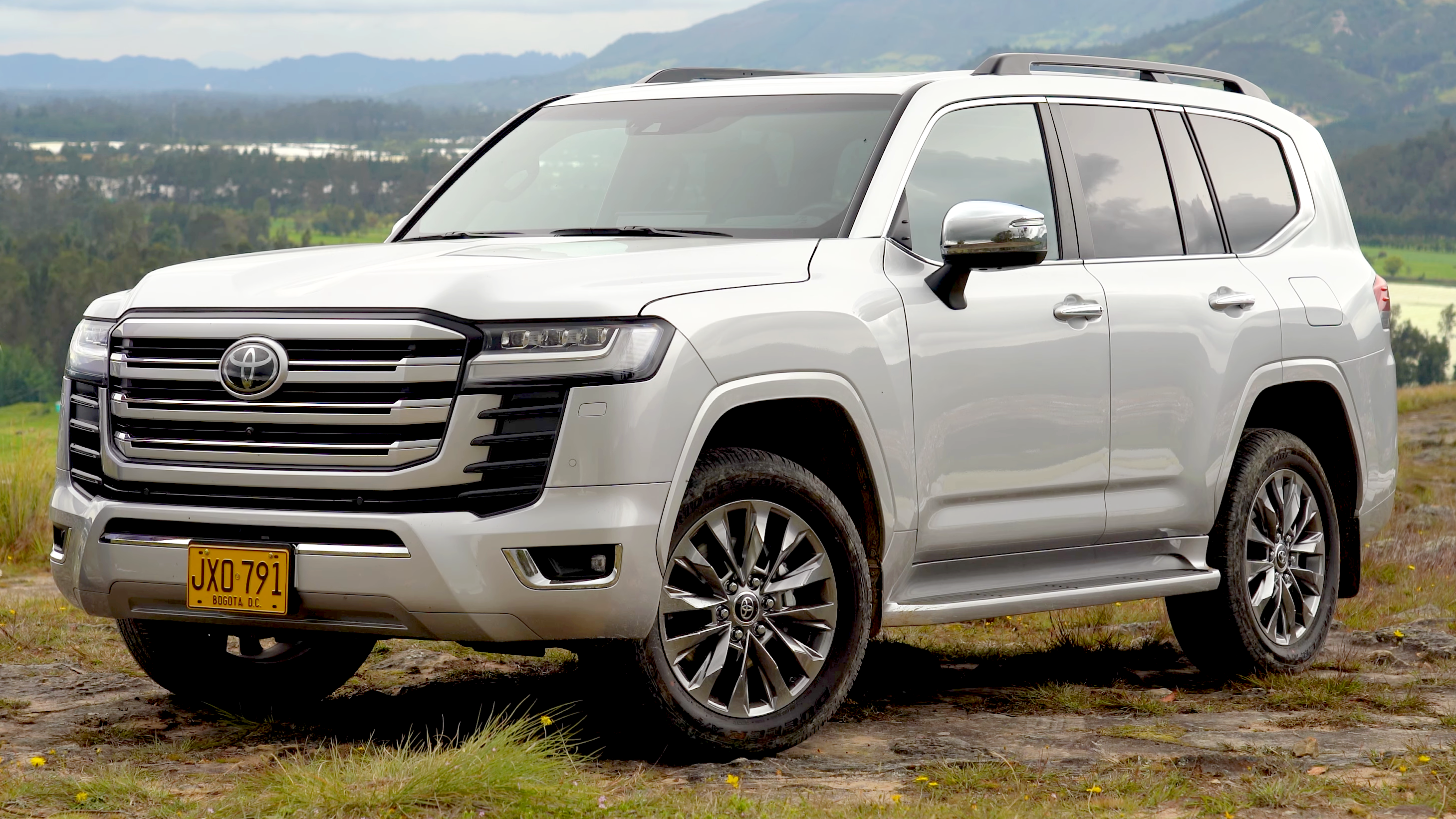
- 2021 Toyota Land Cruiser ZX (VJA300, Colombia)

Overview
- Manufacturer: Toyota
- Production: 1951–present

Body and chassis
- Class: Off-road vehicle; Full-size SUV (J)
- Layout: Front-engine, four-wheel-drive
- Chassis: Body-on-frame

The Toyota Land Cruiser (Japanese: トヨタ・ランドクルーザー, Hepburn: Toyota Rando-Kurūzā), also sometimes spelt as LandCruiser, is a series of four-wheel drive vehicles produced by the Japanese automobile manufacturer Toyota. It is Toyota's longest running series of models. As of 2019, the sales of the Land Cruiser totalled more than 10 million units worldwide.

Production of the first generation of the Land Cruiser began in 1951. The Land Cruiser has been produced in convertible, hardtop, station wagon and cab chassis body styles. The Land Cruiser's reliability and longevity have led to huge popularity, especially in Australia, where it is the best-selling body-on-frame, four-wheel drive vehicle. Toyota also extensively tests the Land Cruiser in the Australian outback – considered to be one of the toughest operating environments in both temperature and terrain. In Japan, the Land Cruiser was once exclusive to Toyota Japanese dealerships called Toyota Store.

Since 1990, the smaller variation of the Land Cruiser has been marketed as the Land Cruiser Prado. Described as a "light-duty" version of the Land Cruiser by Toyota, it features a different design compared to the full-size model and, up until 2023, it remains the only comfort-oriented Land Cruiser available with a short-wheelbase 3-door version.

In 2025, an even smaller variation called Land Cruiser FJ was introduced. It is built on the IMV platform shared with the Hilux.

As of 2023, the full-size Land Cruiser was available in many markets. Exceptions include the United States (since 2021 where the smaller Land Cruiser Prado has been sold under the Land Cruiser name since 2024), Canada (since 1996), Malaysia (which receives the Lexus LX instead), Hong Kong, Macau, South Korea, Brazil, and most of Europe. In Europe, the only countries where the full-size Land Cruiser is officially sold are Gibraltar, Moldova, Russia, Belarus, and Ukraine. The Land Cruiser is hugely popular in the Middle East, Russia, Australia, India, Bangladesh, Pakistan, New Caledonia, and Africa. It is used by farmers, the construction industry, non-governmental and humanitarian organizations, the United Nations, national armies (often the pickup version), and irregular armed groups who turn them into "technicals" by mounting machine guns in the rear. In August 2019, cumulative global sales of the Land Cruiser family surpassed 10 million units.

== Origin ==
In 1936, the Imperial Japanese Army introduced the Kurogane Type 95 Four Wheel Drive reconnaissance car. However, in a separate development, in 1941, the Japanese government asked Toyota to develop a light truck for the military. And after the Empire of Japan occupied the Philippines, then a self-governed American colony, during 1941–1942, a captured Bantam GP (or Willys MB) was sent to Japan for assessment and testing. Japanese military authorities subsequently requested that Toyota produce a similar vehicle, albeit with an altered external appearance.

The prototype Model AK led to the Yon-Shiki Kogata Kamotsu-Sha (四式小型 貨物 車 type 4 compact cargo-truck). The half-ton truck featured an upright front grille, flat front wheel arches that angled down and back (like the later FJ40), headlights mounted above the wheel arches on either side of the radiator, and a folding windshield.

Production AK10 vehicles were powered by the 2,259 cc (2.3 L), 4-cylinder Type C engine from the Toyota Model AE sedan coupled to a three-speed manual transmission and a two-speed transfer gearbox. Unlike the U.S. Jeep, the AK10 had limited use and photographs of it in the battlefield are rare.

In June 1954, responding to claims of trademark violation by the Willys Company that produced the original Jeep, then Director of Technology Hanji Umehara renamed the vehicle "Land Cruiser."

The postwar Toyota "Jeep" BJ is completely different from the AK10 and inherits no mechanical parts from it. However, a lot of lessons learned while developing the AK10 were applied when developing the BJ.

== Lineage ==
Toyota divided the Land Cruiser family into four series. The most basic version is the "heavy-duty" series, which prioritizes functionality, durability and off-road capabilities over comfort or technology. It is also characterised by flatter steel body panels and a near vertical greenhouse. Models considered as "heavy-duty" by Toyota are the BJ, FJ, 20, 40 and 70 series.

The "station wagon" series of the Land Cruiser has more emphasis on comfort and interior space. The "station wagon" series first appeared in 1967 as the 55 series Land Cruiser Station Wagon, which was conceived as a four-wheel drive vehicle for recreational use with sufficient space to carry an entire family – a format that was popular with customers in the U.S., and later commonly known as sport utility vehicles. Models considered as part of the 'station wagon' series are the 55, 60, 80, 100, 200, and 300 series.

Since the 70 series, the "light-duty" series has been offered. Primarily tuned for the European market, it was intended to be a more comfortable version of the "heavy-duty" series by adopting coil spring suspension, while being smaller and more affordable than the 'station wagon' series. Since 1990, the "light-duty" series gained an additional moniker for some markets, Prado, coinciding with the release of the 90 series Land Cruiser that was designed to be more comfort oriented. "Light-duty" models included the 70 wagon, 90, 120, 150 and 250 series.

The fourth series, named Land Cruiser FJ, is a model slotted below the Prado. It was unveiled in October 2025 and went on sale in 2026.

Availability of these series varies by market. Until 2021, the U.S. and Canada received the "station wagon" model, but switched to the smaller "light-duty" model with the release of the 250 series in 2023. Most of Europe received the "light-duty" model, while only several European countries also received the "station wagon" model.

Timeline of the Toyota Land Cruiser, 1951–present

== Heavy Duty series ==
=== BJ and FJ (1951) ===
BJ and FJ
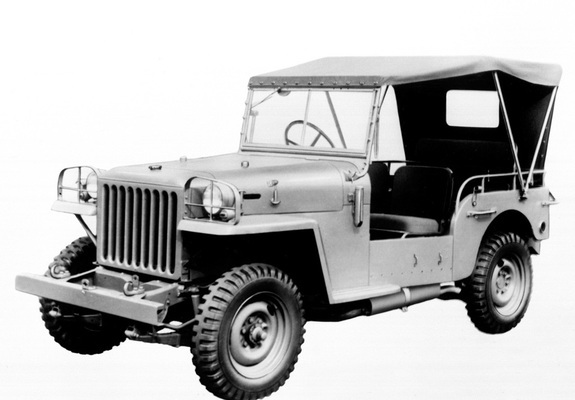

Overview
- Also called: Toyota Jeep BJ (1951–1954)
- Production: 1951–1955
- Assembly: Japan: Toyota City (Arakawa Auto Body)

Body and chassis
- Body style: 2-door softtop
- Layout: Front-engine, four-wheel-drive

Powertrain
- Engine: 3.4 L B I6; 3.9 L F I6
- Transmission: 4-speed manual

Dimensions
- Wheelbase: 2,400 mm (94.5 in)
- Length: 3,793 mm (149.3 in)
- Width: 1,575 mm (62.0 in)
- Height: 1,900 mm (74.8 in)
- Curb weight: 1,425 kg (3,141.6 lb)

==== History ====
In 1950, the Korean War created demand for a military light utility vehicle. The United States government ordered 100 vehicles with the then-new Willys specifications and tasked Toyota to manufacture them. The Toyota "Jeep" BJ prototype was developed in January 1951. This came from the demand for military-type utility vehicles, much like the British Land Rover Series 1 that was developed in 1948. The Jeep BJ was larger than the original U.S. Jeep and more powerful courtesy of its Type B 3.4-litre six-cylinder OHV Four-stroke petrol engine which generated a power output of 63 kW (84 hp; 85 PS) at 3,600 rpm and 215 N⋅m (159 lb⋅ft) of torque at 1,600 rpm. It had a part-time four-wheel drive system like the Jeep. However, and unlike the Jeep, the Jeep BJ had no low-range transfer case. In July 1951, Toyota's test driver Ichiro Taira drove the next generation of the Jeep BJ prototype up to the sixth stage of Mount Fuji, the first vehicle to climb that height. The test was overseen by the National Police Agency (NPA). Impressed by this feat, the NPA quickly placed an order for 289 of these off-road vehicles, making the Jeep BJ their official patrol car.

For the first two years, manufacture was exclusively to order and in small volumes. In 1953, however, regular production of the "Toyota Jeep BJ" began at the Toyota Honsya Plant (rolling chassis assembly). The body assembly and painting were done at Arakawa Bankin Kogyo KK, later known as ARACO (now an affiliate of Toyota Auto Body Company). The "Toyota Jeep BJ" Series was introduced in the following variants:

- BJ-T (Touring),
- BJ-R (Radio),
- BJ-J (Cowl-chassis for a fire-engine).

In June 1954, the name "Land Cruiser" was coined by the technical director Hanji Umehara. "In England we had another competitor – Land Rover. I had to come up with a name for our car that would not sound less dignified than those of our competitors. That is why I decided to call it "Land Cruiser", he recalls. The name had already been used on the Studebaker Land Cruiser which was produced from 1934 to 1954. The 92 kW (123 hp; 125 PS), 3.9 L Type F petrol engine was added to the Land Cruiser range for the first time, originally only in the fire-engine chassis. The models were renamed:

- BJ-T (Touring),
- BJ-R (Radio),
- BJ-J (Cowl-chassis for a fire-engine),
- FJ-J (Cowl-chassis for a fire-engine).

=== J20 (1955) ===
J20
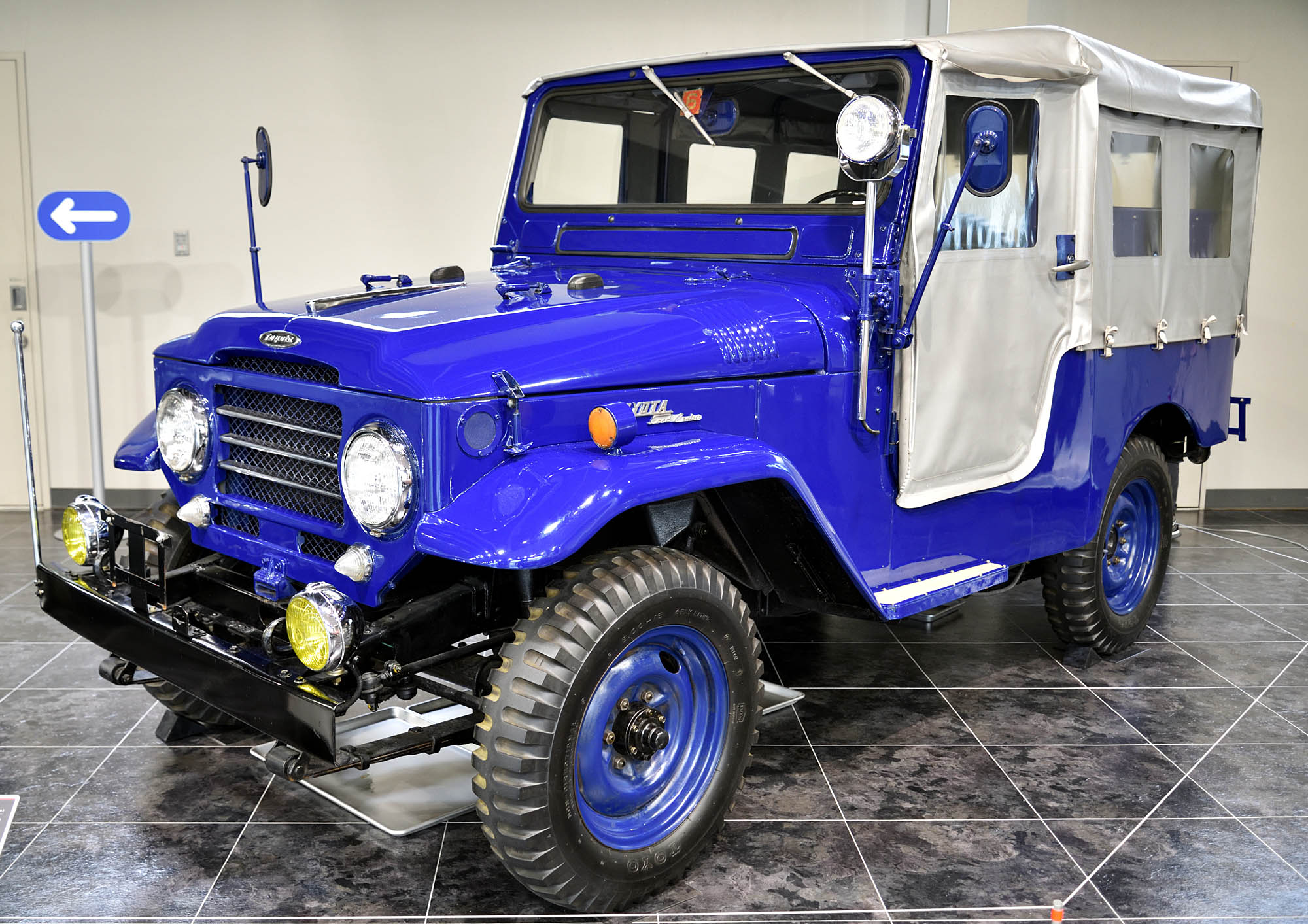

Overview
- Also called: Toyota Bandeirante (Brazil)
- Production: 1955–1960 (Japan); 1958–1968 (Brazil)
- Assembly: Japan: Toyota City (Arakawa Auto Body); Brazil: São Bernardo (Toyota do Brasil)

Body and chassis
- Body style: 2-door softtop; 2-door hardtop; 2-door pickup truck; 5-door station wagon
- Layout: Front-engine, four-wheel-drive

Powertrain
- Engine: 3.4 L Mercedes OM324 (Bandeirante) I4; 3.4 L B I6; 3.9 L F I6

Dimensions
- Wheelbase: 2,285 mm (90.0 in); 2,430 mm (95.7 in); 2,650 mm (104.3 in)

==== History ====
- 1955 – The second generation of the Land Cruiser called the 20 Series was introduced. It was designed to have a more civilian appeal than the BJ for export reasons. It also had more stylish bodywork and a better ride courtesy of longer four-plate leaf springs which had been adapted from the Toyota Light Truck. It had a more powerful 99 kW (135 PS; 133 hp) 3.9 L six-cylinder Type F petrol engine, but adopted the previous generation's three-speed gearbox. The interior of the vehicles were made more comfortable by moving the engine 120 mm (4.7 in) forward. The 20 Series still had no low range transfer case, but had synchromesh on the third and fourth gears.
- 1958 – FJ25 production commenced in Brazil; this being the first Toyota vehicle built outside Japan. These were sold as the "Toyota Bandeirante" from January 1962 when the Toyota petrol engine was replaced with a Mercedes-Benz diesel engine. The word "bandeirante" means "flag carrier" in Portuguese. The FJ25 models were built until August 1968 in Brazil. Production numbers were fairly low; in 1965, the production total was 961 vehicles.
- 1959 – The Land Cruiser first imported into Australia by B&D Motors as the FJ25/28 cab chassis with Australian made bodies. The Land Cruiser was the first Japanese vehicle to be regularly exported to the country. A small number of Land Cruisers were initially used in the Snowy Mountains Scheme by contractor Thiess Constructions.

==== Bandeirante timeline (Brazil) ====
- 1959:
  - FJ25 – Short open (topless) bush-drive car – Toyota F engine (May 1959 to 1960/61) – new in 1959 (also referred to as FJ251)
- 1960/1961:
  - FJ25L – Short soft top bush-drive car – Toyota F engine (1960/1961 to 1960/1961) – new in 1960/1961 (also referred to as FJ251L)
  - FJ151L – Short soft top bush-drive car – Toyota 2F engine (1960/1961 to December 1961) – replaces the FJ25/FJ251 and the FJ25L/FJ251L (there are few mentions in literature and no preserved ones known; it could be even doubted if it is ever been actually built)
- 1962:
  - TB25L – Short soft top bush-drive car – Mercedes-Benz OM-324 engine (January 1962 to – 1966?) – replaces the FJ151L (or FJ25L/FJ251L?)
  - TB25L – Short hard top bush-drive car – Mercedes-Benz OM-324 engine (January 1962 to – 1966?) – new in 1962
  - TB41L – Long hard top bush-drive car – Mercedes-Benz OM-324 engine (September 1962 to July 1968) – new in 1962
  - TB51L – Short pickup with native bed – Mercedes-Benz OM-324 engine (September 1962 to January 1966)
- 1965:
  - TB51L3 – Short 3-door double cabin pickup with native bed and steel bed cover – Mercedes-Benz OM-324 engine (1965 to ?) – new in 1965; possibly only one unit was built
- 1962–1968:
  - OJ32L – Short soft top bush-drive car – Mercedes-Benz OM-324 engine (1966? – to August 1968) – replaces the soft top TB25L
  - OJ31L – Short hard top bush-drive car – Mercedes-Benz OM-324 engine (1966? – to August 1968) – replaces the hard top TB25L
  - TB81L – Short pickup with native bed – Mercedes-Benz OM-324 engine (February 1966 to August 1968) – replaces the TB51L

=== J30 ===
The J30 was only produced for 9 months from February to October 1960. The full model code is FJ35-V (a left hand drive LV also exists). It is built on a J20 chassis with the main difference being a 4-door wagon style body (today known as a SUV) built by Gifu Auto Body Co. The vehicle has an overall length of 4615mm (181.8 in), a wheel base of 2650mm (104.3 in), and sits 5 people. All FJ35s come equipped with the Toyota F engine and a 4 speed manual transmission with selectable 4 four wheel drive. The J40 based wagon is called the FJ45-V/LV and uses the exact same Gifu built body as the J30. It is thought only 60 were built and none are publicly known to have survived.

=== J40 (1960) ===
J40
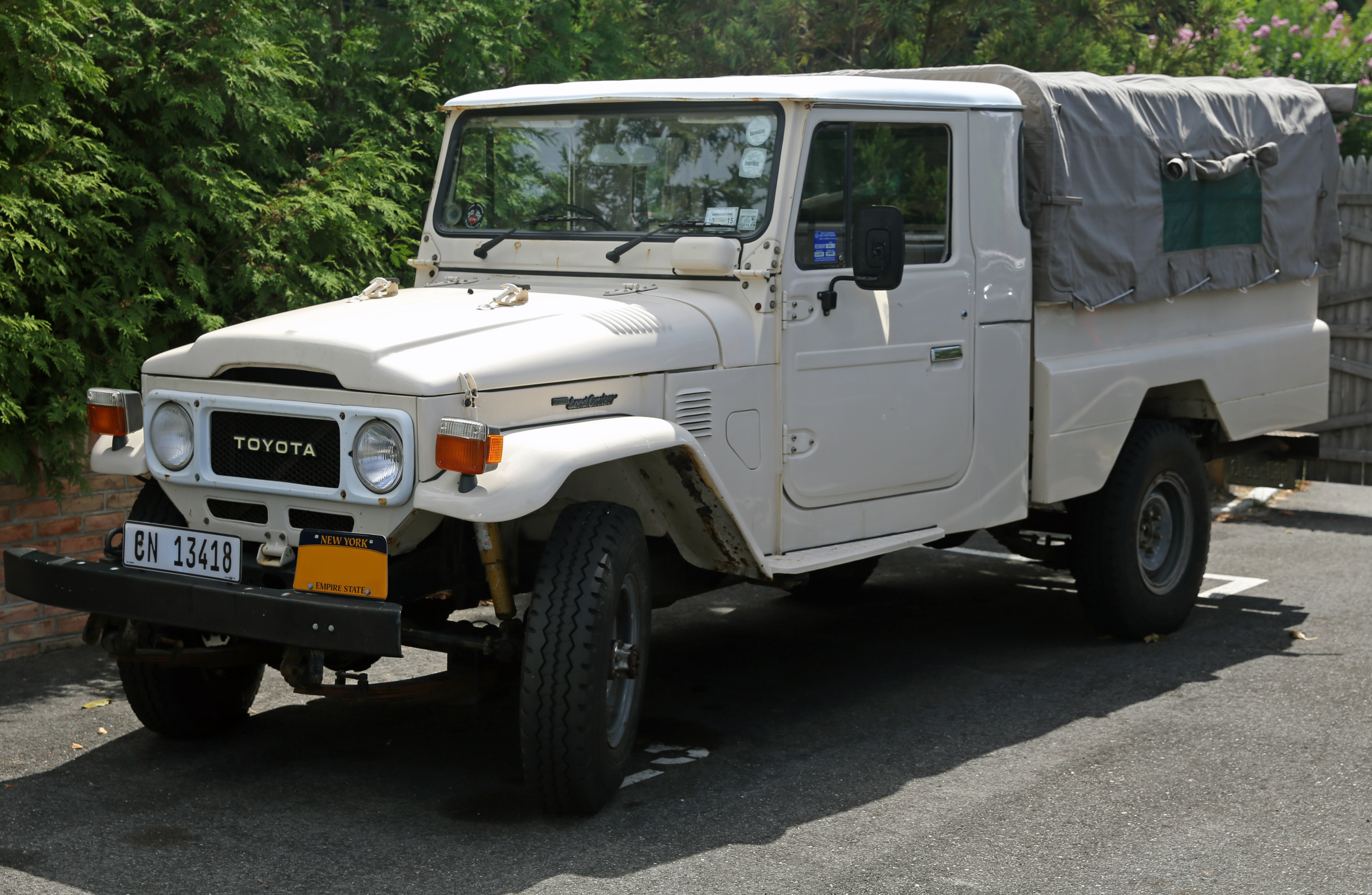

Overview
- Also called: Toyota Bandeirante (Brazil); Toyota Macho (Venezuela)
- Production: 1960–1985; September 1968 – November 2001 (Brazil)
- Assembly: Japan: Toyota City; Brazil: São Bernardo; Venezuela: Cumaná; Indonesia: Jakarta; Malaysia: Sarawak

Body and chassis
- Body style: 2-door softtop; 2-door hardtop; 2-door pickup truck; 4-door station wagon
- Layout: Front-engine, rear-wheel-drive; Front-engine, four-wheel-drive

Powertrain
- Engine: Petrol: 3.9 L F I6; 4.2 L 2F I6; Diesel: 3.0 L B diesel I4; 3.2 L 2B diesel I4; 3.4 L 3B I4; 3.6 L H I6; 3.7 L14B I4 (Bandeirante); 3.8 L Mercedes OM314 I4 (Bandeirante); 4.0 L 2H I6; 4.0 L Mercedes OM364 I4 (Bandeirante)
- Transmission: 3-speed manual; 4-speed manual (from 1974); 5-speed manual (from 1984)

Dimensions
- Wheelbase: 2,285 mm (90.0 in); 2,430 mm (95.7 in); 2,650 mm (104.3 in); 2,950 mm (116.1 in)
- Length: 3,840.5 mm (151.2 in)
- Width: 1,666.2 mm (65.6 in)
- Height: 1,950.7 mm (76.8 in) (softtop); 2,000 mm (78.8 in) (hardtop)
- Curb weight: 1,480 kg (3,263 lb) (softtop); 1,554 kg (3,427 lb) (hardtop)

==== History ====
- 1960 – The 20 Series was upgraded to the now classic 40 Series. Toyota made many production changes by buying new steel presses. Mechanically, the FJ40 was given a new 93 kW (126 PS; 125 hp), 3.9 L F engine and the Land Cruiser finally received low-range gearing, but continued the three-speed main gearbox.
- 1965 – Global production surpassed 50,000 vehicles. The Land Cruiser was the best selling Toyota vehicle in the United States.
- 1968 – The 100,000th Land Cruiser was sold worldwide. Brazilian J40 production, as the Bandeirante, commenced in September. The Bandeirante has a Mercedes-Benz built diesel engine generating a power output of 58 kW (79 PS; 78 hp).
- 1972 – The 200,000th Land Cruiser was sold.
- 1973 – The 300,000th Land Cruiser was sold. The first diesel Land Cruiser was introduced for export based on a long wheelbase with a six-cylinder H engine.
- 1974 – A four-cylinder 3.0 L B diesel engine was offered. The introduction of this engine boosted sales in Japan by putting the Land Cruiser in a lower tax compact freight-car category as compared to the 3.9 L petrol version.

Note: the new B diesel engine was different from the B petrol engine used in the original BJ.

- 1975 – The 3.9 L petrol engine was replaced by a larger, more powerful 4.2 L 2F unit and the FJ55 received front disc brakes. The 3.6 L H diesel engine was optional in some markets in the HJ45.
- 1976 – FJ40 Land Cruiser (United States version) received front disc brakes like the FJ55. The Toyota Land Cruiser Association was founded in California.
- 1977 – The Irish Army took delivery of the first of 77 FJ45 Land Cruisers. Although fast, reliable, and with good off-road performance, the vehicle tended to rust excessively in the wet Irish climate. A few which did not succumb to the effects of weather were repainted in gloss olive green and survive as ceremonial gun tractors at military funerals.
- 1978 – The first BJ/FJ40 and FJ55 models were officially sold in West Germany with both diesel (BJ40) and petrol engines (FJ40/55). Local assembly of the Land Cruiser also started in Malaysia in May 1978.
- 1979 – FJ40 (United States version) was updated this year with a new wider, square bezel surrounding the headlights. Power steering and cooler were offered in FJ40 for the first time. The diesel engine was improved, evolving into the 3.2 L 2B unit but only in Japanese markets.
- 1980 – The H diesel engine (HJ45) was replaced by the 4.0 L 2H engine (now with chassis code HJ47).
- 1981 – The Diesel version received front disc brakes and the more powerful 3.4 L 3B engine, and the LWB BJ45 with 3B engine was added to the range.
- 1982 – 5-speed gearbox introduced.
- 1983 – The last FJ40s imported to the U.S. were 1983 models (mid-1982 to mid-1983). It is unknown how many were imported by Toyota, but many guess the number to be around 300. The 1983 FJ40s typically bring a premium for their rarity, though they are not much different from 1982 models (mid-1981 to mid-1982).
- 1984 – The North American market was limited to Canada with the BJ42, which had a 5-speed (overdrive) transmission that was widely sought. The original cost was around CA$14,000.

==== Gallery ====
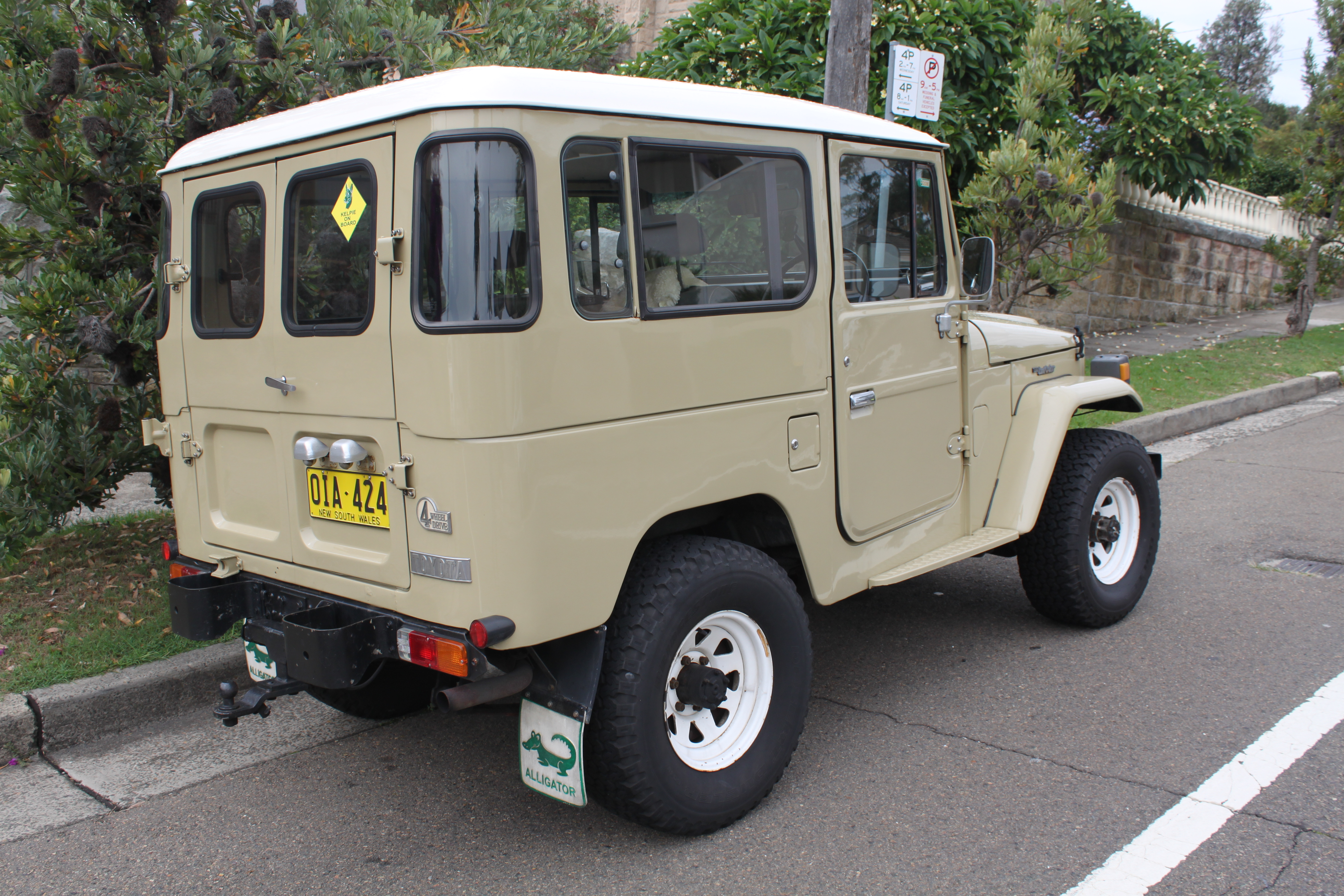
1980 Toyota Land Cruiser hardtop (FJ40)

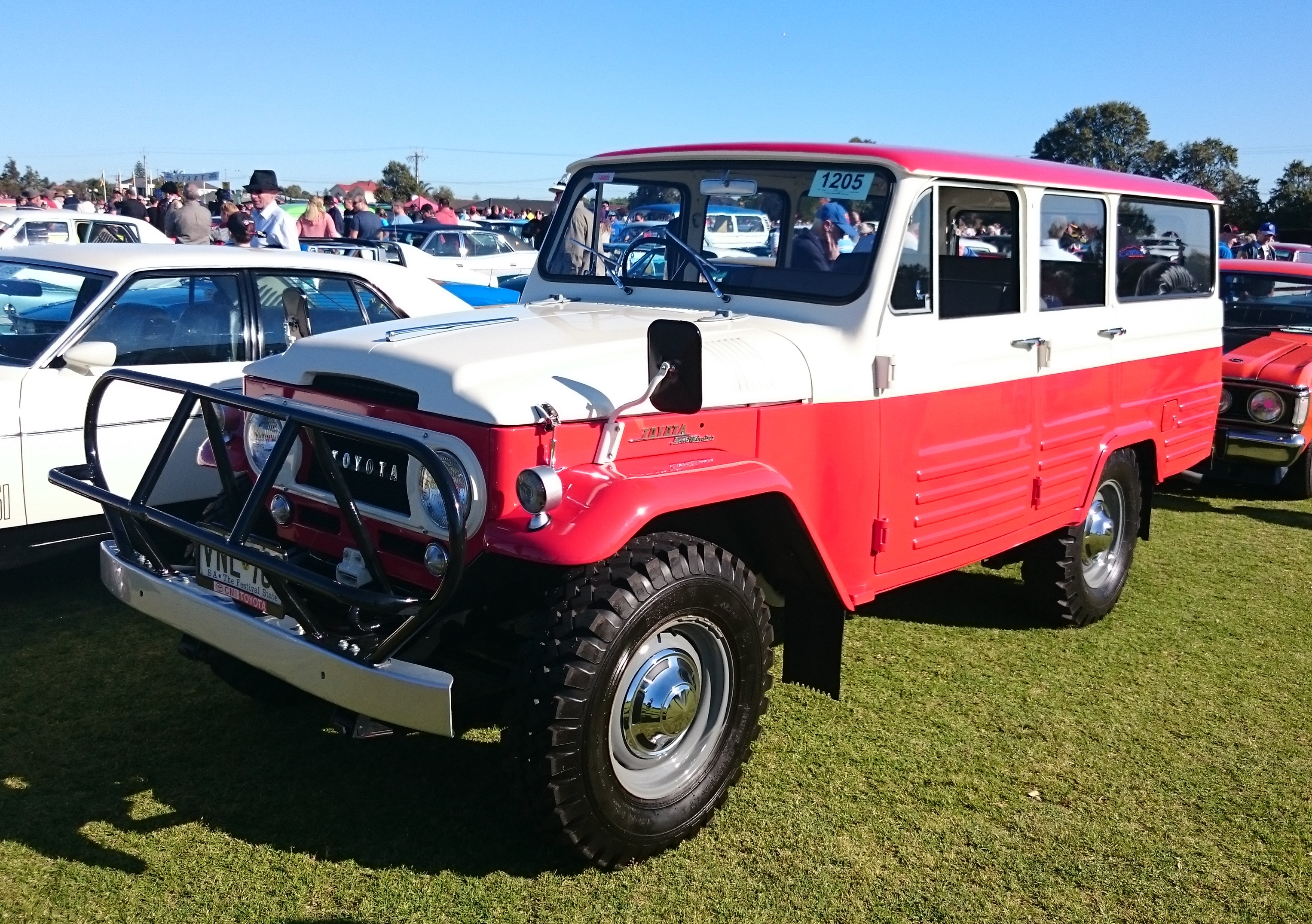
1963 Toyota Land Cruiser Station Wagon (FJ45)

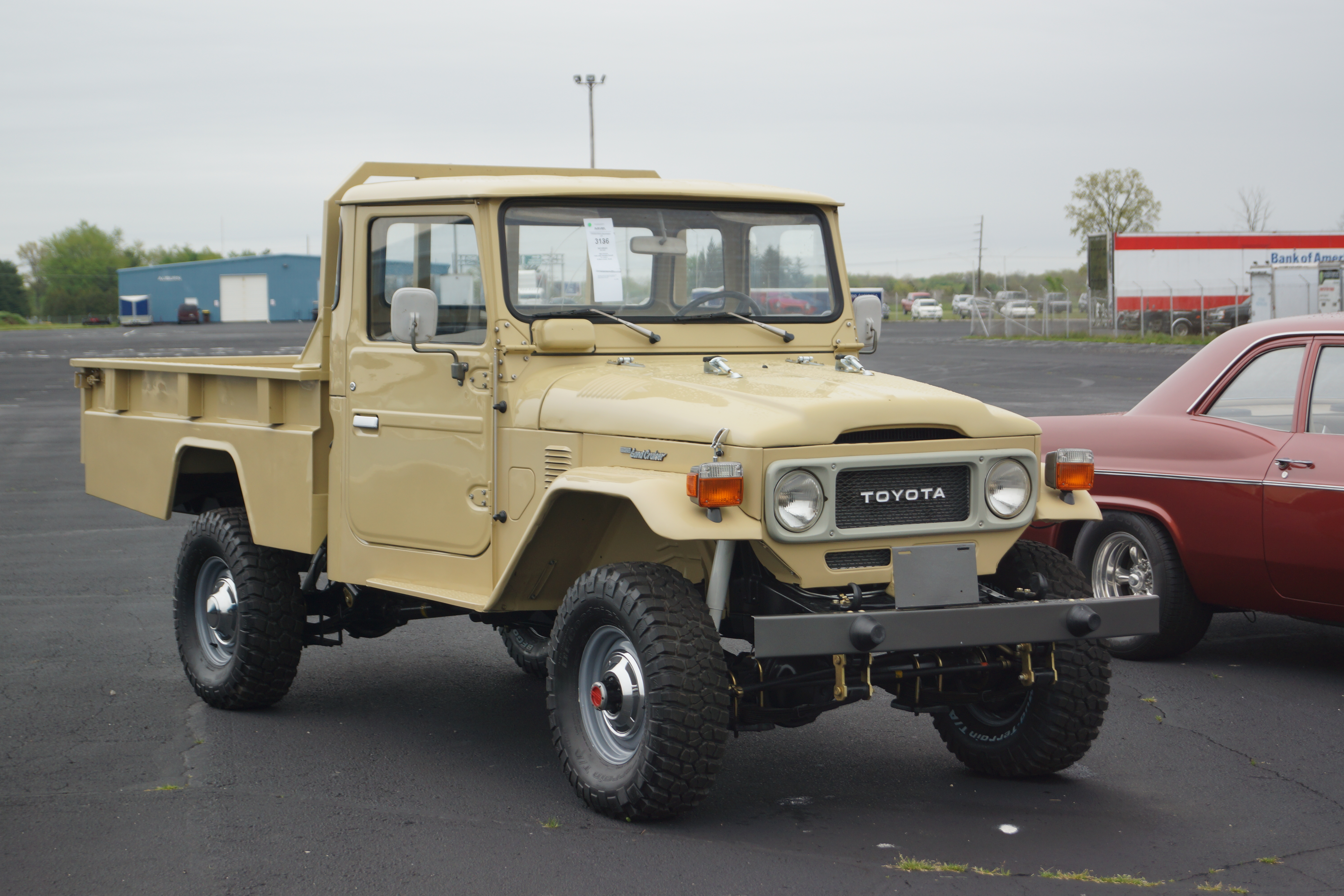
Toyota Land Cruiser pickup (FJ45)

=== J70 (1984) ===
J70
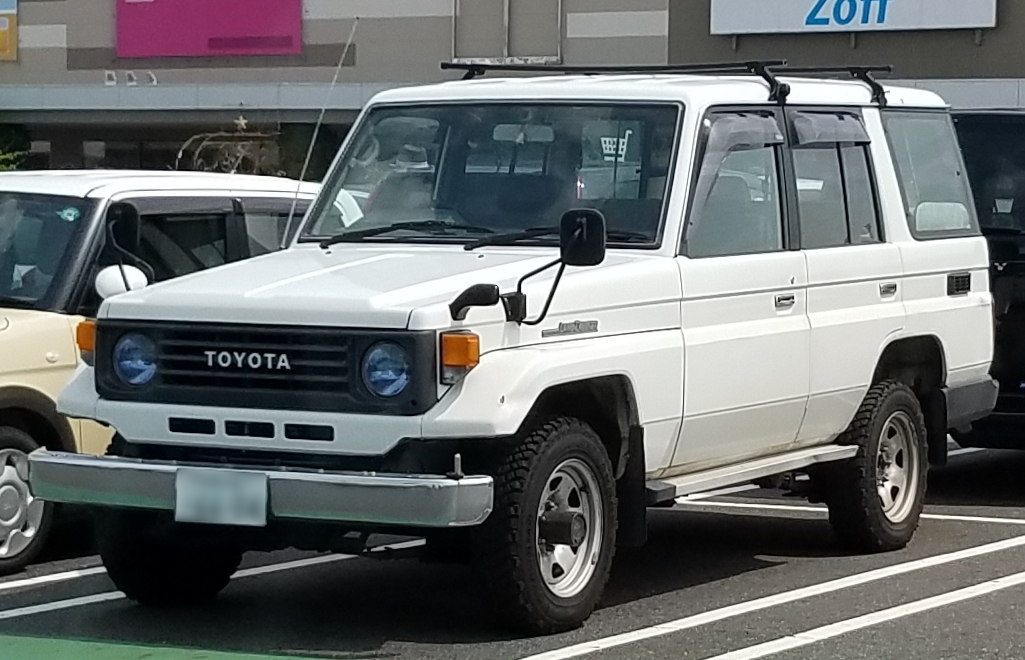

Overview
- Also called: Toyota Machito (Venezuela)
- Production: 1984–present
- Assembly: Japan: Toyota, Aichi (Yoshiwara plant); Colombia: SOFASA, (Envigado, Antioquia, Colombia); Venezuela: Cumaná; Malaysia: Shah Alam, Selangor (ASSB, 1985–1998); Portugal: Ovar

Body and chassis
- Body style: 2-door pickup truck; 4-door pickup truck; 2-door cab chassis; 4-door cab chassis; 2-door hardtop; 2-door softtop; 3-door van; 3-door wagon; 3-door SUV; 5-door SUV
- Layout: Front-engine, four-wheel-drive

Powertrain
- Engine: Petrol: 2.4 L 22R I4; 2.4 L 22R-E I4; 4.0 L 3F I6; 4.5 L 1FZ-F I6; 4.5 L 1FZ-FE I6; 4.0 L 1GR-FE V6; Diesel: 2.4 L 2L I4; 2.4 L 2L-T turbo I4; 2.4 L 2L-TE turbo I4; 2.8 L 3L I4; 2.5 L VM HR425 turbo I4 (Italy only); 2.5 L VM HR588 turbo I5 (Italy only); 2.8 L 1GD-FTV turbo I4 (2023–present); 3.0 L 1KZ-T turbo I4; 3.0 L 1KZ-TE turbo I4; 3.4 L 3B I4; 3.4 L 13B-T turbo I4; 3.4 L 1PZ I5; 3.9 L ADE 236 I4 (South Africa); 4.0 L 2H I6; 4.2 L 1HD-FTE turbo I6; 4.2 L 1HZ I6; 4.5 L 1VD-FTV turbo V8
- Transmission: 5-speed manual; 4-speed automatic; 6-speed automatic (2023–present)

Dimensions
- Wheelbase: 2,310 mm (90.9 in); 2,600 mm (102.4 in); 2,730 mm (107.5 in); 2,980 mm (117.3 in); 3,180 mm (125.2 in)
- Length: Light: 4,060 mm (159.8 in); Regular: 4,870–5,230 mm (191.7–205.9 in)
- Width: Light: 1,690 mm (66.5 in); Regular: 1,790–1,870 mm (70.5–73.6 in)
- Height: Light: 1,895 mm (74.6 in); Regular: 1,940–2,115 mm (76.4–83.3 in)

==== History ====
- 1984 – J70 was introduced as a soft-top, hard-top, Fibre-reinforced plastic top, utility, cab-chassis, and Troop Carrier (inward facing rear seats). The petrol engine was replaced with a 4.0 L 3F engine. The 70 Light had a four-wheel coil spring solid-axle suspension for better ride quality. This lighter-duty version of the Land Cruiser had the 22R 2.4 L four-stroke petrol engine, which actually were the 2L and 2L-T (turbocharged) 2.4 L diesel engines commonly found in the Toyota Hilux. The 70 Light was sold in some markets as the Bundera or the Landcruiser II, later called 70 Prado. The 70 Prado eventually became popular and evolved into the Toyota Land Cruiser Prado (J90). An automatic transmission (A440F) was introduced making it the first four-wheel drive Japanese vehicle with an automatic transmission.
- 1990 – New generation of diesel engines was introduced for the Land Cruiser including a 3.4 L five-cylinder SOHC naturally aspirated engine (1PZ), and a 4.2 L six-cylinder SOHC naturally aspirated engine (designated the 1 HZ).
- 1993 to 1996 – The KZ 3.0 L turbocharged diesel engine replaced the LJ in the 70 series in European markets where this model was known as the KZJ70.
- 1993 – An advanced 24-valve, 4.5 L six-cylinder petrol engine, 1FZ-FE was introduced.
- 1999 – Toyota updated the 70 series in several ways. The solid front axle received coil-spring suspension. The rear leaf springs were lengthened for increased ride comfort and wheel travel. The six-bolt wheels were replaced with five-bolt wheels. Several smaller modifications to the drivetrain provided increased durability. The long-wheel-base models received new designations: 78 for the troop carrier, and 79 for the pickup.
- 2002 – HDJ79 was introduced to Australia with the 1HD-FTE 4.2 L six-cylinder 24-valve turbo-diesel EFI engine.
- 2007 – Toyota's first turbo-diesel V8 engine, the 1VD-FTV was introduced in some countries for the 70 Series Land Cruiser. Other modifications include the addition of a 4-door medium-wheel-base model (the 76) and an updated front-end on all models.
- 2012 – The 79 Double Cab pickup was introduced in the South African markets (with the 4.2 L diesel or 4.0 L petrol engines) and in the Australian market (with 4.5 L V8 Diesel engine).
- 2014 to 2015 – The 30th Anniversary Series 70 sold in Japan as a 4-door wagon or 4-door pickup with the 1GR-FE V6 petrol engine and 5-speed manual transmission.
- 2023 70 Series is re-introduced to Japan. Sold with the 1GD 4 cylinder turbo diesel engine in similar configurations as before, including 4-door wagon, 2-door pickup, 4-door pickup, and 3-door troop carrier models.

The Sixth and Seventh generations of the Land Cruiser are still being produced and sold in African and Latin American regions. Production of the Land Cruiser in Venezuela ended in 2008.

The 70 series is also still marketed in Australia as 4-door wagon, 2-door 'Troop Carrier', 2-door cab-chassis and 4-door cab-chassis.

The 70 series is also still being marketed in the Middle East as a 2-door and 4-door version as an SUV, and a 2-door and 4-door version as a pickup, and it is very popular there along with the regular Land Cruiser.

==== Gallery ====
South African spec J70

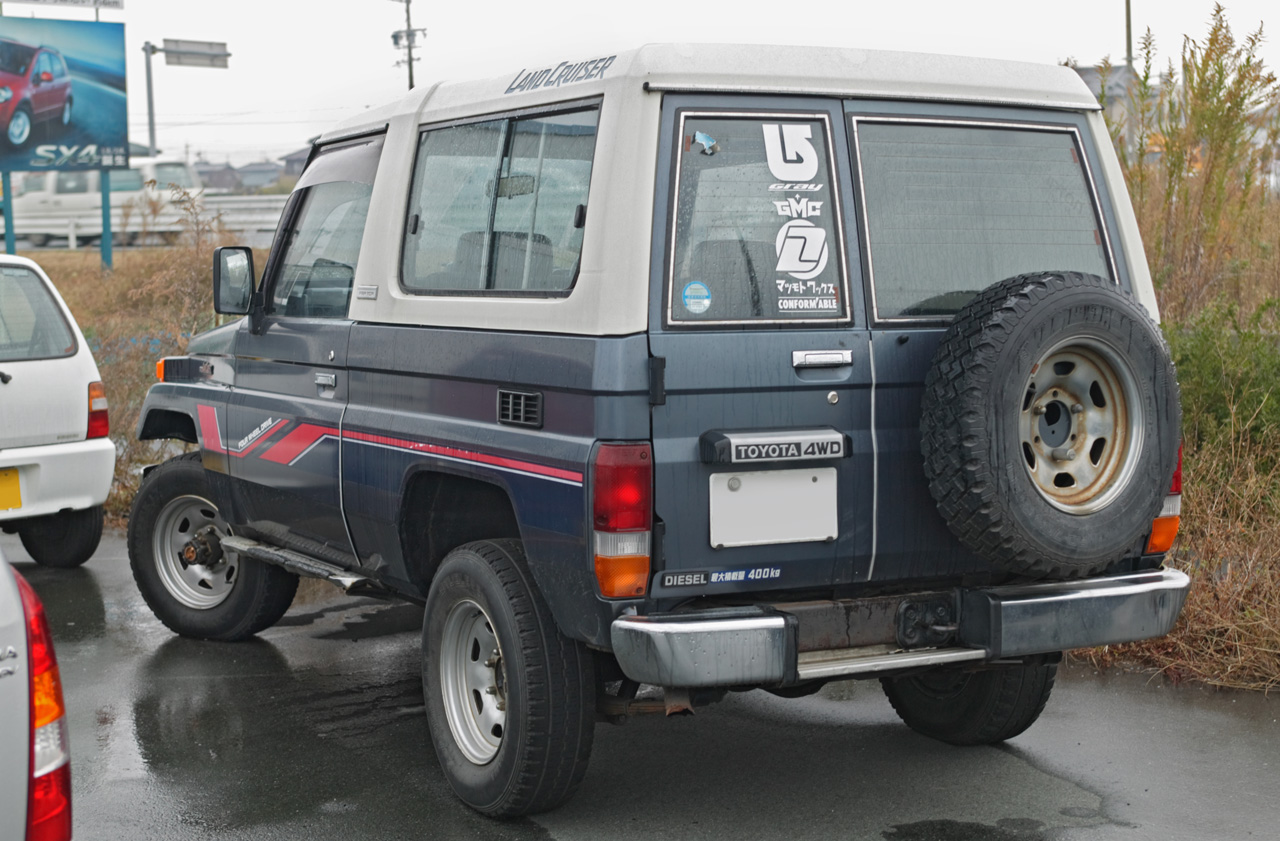
BJ74 Mid wheelbase FRP-top 3.4D-T LX

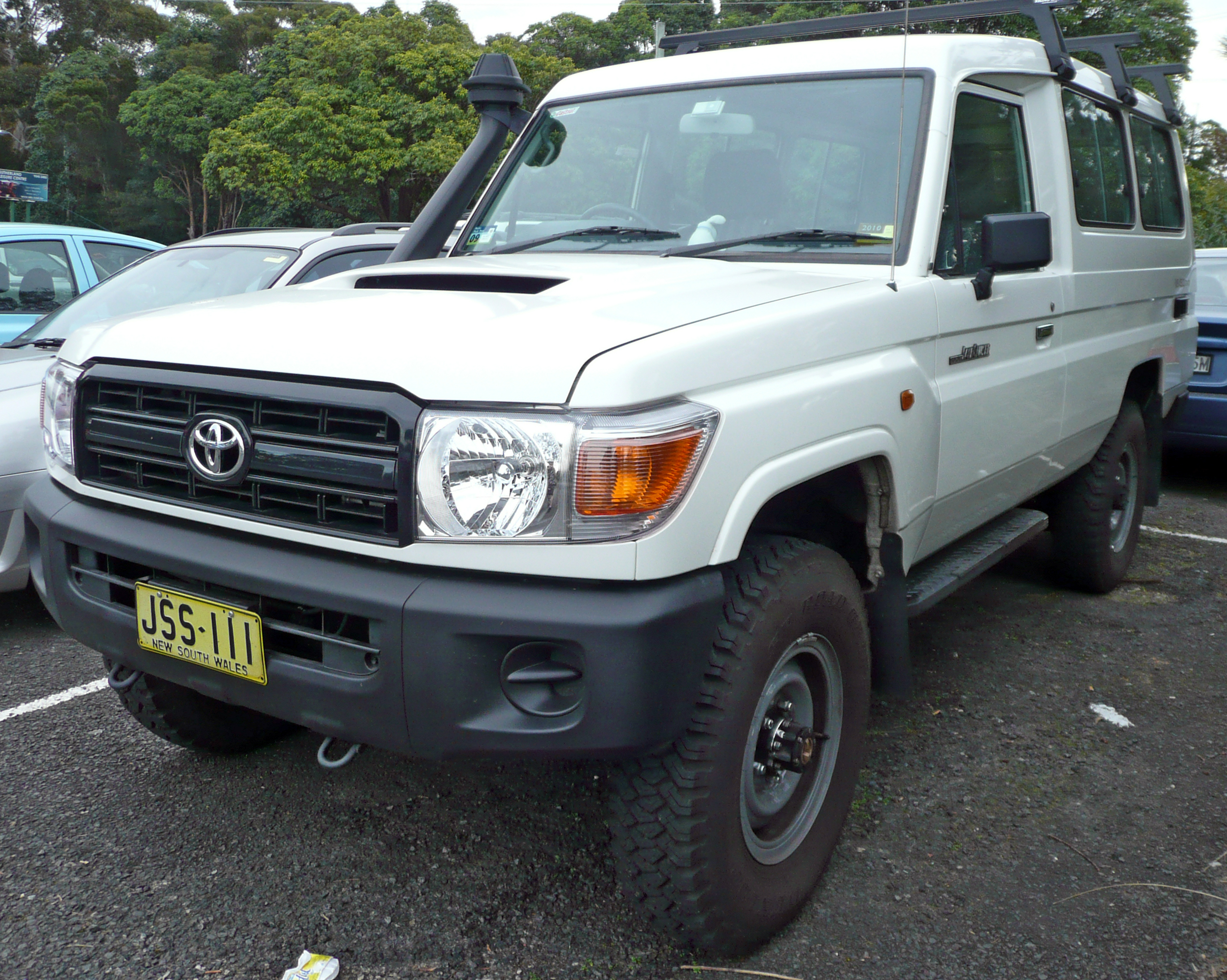
VDJ78 Troop Carrier

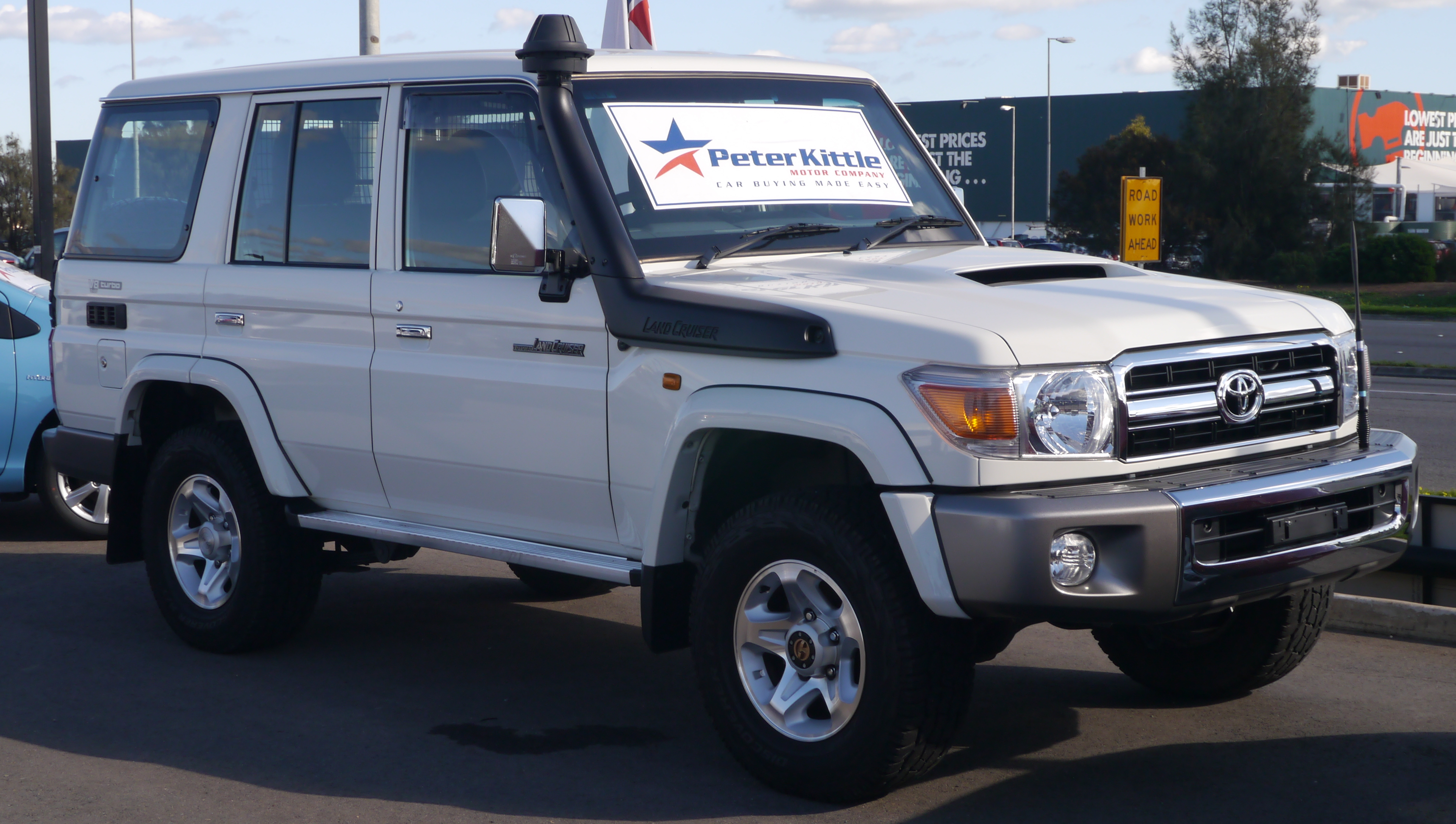
VDJ76 GXL 5-door wagon

== Station Wagon series ==
=== J50 (1967) ===
J50
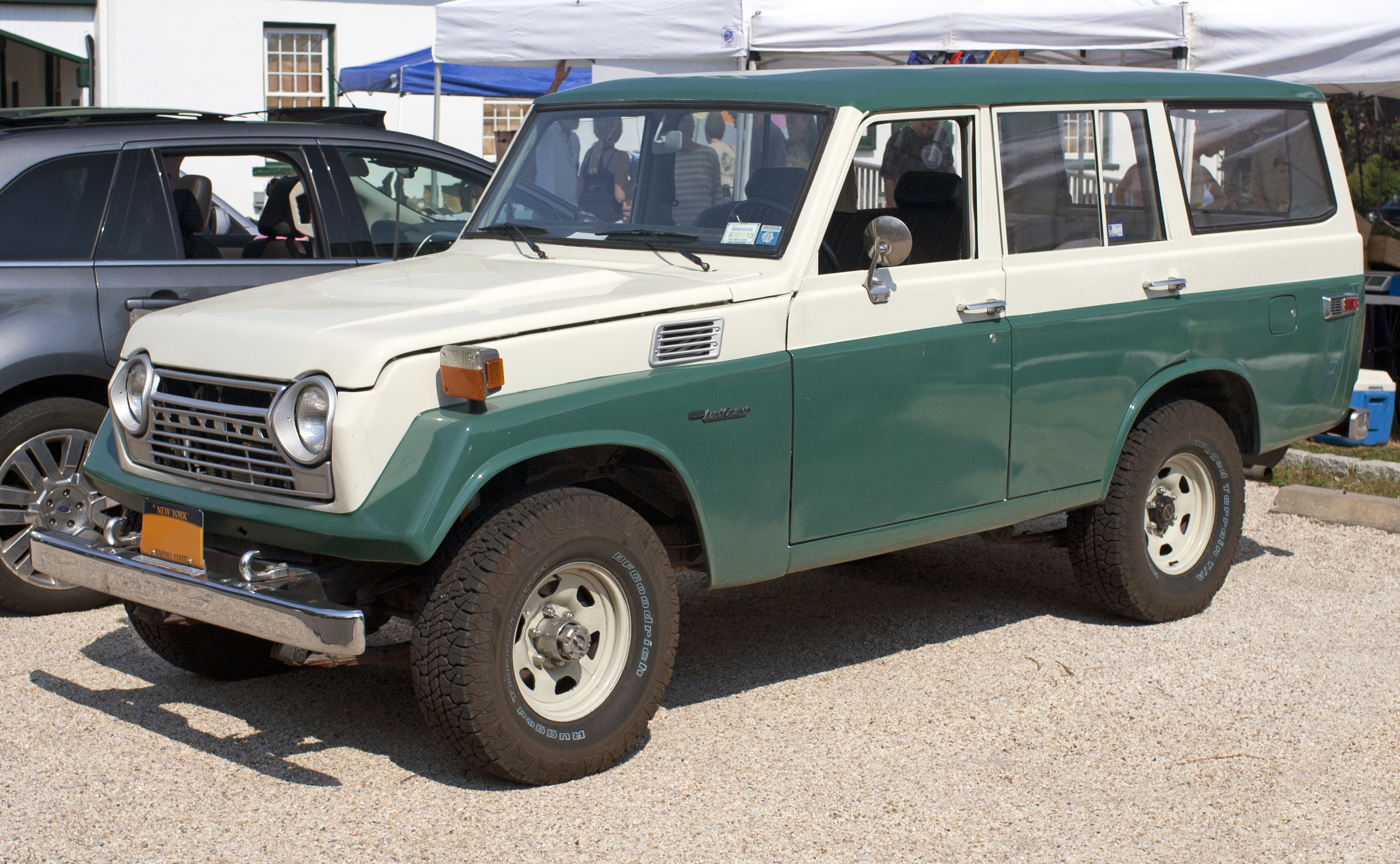
- 1979 FJ55 (US)

Overview
- Production: 1967–1980
- Assembly: Japan: Toyota City (ARACO)

Body and chassis
- Body style: 5-door SUV
- Layout: Front-engine, four-wheel-drive

Powertrain
- Engine: 3.9 L F I6; 4.2 L 2F I6
- Transmission: 3-speed manual; 4-speed manual (J30, H41 or H42)

Dimensions
- Wheelbase: 2,700 mm (106.3 in)
- Length: 4,675 mm (184.1 in)
- Width: 1,735 mm (68.3 in)
- Height: 1,865 mm (73.4 in)

The Land Cruiser 55 was produced from 1967 to 1980. Toyota refers to the FJ55G and FJ55V as the first "real" station wagon (now known as a sport utility vehicle) in the Land Cruiser series, thus marking the beginning of the station wagon body style. It was the first Land Cruiser to have fully enclosed box frame members. Of all the Land Cruiser wagons sold in the U.S., including the FJ45, it is the only one to not have hatch and tailgate in the rear, but rather a tailgate only with an electrically operated window that can be retracted into the tailgate.

==== History ====
- 1967 – Production of the FJ55 began. The FJ55 was a 4-door station wagon version based on the FJ40's Drive-train, replacing the 4-Door FJ45V (I). It was colloquially known as the "Moose". It has also been referred to as a "pig" or an "iron pig". The FJ55 had a longer wheelbase (at 2,700 mm (106 in)) and was mainly designed to be sold in North America and Australia. Fire engine versions were also available, using the regular front clip but with open bodywork and no doors.
- 1975 – January 1975 saw the F series engine being replaced by the 2F engine. Unusual for Toyota, the model designation (e.g. FJ55) did not change, except in Japan, where it was changed to FJ56.
- July 1980 – Production ends.

==== Gallery ====
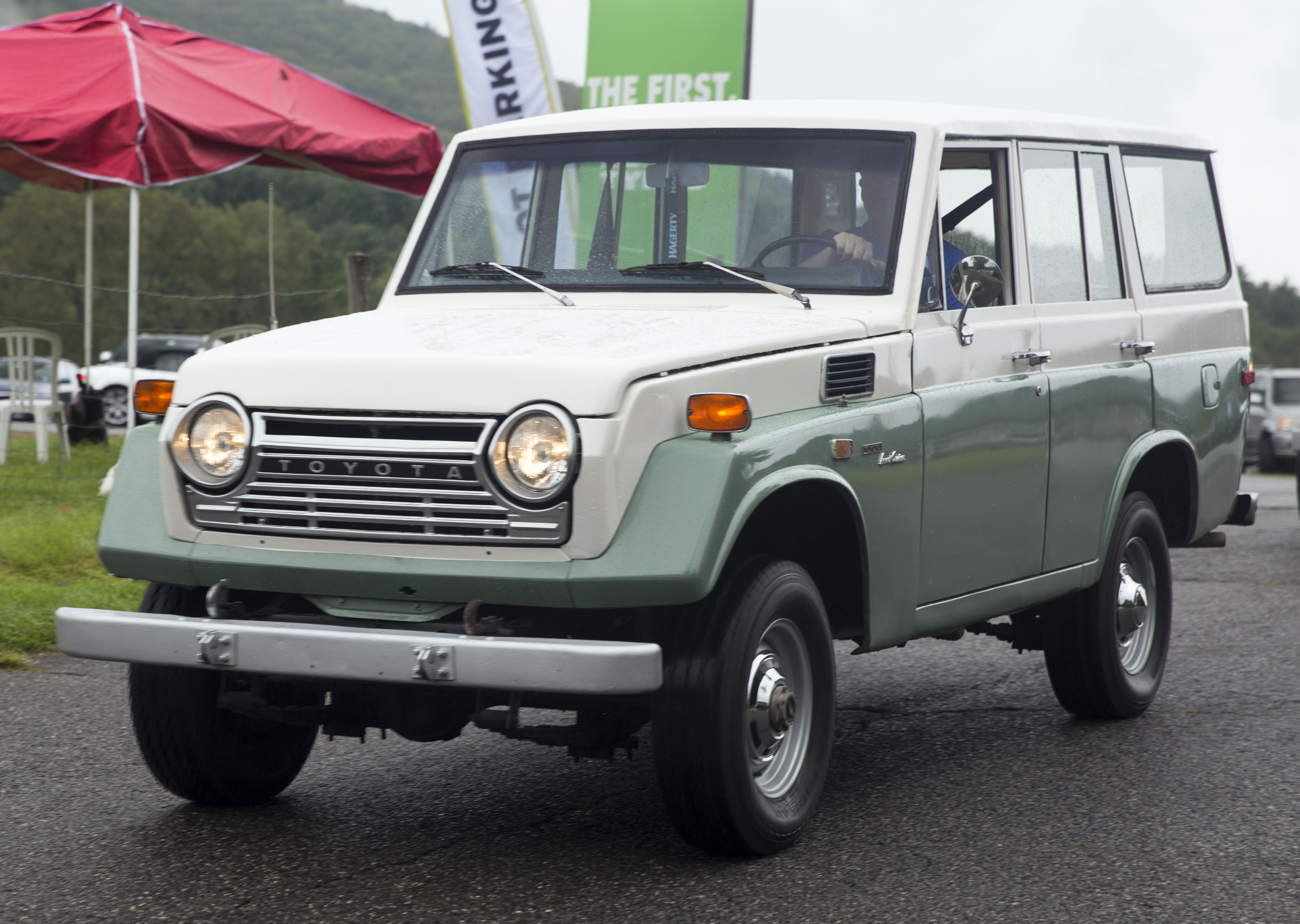
Front view

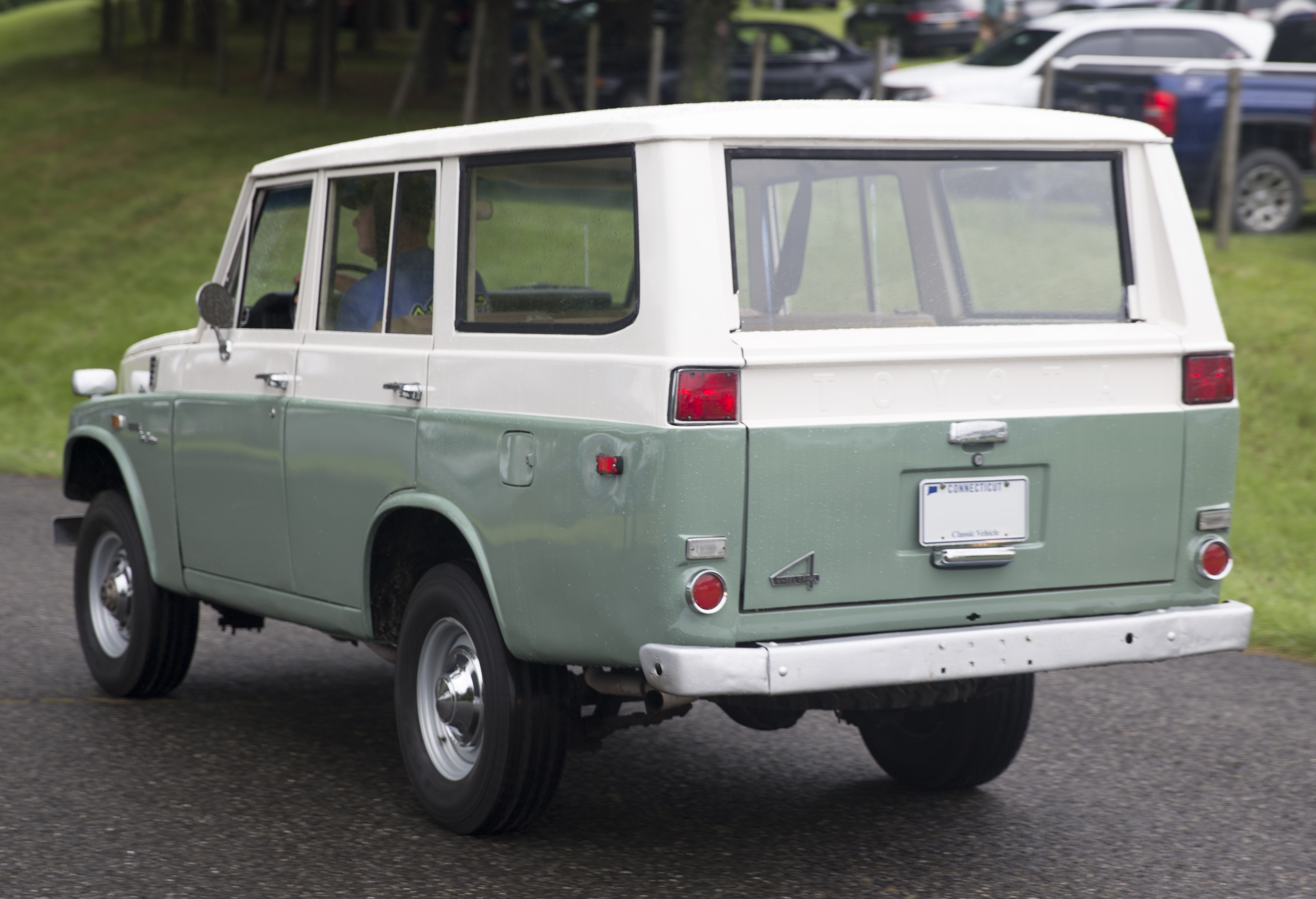
Rear view

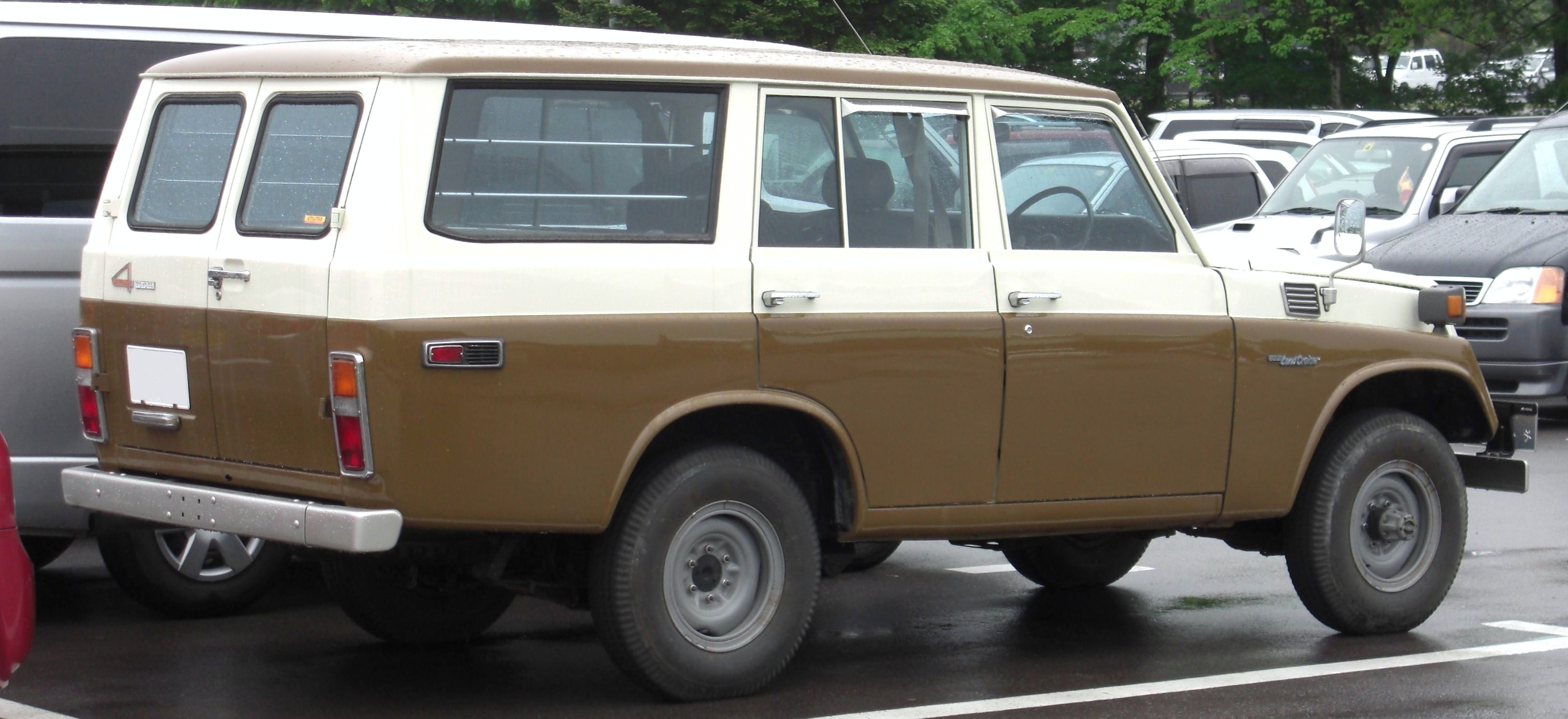
1975 Land Cruiser FJ56V (Japan)

=== J60 (1980) ===
J60
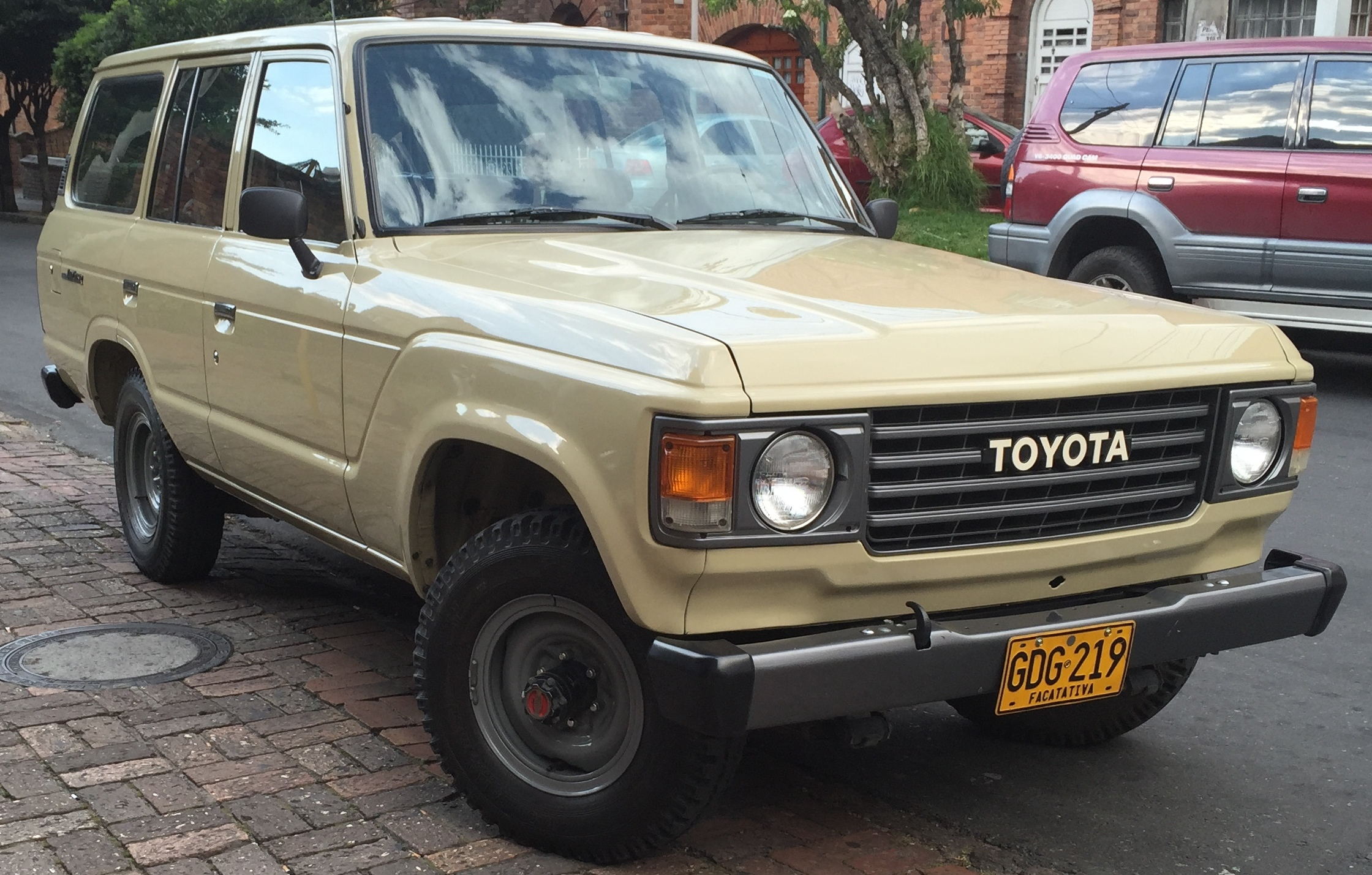

Overview
- Also called: Toyota Samurai (Venezuela)
- Production: 1980–1992
- Assembly: Japan: Toyota City (ARACO); Venezuela: Cumaná; Malaysia: Shah Alam, Selangor (ASSB)

Body and chassis
- Body style: 5-door SUV
- Layout: Front-engine, four-wheel-drive

Powertrain
- Engine: Petrol: 4.2 L 2F I6 (FJ60)(1980 - 1987); 4.0 L 3F I6 (FJ61)(1984 - 1988); 4.0 L 3F-E I6 (FJ62)(1988 - 1992); Diesel: 3.4 L 3B I4 (BJ60)(1980 - 1986); 4.0 L 2H I6 (HJ60)(1982 - 1990); 4.0 L 12H-T turbo I6 (HJ61)(1985 - 1990)
- Transmission: 4-speed H41F or H42F manual (United States only); 4-speed A440F automatic; 5-speed H55F manual

Dimensions
- Wheelbase: 2,730 mm (107.5 in)
- Length: 4,750 mm (187.0 in)
- Width: 1,800 mm (70.9 in)
- Height: 1,750 mm (68.9 in) (low roof); 1,950 mm (76.8 in) (high roof)

The Land Cruiser 60 series was produced from 1980 through 1990, for most markets but the Cumana Plant in Venezuela continued production until 1992 for their local market. It is a front engine, four-door wagon which can seat five to eight people. The 60 series was available in the following exterior colours: Alpine White, Brown, Desert Beige, Freeborn Red, Royal Blue; and in the following metallic exterior colours: Charcoal Gray, Cognac, Gray-Blue, Rootbeer, Sky Blue, Stardust Silver.

==== History ====
- 1980 – The 60 series was introduced. While still retaining the rugged off-road characteristics of previous Land Cruisers, the 60 was designed to better compete in the emerging sport utility vehicle market. The 60 was given a variety of creature comforts like air conditioning, a rear heater and an upgraded interior. The FJ60's "2F" petrol engine was left unchanged from the "40" series while the six-cylinder 4.0 L 2H and the four-cylinder 3.4 L 3B diesel engines were added to the lineage. Less equipped versions were also available in many markets. In Europe this model was sold as the Land Cruiser Wagon Van.
- 1981 – Land Cruiser sales surpassed 1 million and a high-roof version was introduced. The 60 series was introduced to South Africa when a stock Land Cruiser competed in the Toyota 1000 km Desert Race in the punishing wilds of Botswana.
- 1982 – 5-speed gearbox introduced.
- 1984 – This was the final year for the 40 series.
- 1984 – Alongside the 60 series, the 70 series was introduced.
- 1984 – The petrol engine was upgraded to the 4.0 L 3F (carburettor) in all markets but North America, which kept the 2F until the release of the 3F-E (injection) in 1987.
- 1985 – The direct-injection 12H-T turbo-diesel engine was introduced.
- 1987 – The petrol engine 4.0 L 3F-E EFI was introduced alongside the 4.0 L 3F carburettor engine. The FJ62G VX-Series was introduced, allowing the Land Cruiser to be sold in Japan as a passenger vehicle. In US-specs, the 3F-E produces 155 hp (116 kW).
- 1992 – Last FJ62 with a 4.0 L 3F carburettor engine was built in Venezuela which was the only country producing the vehicles after production ended in Japan in 1990.

==== Gallery ====
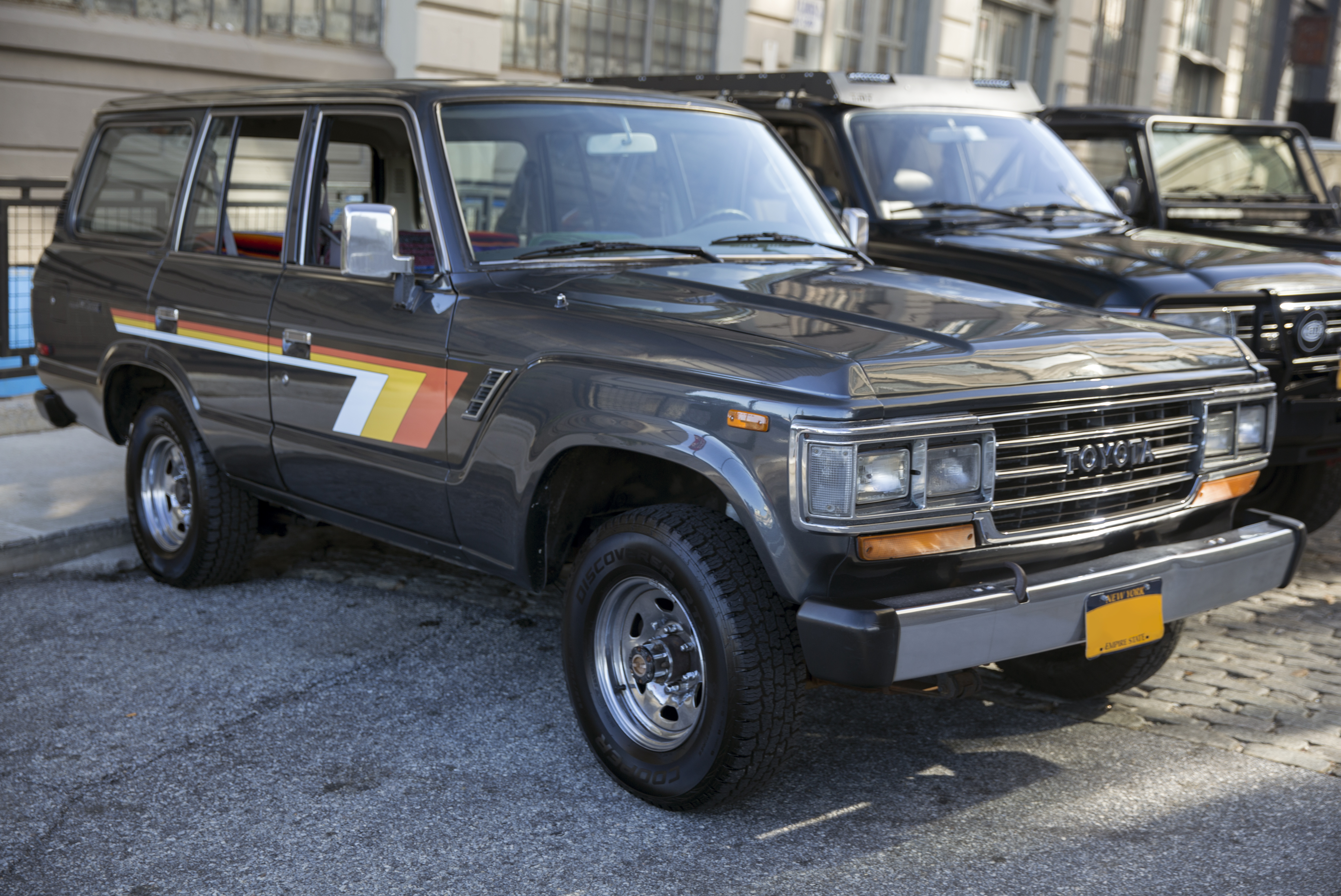
Land Cruiser post-facelift

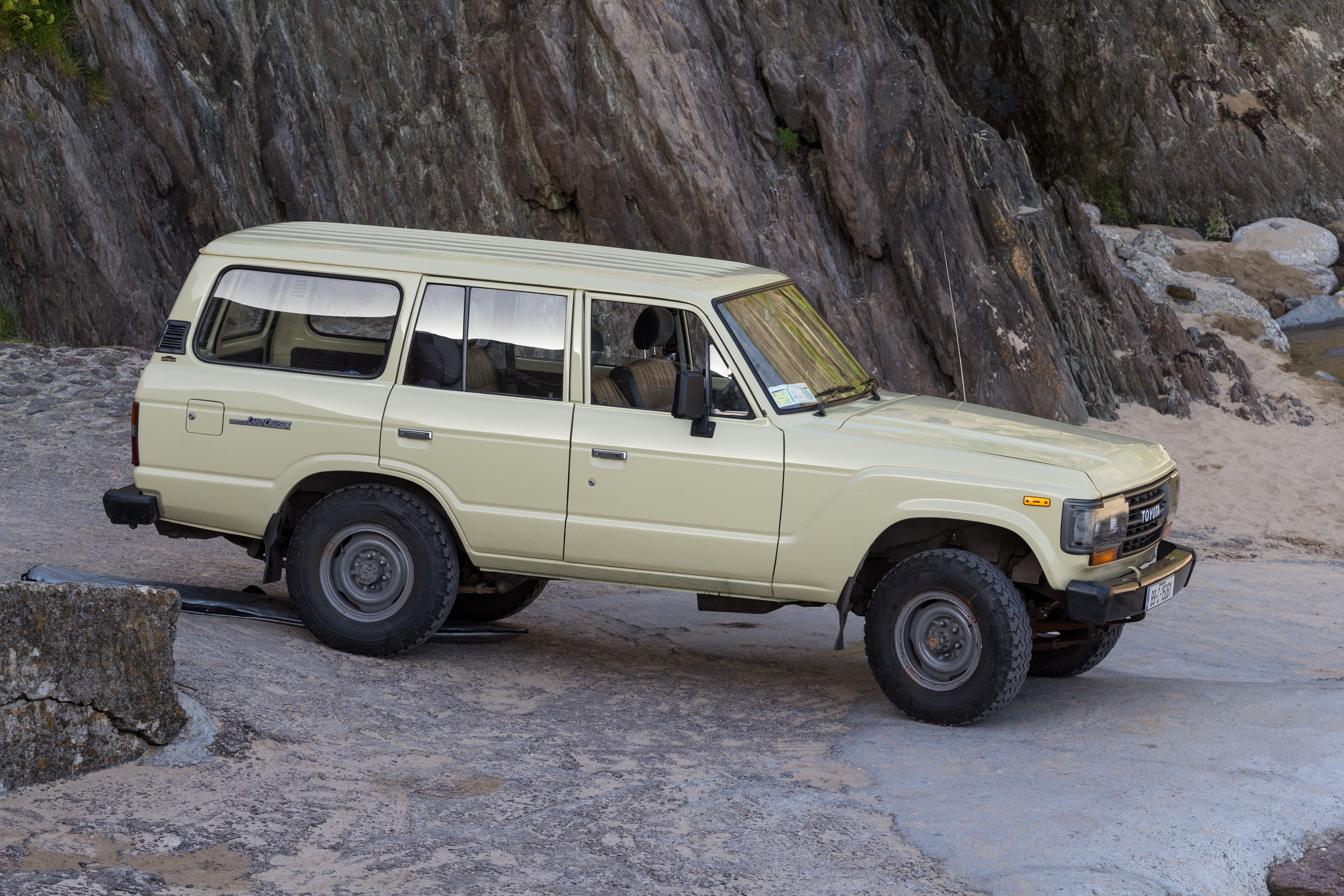
Land Cruiser (J60; Ireland)

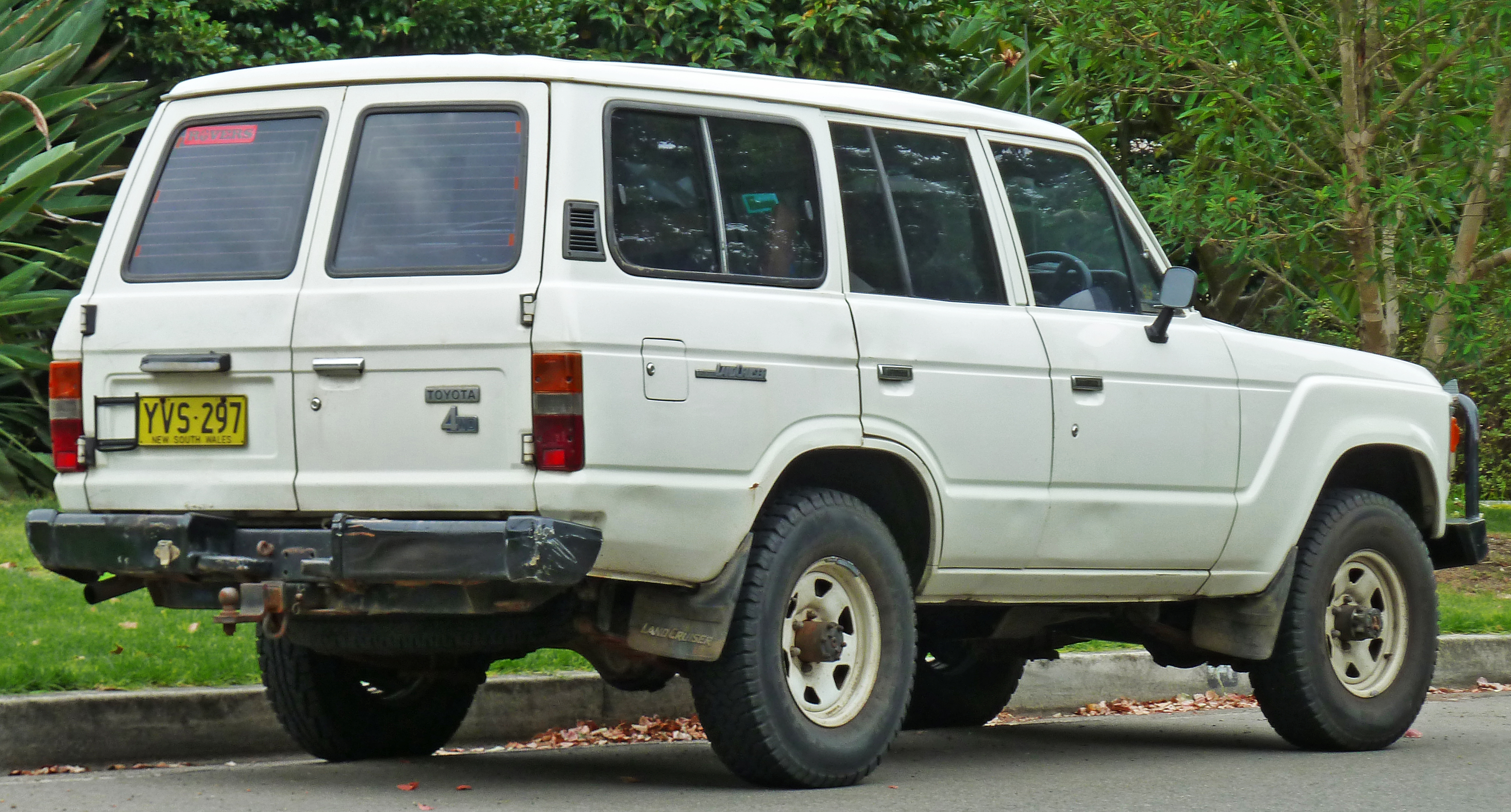
Land Cruiser (FJ60; pre-facelift, rear view)

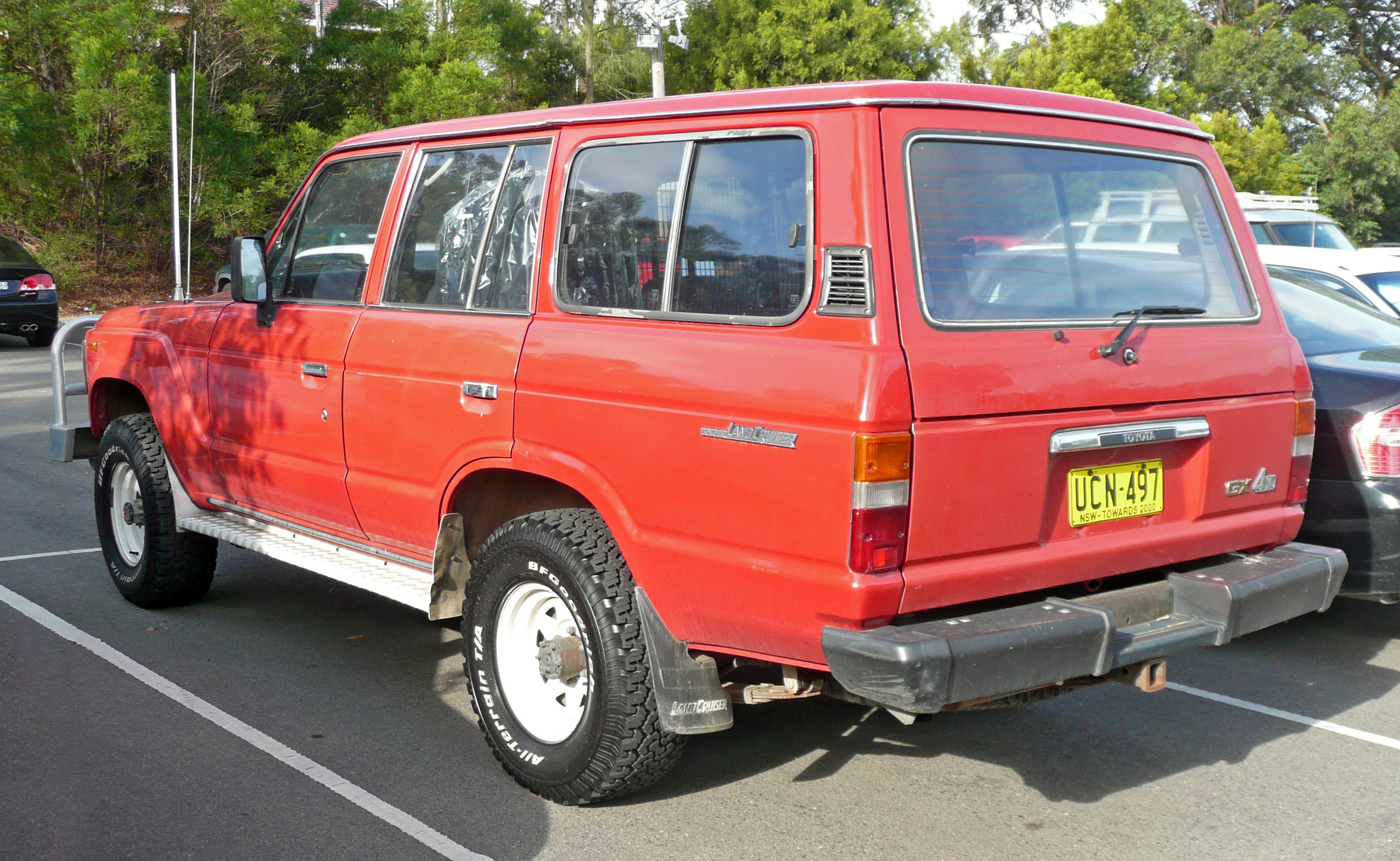
Land Cruiser GX (FJ62; post-facelift, rear view)

=== J80 (1990) ===
J80
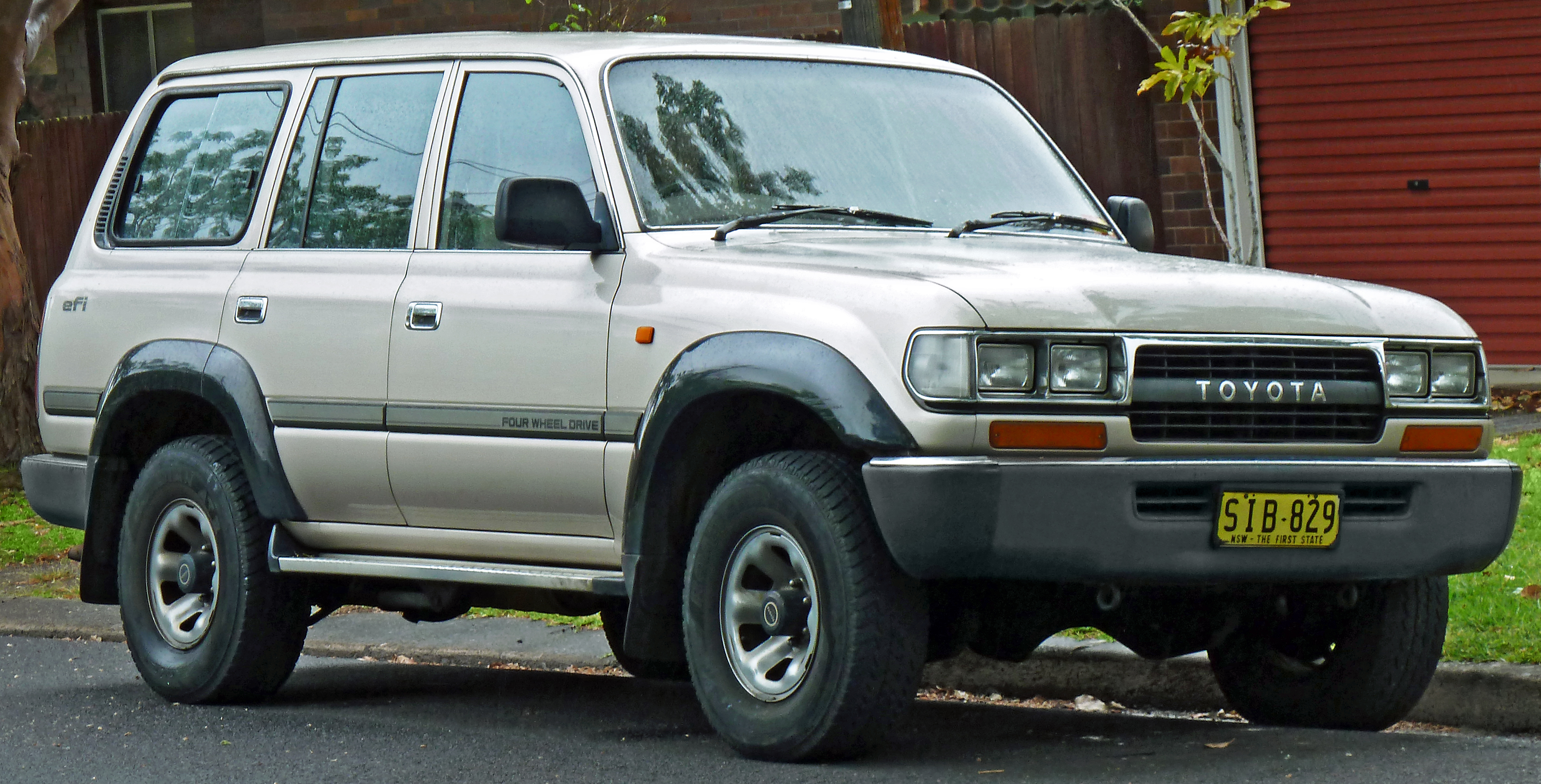

Overview
- Also called: Lexus LX 450; Toyota Land Cruiser Autana (Venezuela); Wanli Land Cruiser (China, JV); Xinkai HXK5022XSC (China, JV); Toyota Land Cruiser Amazon (UK, 1997); Beijing Zhonglian WL6460
- Production: January 1990–2007
- Assembly: Japan: Toyota City (ARACO); Venezuela: Cumaná; China: Zhanjiang, Guangdong (Xinkai); Indonesia: North Jakarta (Multi Astra); Malaysia: Shah Alam, Selangor (ASSB)
- Designer: Kitano Kizo (1987)

Body and chassis
- Body style: 5-door SUV
- Layout: Front-engine, four-wheel-drive

Powertrain
- Engine: Petrol: 4.0 L 3F I6; 4.0 L 3F-E I6; 4.5 L 1FZ-FE I6; Diesel: 4.2 L 1HZ I6; 4.2 L 1HD-T turbocharged I6; 4.2 L 1HD-FT turbocharged I6
- Transmission: 5-speed H150F manual; 5-speed H151F manual; 4-speed A440F automatic; 4-speed A442F automatic; 4-speed A343F automatic

Dimensions
- Wheelbase: 2,850 mm (112.2 in)
- Length: 4,780 mm (188.2 in) (1990–1994); 4,820 mm (189.8 in) (1995–1997)
- Width: 1,830 mm (72.0 in) (1990–1991); 1,930 mm (76.0 in) (1992–1997)
- Height: 1,785 mm (70.3 in) (1990–1991); 1,860 mm (73.2 in) (1992–1994); 1,870 mm (73.6 in) (1995–1997)
- Curb weight: 2,084 kg (4,594 lb) (1990–1992); 2,159 kg (4,760 lb) (1993–1997)

The Land Cruiser 80 series was unveiled in October 1989 at the Tokyo Motor Show and launched in early 1990. It was offered with a choice of swing-out back doors or a lift-up tailgate. The Land Cruiser was nicknamed the Burbuja (Bubble) in Colombia and Venezuela due to its roundness. The J80 was initially offered in two versions in these countries: the fully loaded VX and an entry-level model that included a vinyl interior with optional air conditioning. The Land Cruiser was also nicknamed Ninja King in parts of Malaysia. In 1996, the entry model was upgraded to a medium-equipped model named Autana, including cloth upholstery, standard air conditioning and power driver seat. The name is a reference to the Tepui mesa Autana, a spectacular plateau and cave system along the Guiana Shield craton. Land Cruiser sales reached 2 million vehicles.

==== History ====
- 1990 – The 80 series station wagon was introduced, replacing the 60 series. All 80s sold in North America and Europe now have a full-time four-wheel drive system. In Japan, Africa, and Australia, a part-time system was still available. 80s produced between 1990 and 1991 had an open centre differential which was lockable in 4HI and automatically locked in 4LO. From 1992 onward, vehicles with anti-lock brakes had a viscous coupling that sent a maximum of 30% torque to the non-slipping axle. The differential was lockable in 4HI and automatically locked in 4LO.
- 1990 – A new generation of diesel engines was introduced, adding to the engines available in the 80 series. The 80 series came with either a (3F-E) six-cylinder naturally aspirated petrol engine, a six-cylinder SOHC naturally aspirated diesel engine, (1HZ), or a 1HD-T direct injection turbo diesel.
- 1991 – By mid-1991, the 3F-E engine was introduced to the Australian market, a fuel injected version of the 3F engine.
- 1993 – An advanced 24-valve, 4.5 L six-cylinder petrol engine, 1FZ-FE was introduced. Larger brakes were added from October 1992 and the total wheelbase was made slightly longer. Front and rear axle lockers (code k294) were available as an option. The High Pinion Electric Locking front differential became available in the US models. In May 1993, Toyota began using R134 refrigerant in the air conditioning system. Serial numbers lower than JT3DJ81xxxxx38947 use the R12 refrigerant.
- 1994 – A limited edition called the Land Cruiser Blue Marlin (FZJ80) was introduced to the Australian market. They have 4.5 L straight-6 petrol engines with double-overhead cams, an automatic or manual transmission and 158 kW (215 PS; 212 hp) at 4,600 rpm. The car is blue from the Blue Marlin fish and they have the Blue Marlin logo throughout the car. Some of the features that the Blue Marlin included were altimeters, power windows, disc brakes, leather gear knob and steering wheel, central locking, leather trim, chrome handles and sidesteps, 16-inch alloy wheels, limited-slip differential, anti-lock brakes (ABS), power steering, CD or cassette players, fender flares, and a limited edition bull bar. Only 500 were made.
- 1995 – Driver and passenger airbags were introduced as were adjustable shoulder-belt anchors and an anti-lock braking system. The "T O Y O T A" badge was replaced with the modern, ovoid Toyota logo.
- 1996 – In the Dakar Rally, a pair of Land Cruisers finished first and second in the unmodified production class. North American and British models adopted anti-lock brakes and airbags as standard equipment. The Land Cruiser was withdrawn from Canada this year and from then on would only be sold in said market as the Lexus LX.
- 1997 – A limited run of Land Cruiser 80 was built specifically for collectors and is therefore called the Land Cruiser Collector's Edition. The Collector's Edition has Collector's Edition badging, "Collector's Edition" embroidered floor mats, automatic climate control, wheels with the "D" windows painted dark grey and special grey side mouldings along with black pearl badging. The Collector's Edition was only available for the 1997 model year and the package was added to many of the available body colours.
- 1997 – A total of 4,744 FZJ80 Land Cruisers were sold in the United States as "40th Anniversary Limited Edition" models. They were available in 2 colours; Antique Sage Pearl (often referred to as Riverrock, Pewter, or Grey) and Emerald Green. The 40th Anniversary models included apron badges, a serial number badge on the centre console, black pearl exterior badges, "40th Anniversary Limited Edition" embroidered floor mats, automatic climate control, two-tone tan and brown leather interiors, and wheels with the "D" windows painted dark gray. Many were manufactured with the optional electric front and rear locking differentials, keyless entry, port-installed roof racks and running boards. There are some examples that did not have many of these optional extras. This was the last year for the electric locking front differentials. For UK and Irish markets, to avoid confusion with the Land Cruiser Prado being introduced, the full size Land Cruiser would be renamed Land Cruiser Amazon with the Prado being named the Land Cruiser Colorado.
- 2007 – Last 80-Series models were built in Venezuela which was the only country producing the vehicles after production ended in Japan in 1997.

==== Engines ====
| Designation | Engine | Power | Torque | Availability |
|---|---|---|---|---|
| FJ80R/L | 3F-E 4.0 L petrol I6 | 112 kW (152 PS; 150 hp) at 4,000 rpm | 290 N⋅m (214 lb⋅ft) at 3,000 rpm | Australia, North America, Middle East |
| FZJ80 | 1FZ-F 4.5 L petrol I6 | 140 kW (190 PS; 188 hp) at 4,400 rpm | 363 N⋅m (268 lb⋅ft) at 3,200 rpm | Venezuela, Colombia, Bolivia (1994–1998), Middle East |
| FZJ80R/L | 1FZ-FE 4.5 L petrol I6 | 158 kW (215 PS; 212 hp) at 4,600 rpm | 373 N⋅m (275 lb⋅ft) at 3,200 rpm | Australia, Middle East, Europe, North Africa, North America until 1997 and Venezuela, Colombia, Bolivia (1998–2007) |
| HDJ80R | 1HD-T 4.2 L turbo-diesel I6 | 115 kW (156 PS; 154 hp) at 3,600 rpm | 357 N⋅m (263 lb⋅ft) at 1,800 rpm | Australia, Japan, Europe |
| HZJ80R/L | 1HZ 4.2 L diesel I6 | 96 kW (131 PS; 129 hp) at 4,000 rpm | 271 N⋅m (200 lb⋅ft) at 2,000 rpm | Australia, Japan, Middle East |

R means Right-hand drive version, excluding the Japanese market.

==== Gallery ====
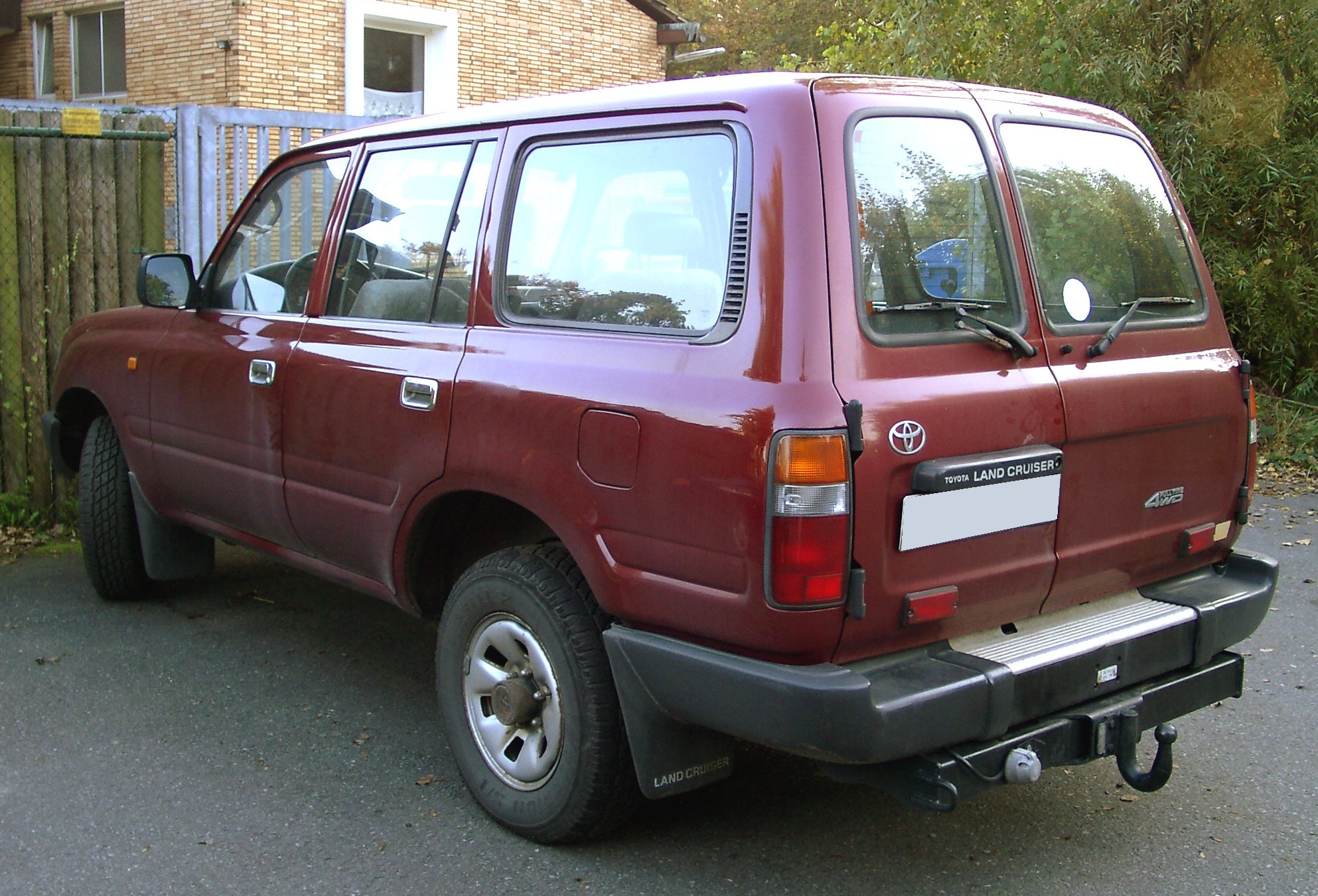
Land Cruiser (with swing-out back-doors)

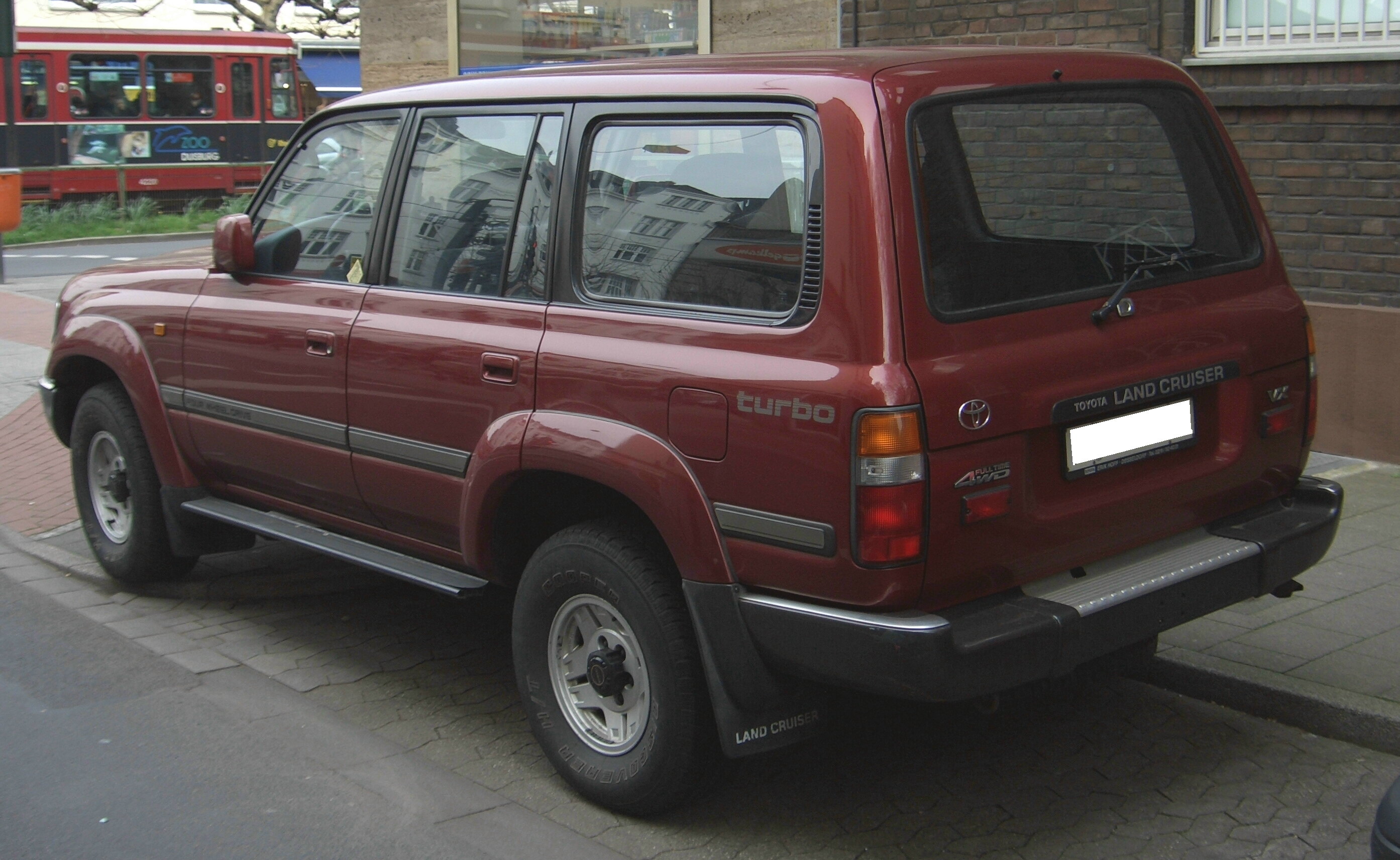
Toyota Land Cruiser (pre-facelift with lift-up tailgate)

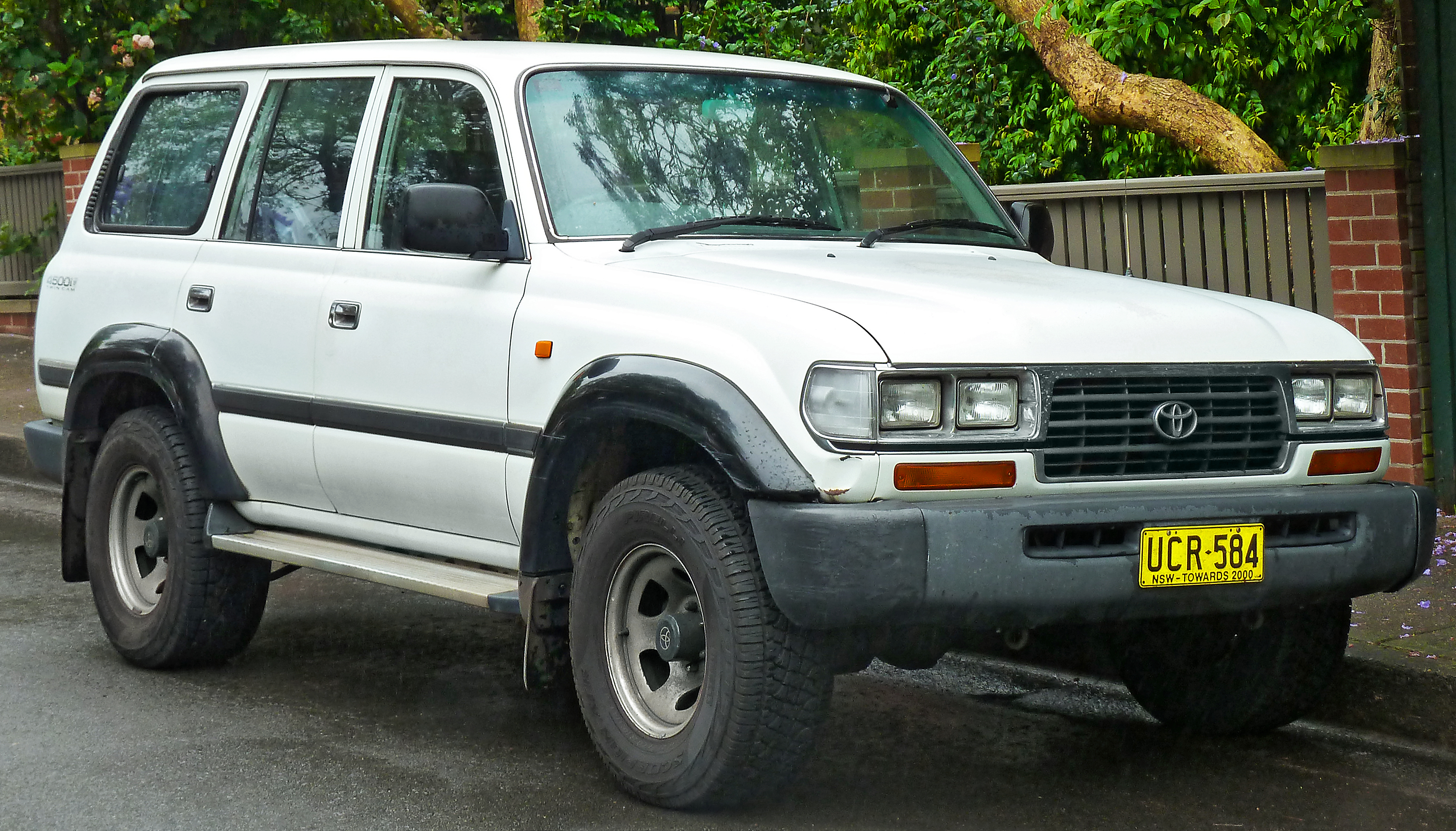
Toyota Land Cruiser GXL (FZJ80, post-facelift)

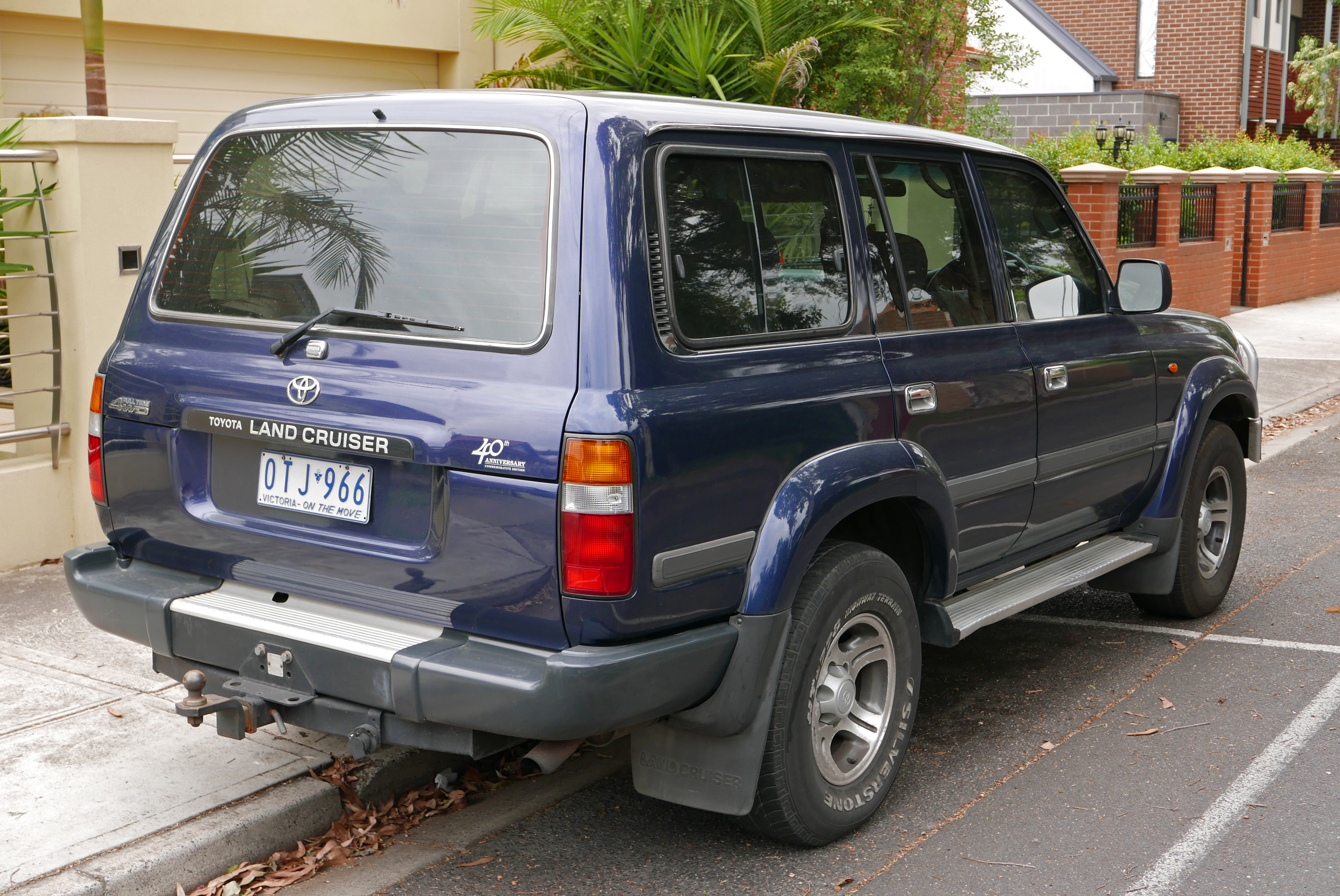
Toyota Land Cruiser 40th Anniversary (HZJ80; post-facelift, rear view)

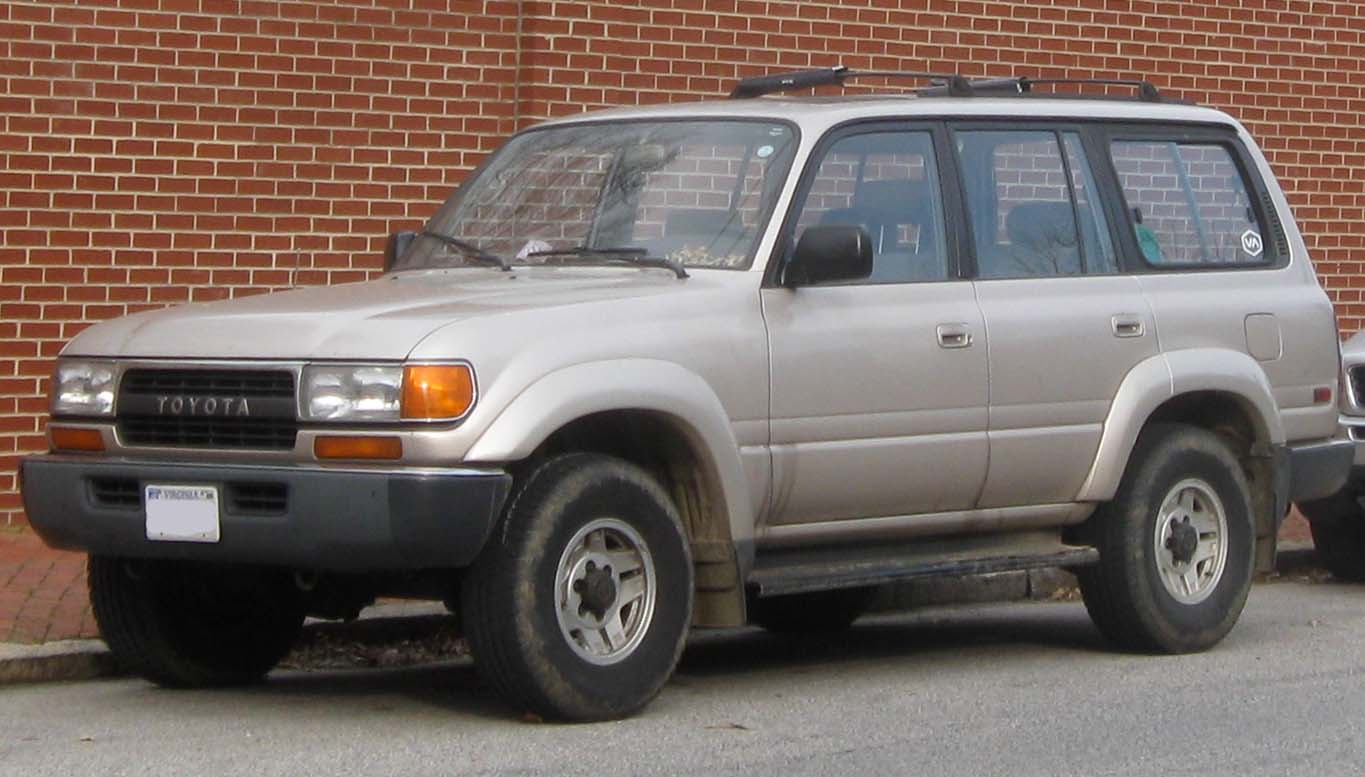
Land Cruiser in Maryland, 2010

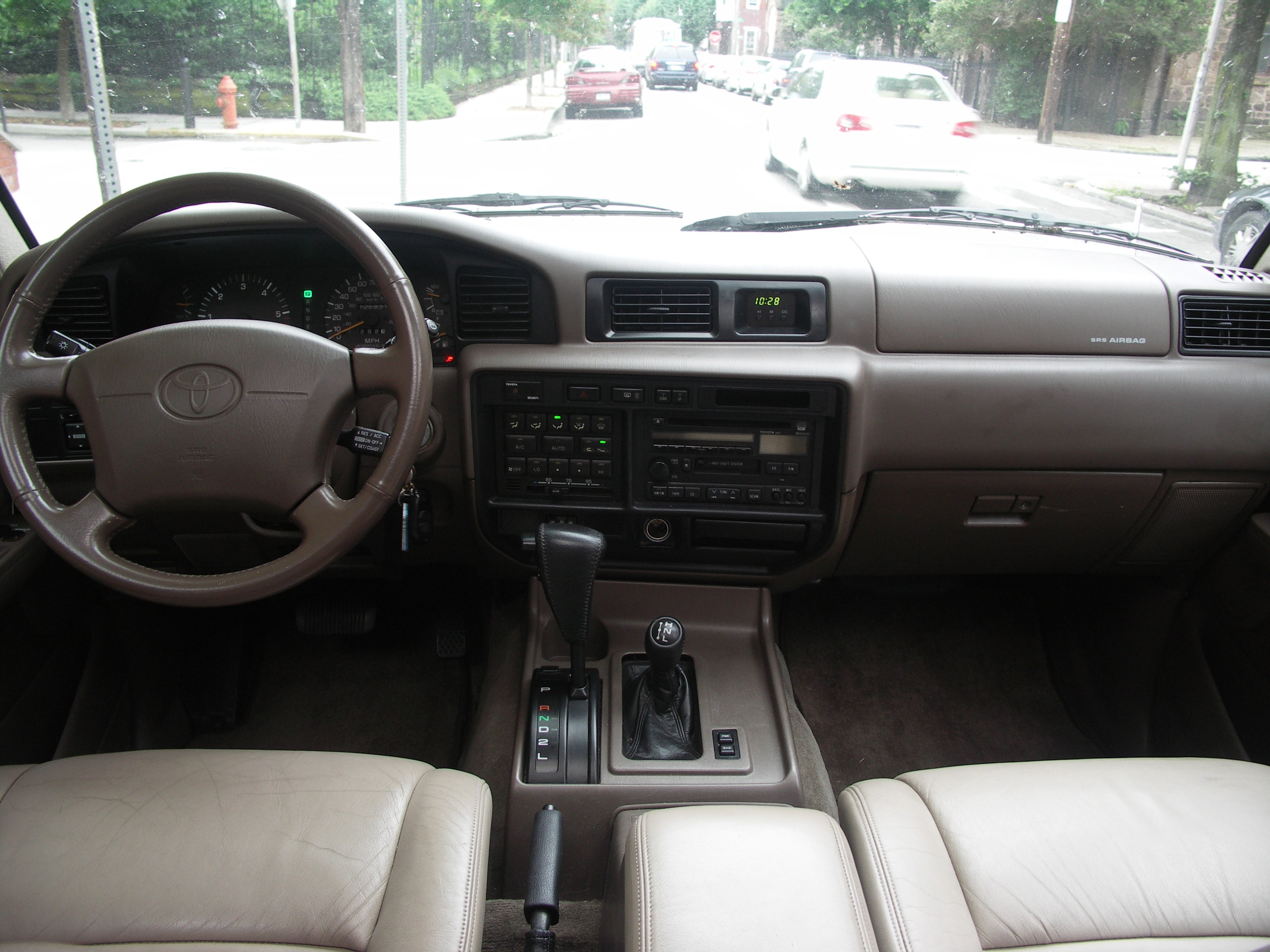
Interior

=== J100 (1998) ===
J100
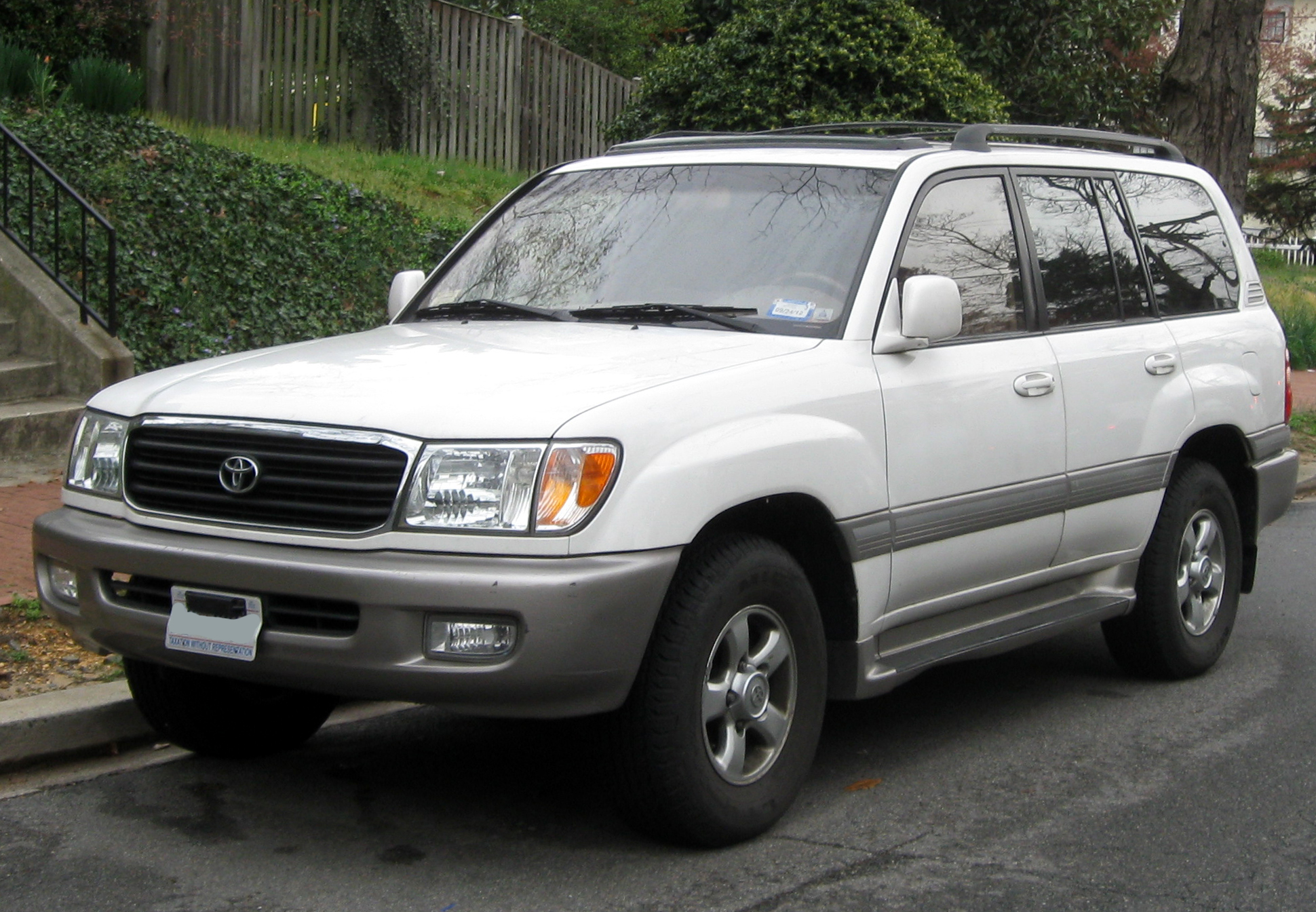
- Toyota Land Cruiser (J100) Pre-facelift

Overview
- Also called: Lexus LX 470; Toyota Land Cruiser Amazon (UK)
- Production: January 1998 – August 2007
- Model years: 1998–2007
- Assembly: Japan: Toyota City (Araco); China: Changchun City (SFTM: 2003–2008)
- Designer: Takeo Kondo

Body and chassis
- Body style: 5-door SUV
- Layout: Front-engine, four-wheel-drive

Powertrain
- Engine: Petrol: 4.5 L 1FZ-FE I6; 4.7 L 2UZ-FE VVT-i V8; Diesel: 4.2 L 1HZ I6; 4.2 L 1HD-T turbocharged I6; 4.2 L 1HD-FTE turbocharged I6
- Transmission: 4-speed automatic; 5-speed automatic; 5-speed manual

Dimensions
- Wheelbase: 2,850 mm (112.2 in)
- Length: 4,890 mm (192.5 in)
- Width: 1,941 mm (76.4 in)
- Height: 1,849 mm (72.8 in)
- Curb weight: 2,320 kg (5,115 lb)

==== Development ====
In January 1998, the 100 series Land Cruiser was introduced to replace the eight-year-old 80 series. The 100 series was previewed in October 1997 as the "Grand Cruiser" at the 32nd Tokyo Motor Show. Development began in 1991 under code name 404T, with the final design being frozen in mid-1994.

There are two distinct versions of the 100-series, the 100 and the 105. The two versions look very similar, but there are significant differences under the bodywork. Despite these differences and official model names, both the 100 and 105 are collectively known as the 100 series.

The 105 carried over the majority of its chassis and power train from the 80-series with coil suspended solid axles front and rear, and straight-6 petrol and diesel engines. These models were only sold in African, Australian, Russian, and South American markets.

In 1998, a suspension system combining Active Height Control (AHC) and Skyhook TEMS Toyota Electronic Modulated Suspension on the Land Cruiser J100 was introduced.

==== Specifications ====
The 100 models were fitted with a slightly wider chassis, independent front suspension (IFS) and two new engines. The change to IFS was a first for a Land Cruiser, and was made (in combination with rack-and-pinion steering) to improve on-road handling. However, it also limited the vehicle's off-road capability and durability; hence, the decision to offer the solid-axle 105 models alongside the IFS 100 models in some markets was made.

Despite the 100 and 105 bodies being very similar, there are some exterior visual indications between both models. The most obvious is the front end of the vehicle often appearing lower than the rear on the 100 models, due to the IFS. The other indicator is the design of the wheels: the 100 models have almost flat wheel designs, while the 105 models have dished wheels. This difference allows both versions to retain similar wheel tracks, despite the 100 having a relatively wider axle track to allow for the IFS system.

The introduction of a V8 engine was also a first for a Land Cruiser, and was specifically intended to improve sales in the North-American market, where it was the only engine available. In Australia, the 100 V8 was initially only available in the range-topping GXV model, while entry and mid-range models were the 105 powered by the 1FZ-FE I6 petrol, or 1HZ diesel engines. The new 1HD-FTE turbo-diesel 100 was added to the Australian range in October 2000 after being available in Europe and the UK since the vehicle's launch in 1998. The automotive press in Australia was critical of Toyota's decision to offer the acclaimed 1HD-FTE engine only in combination with IFS. Australian 4WD Monthly magazine stated "We will never forgive Toyota for going independent at the front with the mighty 4.2 turbo-diesel".

The 100 series offered a selectable rear axle differential locker available as an option for model years 1998–1999.

The 100 series formed the basis for the Lexus LX 470, which was also sold in Japan as the Toyota Cygnus.

The 100 series was called the Toyota Land Cruiser Amazon in the UK and Ireland from 1998 to 2007.

In 2000, Toyota celebrated the 50th anniversary of the Land Cruiser with commemorative models offered in several countries. Total global production to date was 3.72 million vehicles.

In 2002, Toyota introduced Night View on the Toyota Land Cruiser Cygnus and Lexus LX 470. This system uses the headlight projectors emitting near infrared light aimed like the car's high-beam headlights and a CCD camera then captures that reflected radiation, this signal is then processed by a computer which produces a black-and-white image which is projected on the lower section of the windshield. It was also the first Toyota vehicle with roll-over sensor and control logic.

The 100 series remained in production until late 2007, with several minor facelifts such as headlights, tail lights, front grille, rear spoiler and specification changes introduced over the years.

==== Engines ====
| Designation | Engine | Power | Torque | Availability |
|---|---|---|---|---|
| HZJ105 | 1HZ 4.2 L diesel I6 | 96 kW (131 PS; 129 hp) at 3,800 rpm | 271 N⋅m (200 lb⋅ft) at 2,200 rpm | Africa, Asia, Australia, Middle East, South America |
| FZJ105 | 1FZ-FE 4.5 L petrol I6 | 180 kW (245 PS; 241 hp) at 4,600 rpm | 410 N⋅m (302 lb⋅ft) at 3,600 rpm | Africa, Asia, Australia, Middle East, South America |
| FZJ100 | 1FZ-FE 4.5 L petrol I6 | 180 kW (245 PS; 241 hp) at 4,600 rpm | 410 N⋅m (302 lb⋅ft) at 3,600 rpm | Middle East, China |
| UZJ100 | 2UZ-FE 4.7 L petrol V8 | 170 kW (231 PS; 228 hp) at 4,800 rpm | 410 N⋅m (302 lb⋅ft) at 3,400 rpm | Africa, Asia, Australia, China, Europe, Japan, Middle East, North America, UK |
| HDJ100^{1} | 1HD-T 4.2 L turbo-diesel I6 | 123 kW (167 PS; 165 hp) at 3,600 rpm | 352 N⋅m (260 lb⋅ft) at 2,000 rpm | Africa, South America |
| HDJ100^{2} | 1HD-FTE 4.2 L turbo-diesel I6 | 150 kW (204 PS; 201 hp) at 3,400 rpm | 430 N⋅m (317 lb⋅ft) at 1,400 rpm | Australia*, Europe, Japan, Middle East, New Zealand, UK |

*This engine was not introduced in Australia until 2000.

The 100-series is generally considered a durable and reliable vehicle, however there have been three known issues identified, generally for vehicles operating in harsh conditions:

- The IFS 100-series gained a reputation for front suspension failures in operating conditions where the front suspension was prone to hitting the bump stops. Several companies produce strengthened lower wishbones to prevent cracks from developing.
- Both the IFS 100 and live-axle 105 models have been reported to be suffering from broken front differential centres when driven in harsh conditions. The most common front differential failures in IFS models are reported in vehicles produced between mid-1997 and mid-1999 (i.e., the model years 1998 and 1999), when Toyota fitted the 100 Series IFS with a 2-pinion front differential (the pinion gear would flex away from the ring gear under shock loads). In 1999 (model year 2000) the IFS Landcruiser received a 4-pinion front differential that was more robust – fewer failures were reported.

Gallery

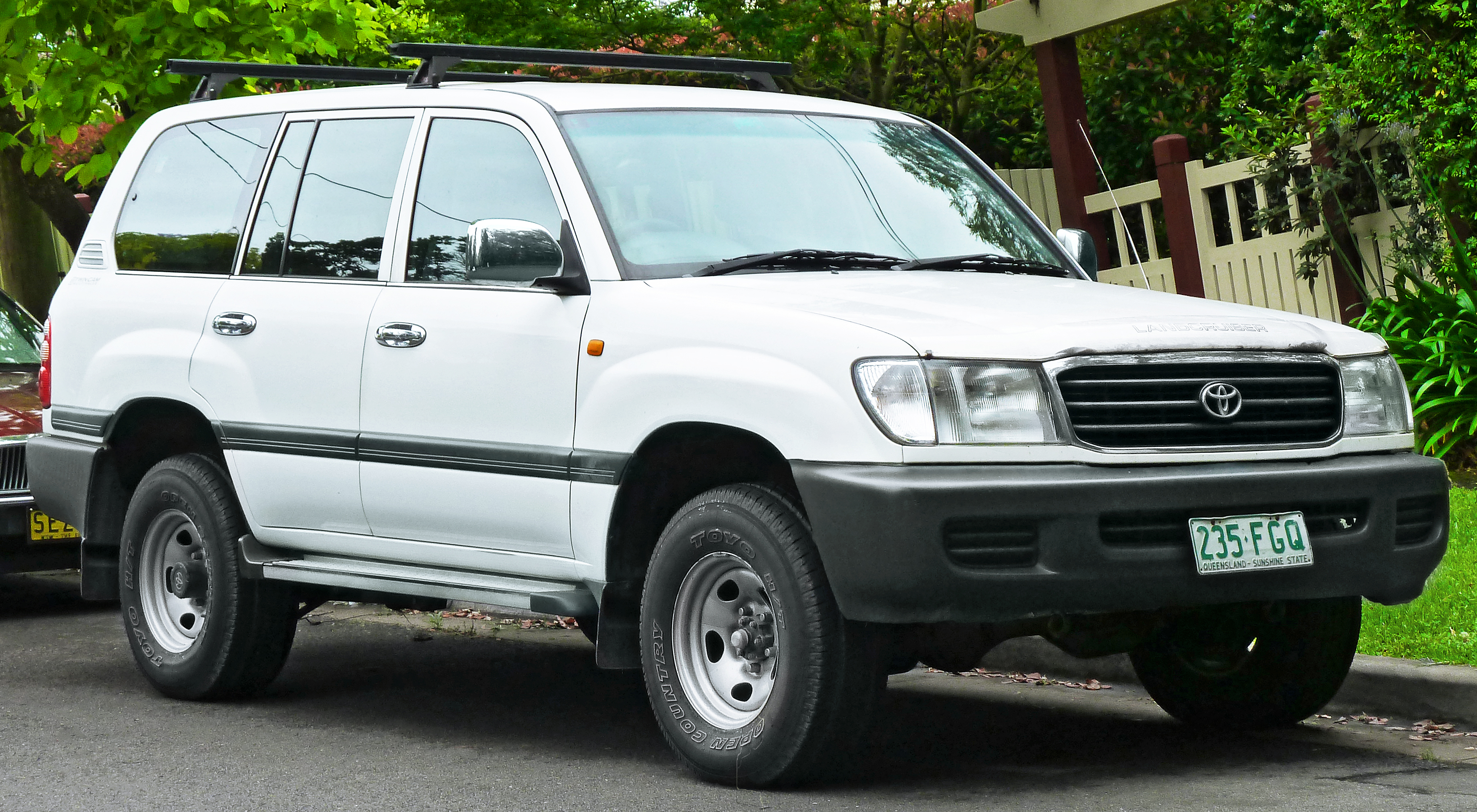
Pre-facelift Toyota Land Cruiser GXL (FZJ105)

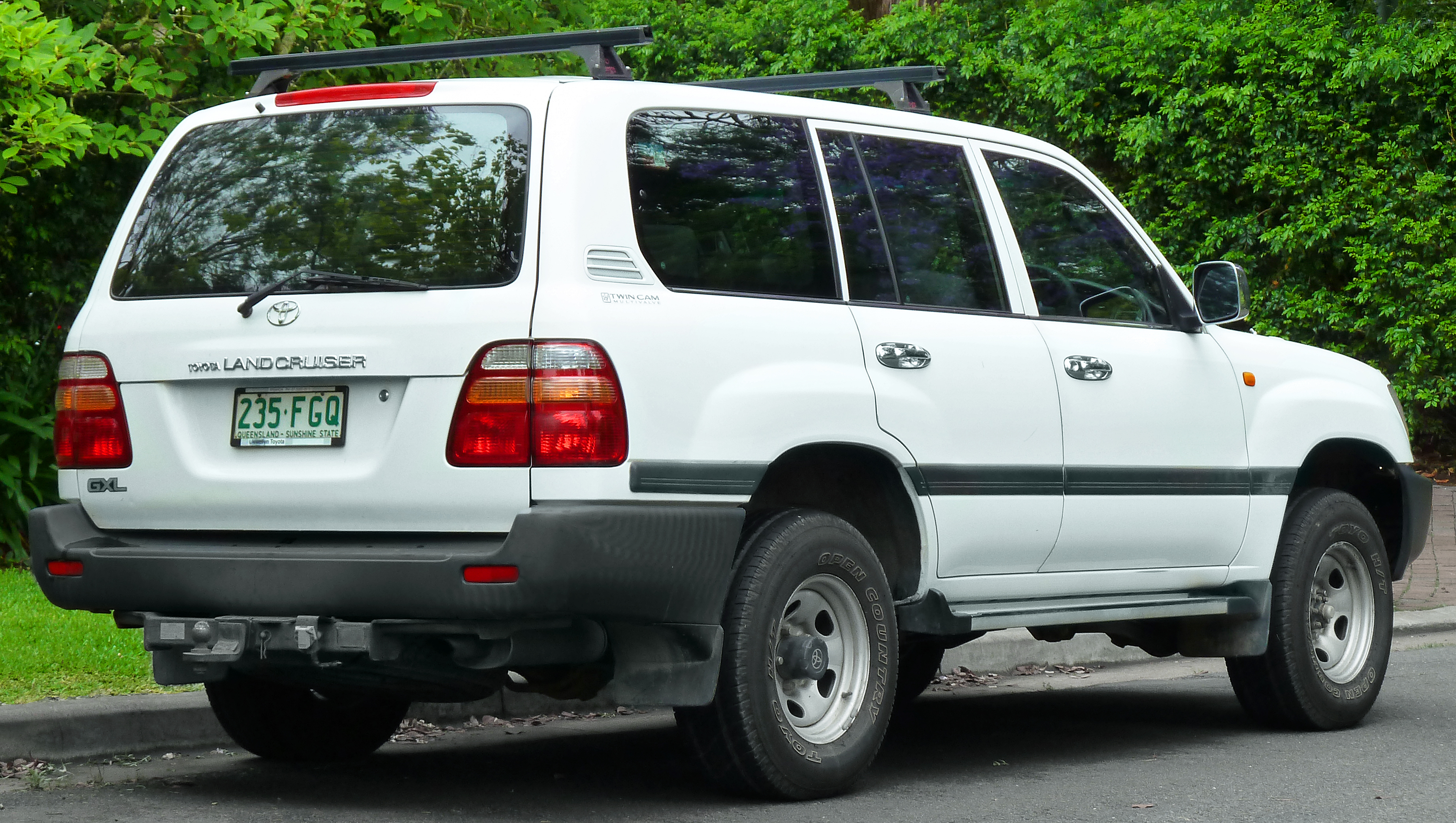
Pre-facelift Toyota Land Cruiser GXL (FZJ105)

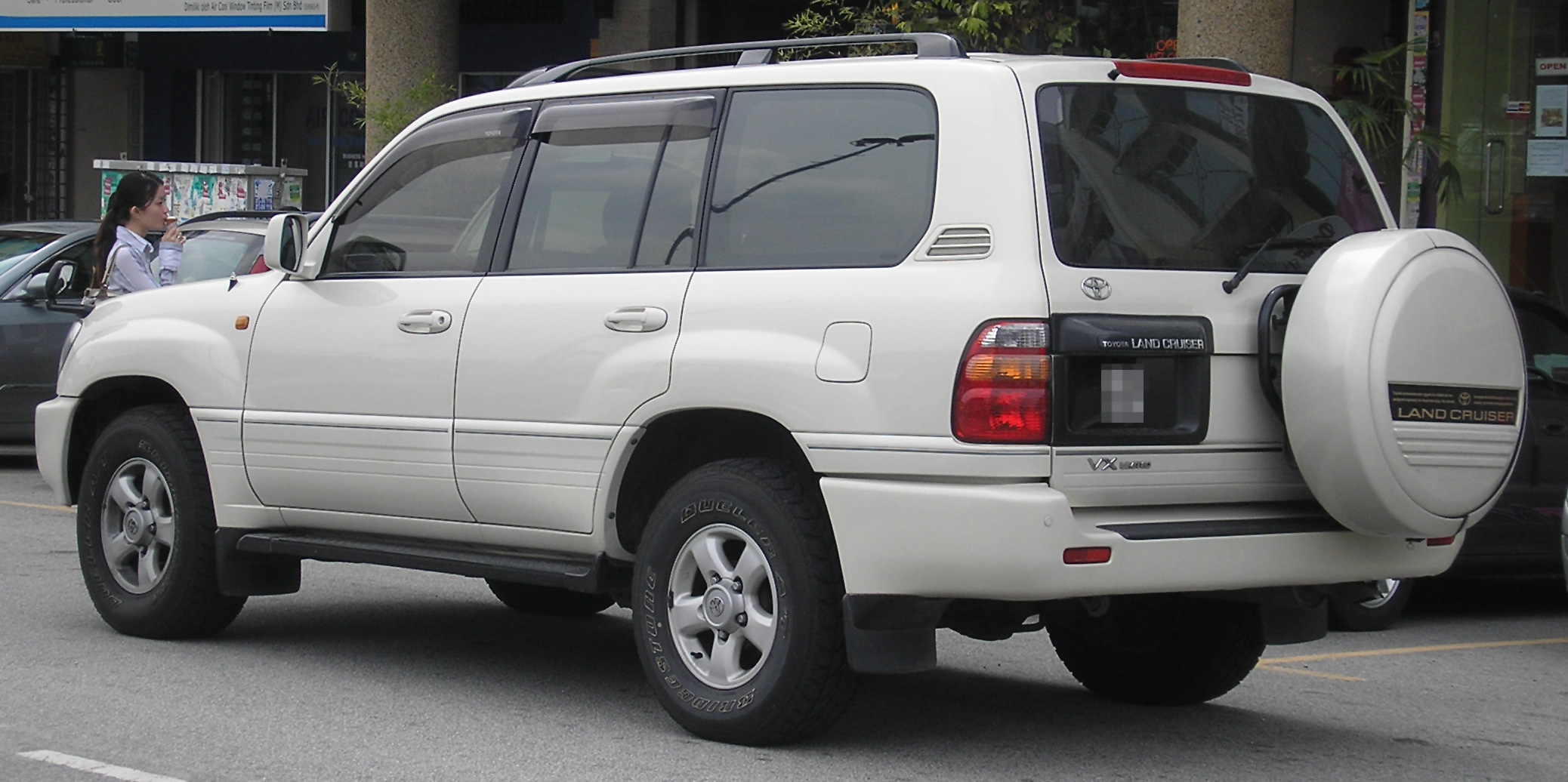
Toyota Land Cruiser (with spare wheel on the rear)

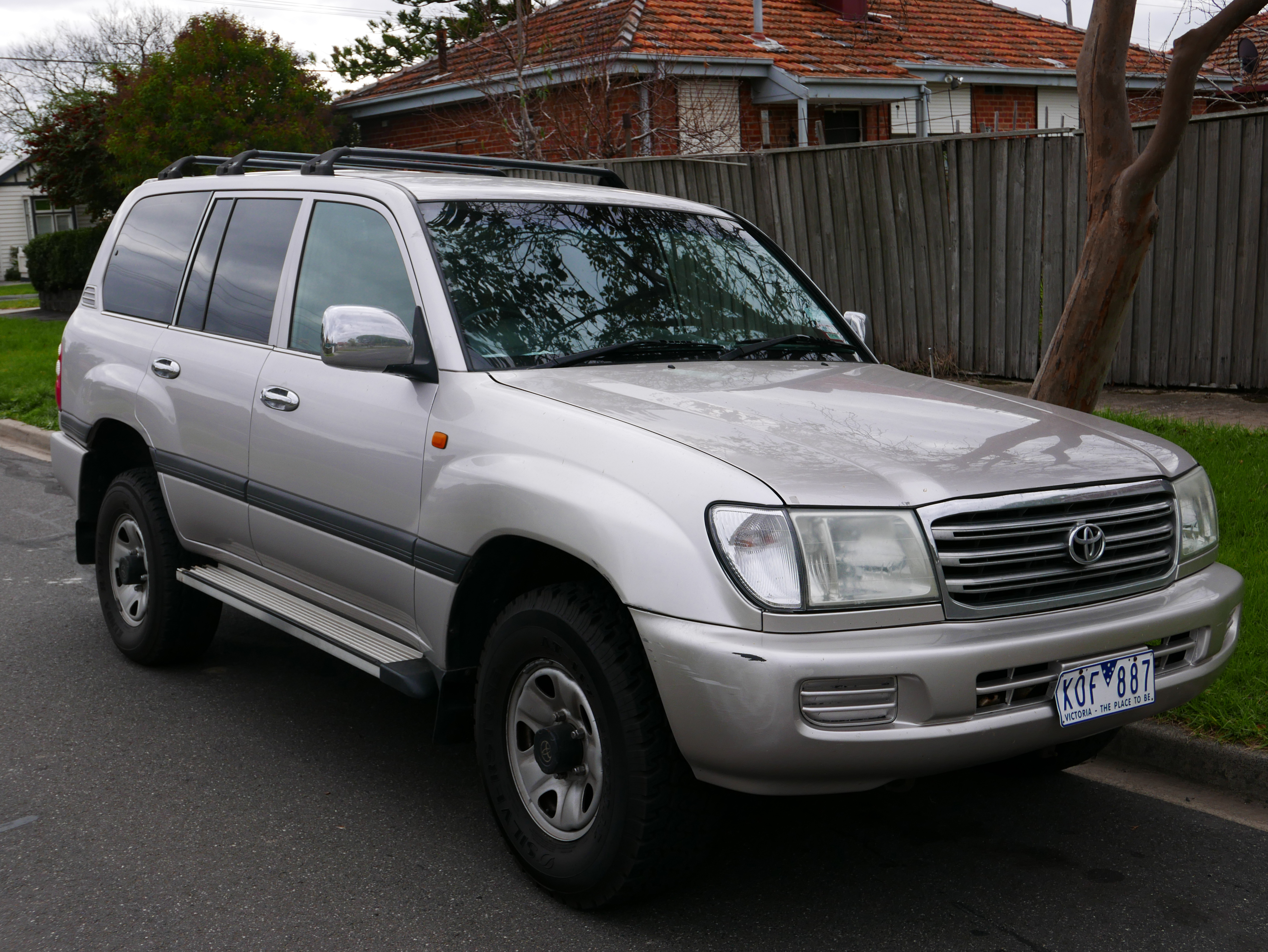
First facelift Toyota Land Cruiser GXL (UZJ100)

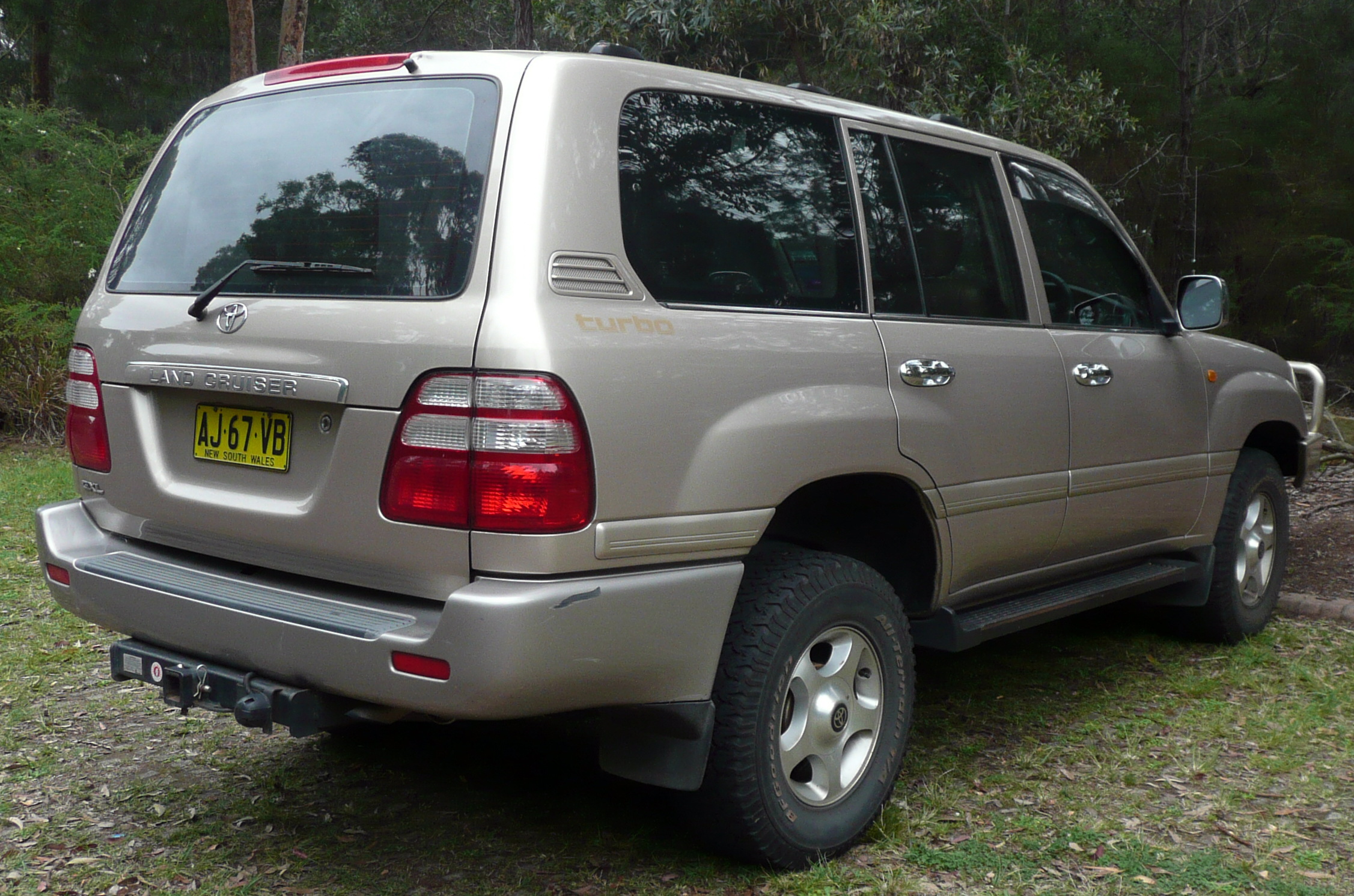
First facelift Toyota Land Cruiser GXL (HDJ100)

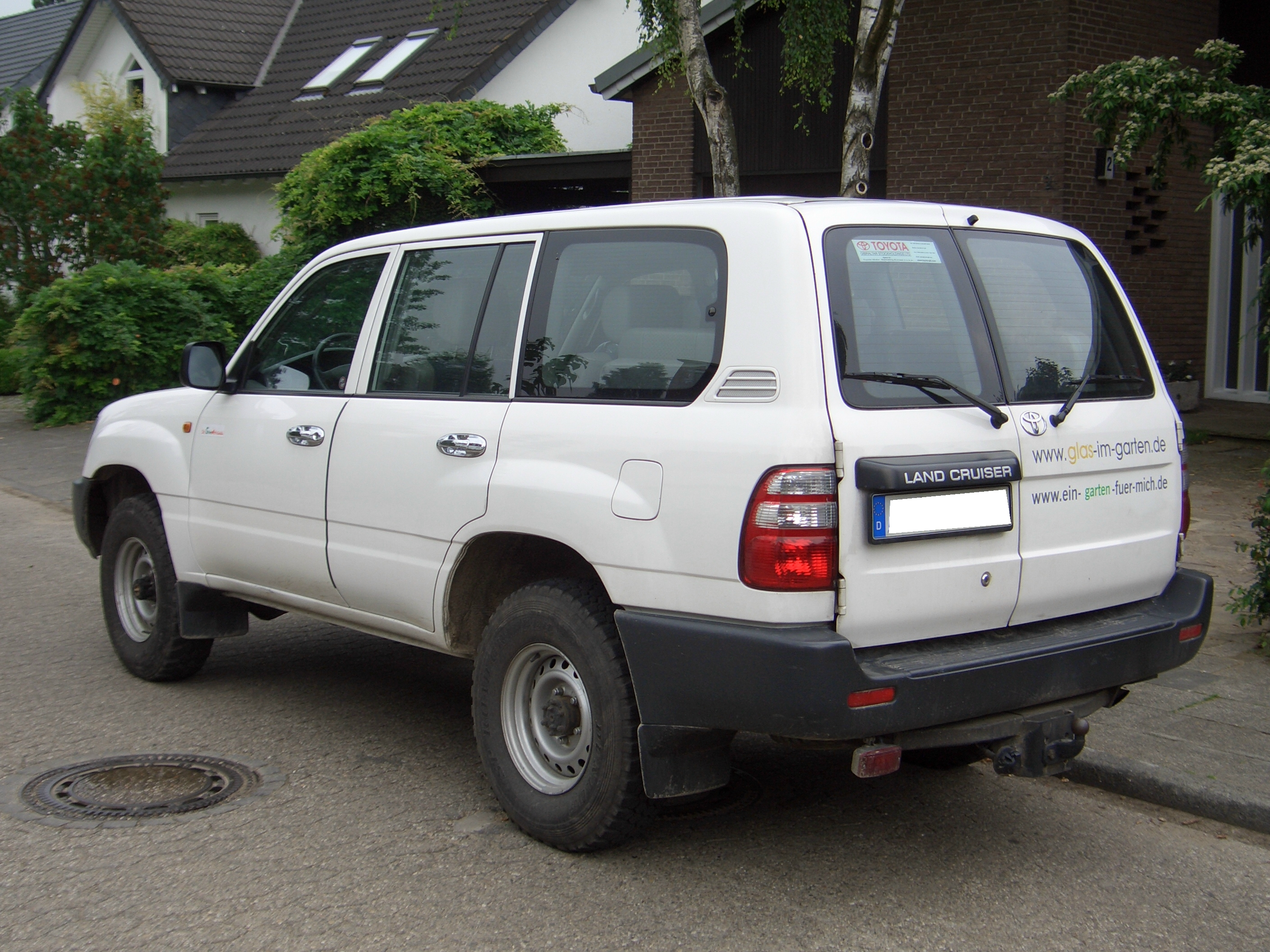
First facelift Toyota Land Cruiser (HZJ105; with outback doors)

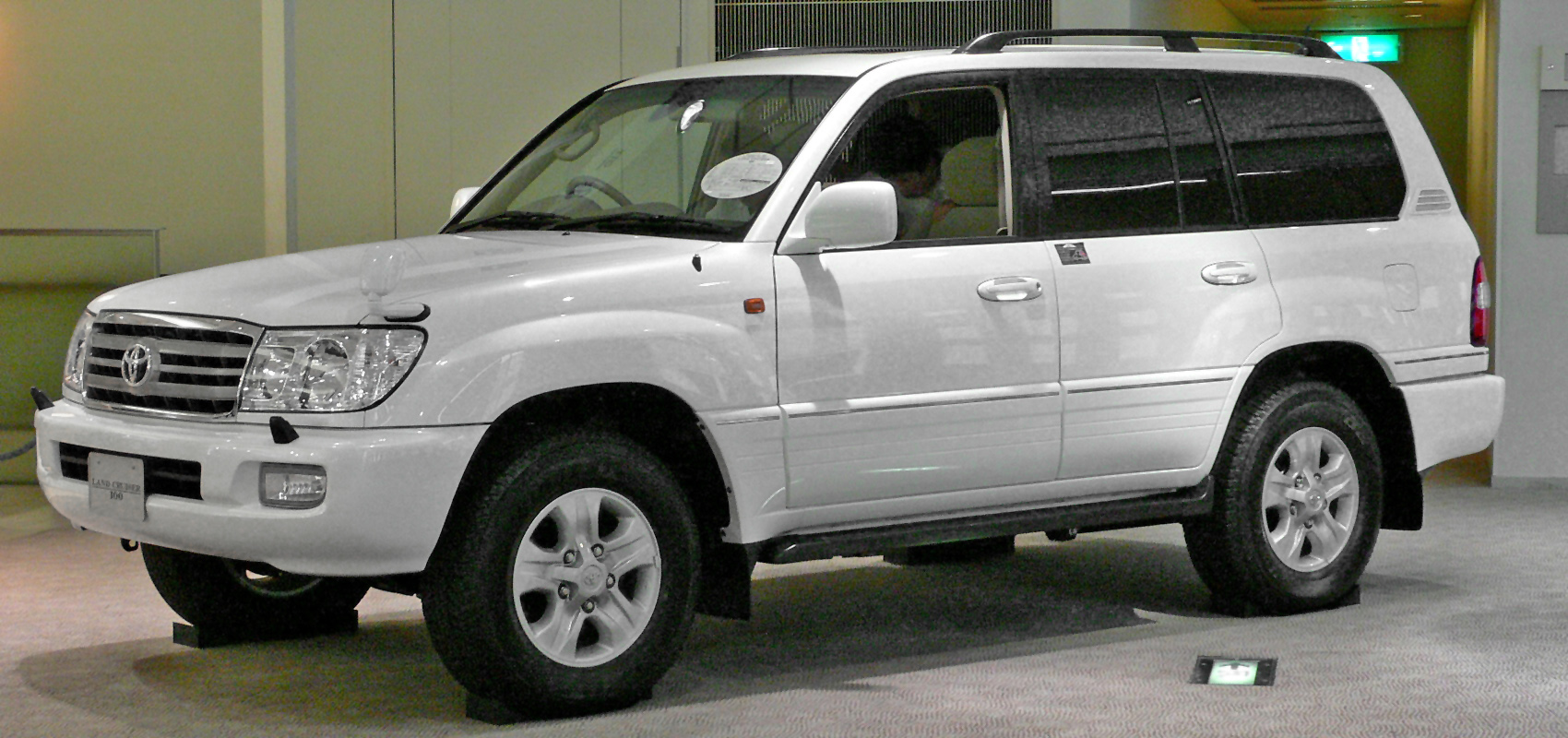
Second facelift Toyota Land Cruiser VX Limited (UZJ100)

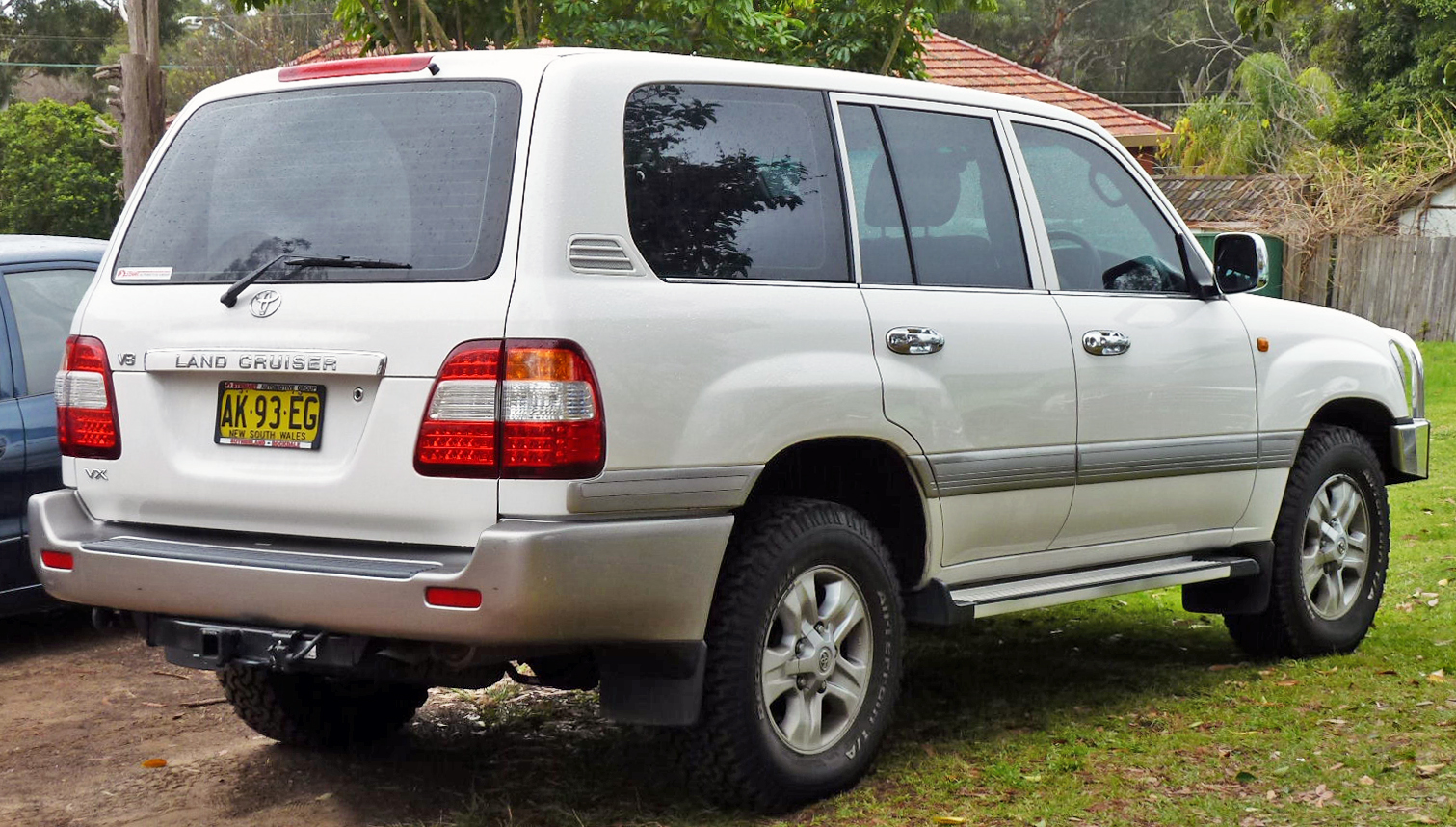
Second facelift Toyota Land Cruiser VX (UZJ100)

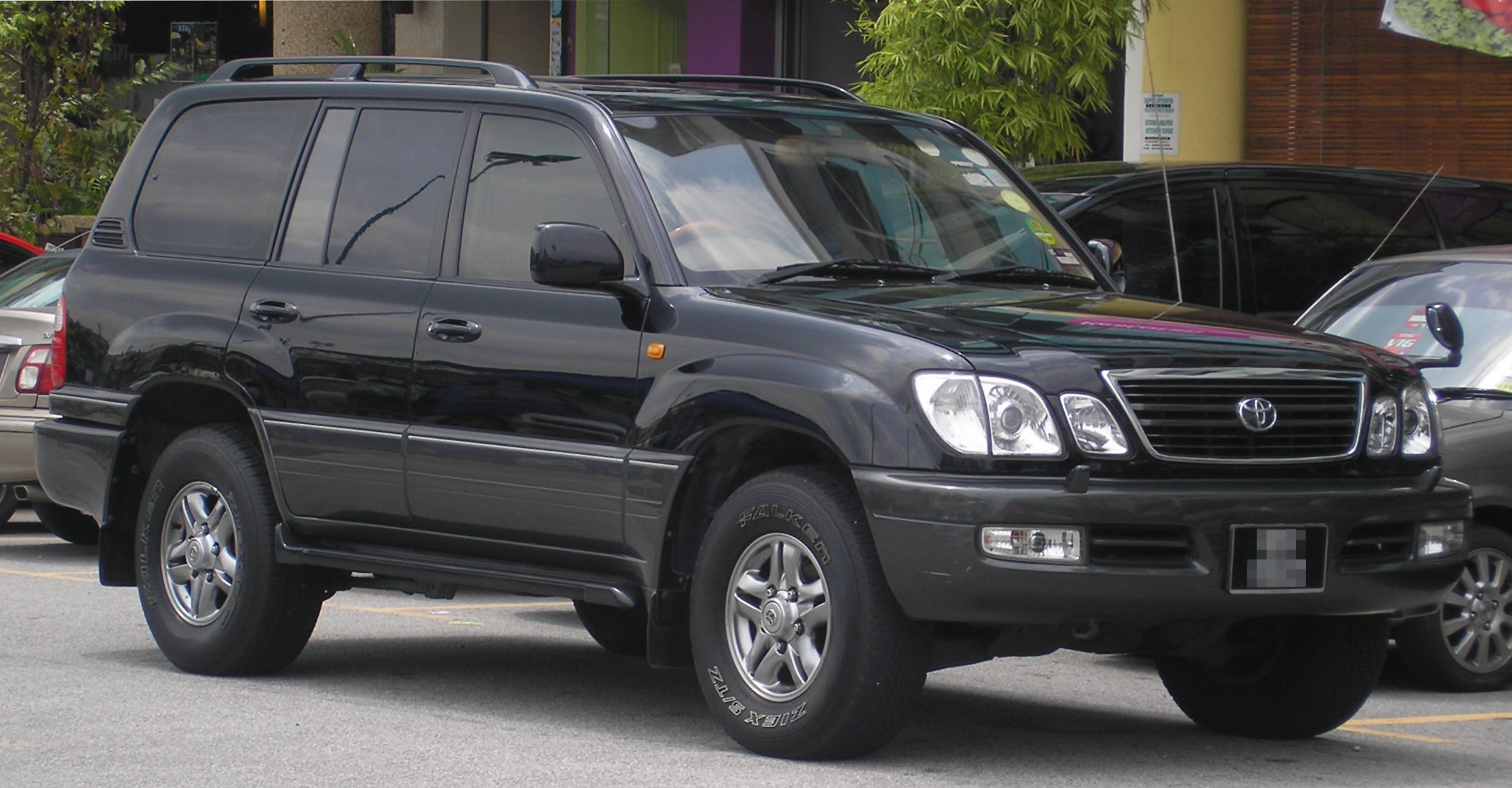
1998–2002 Toyota Land Cruiser Cygnus

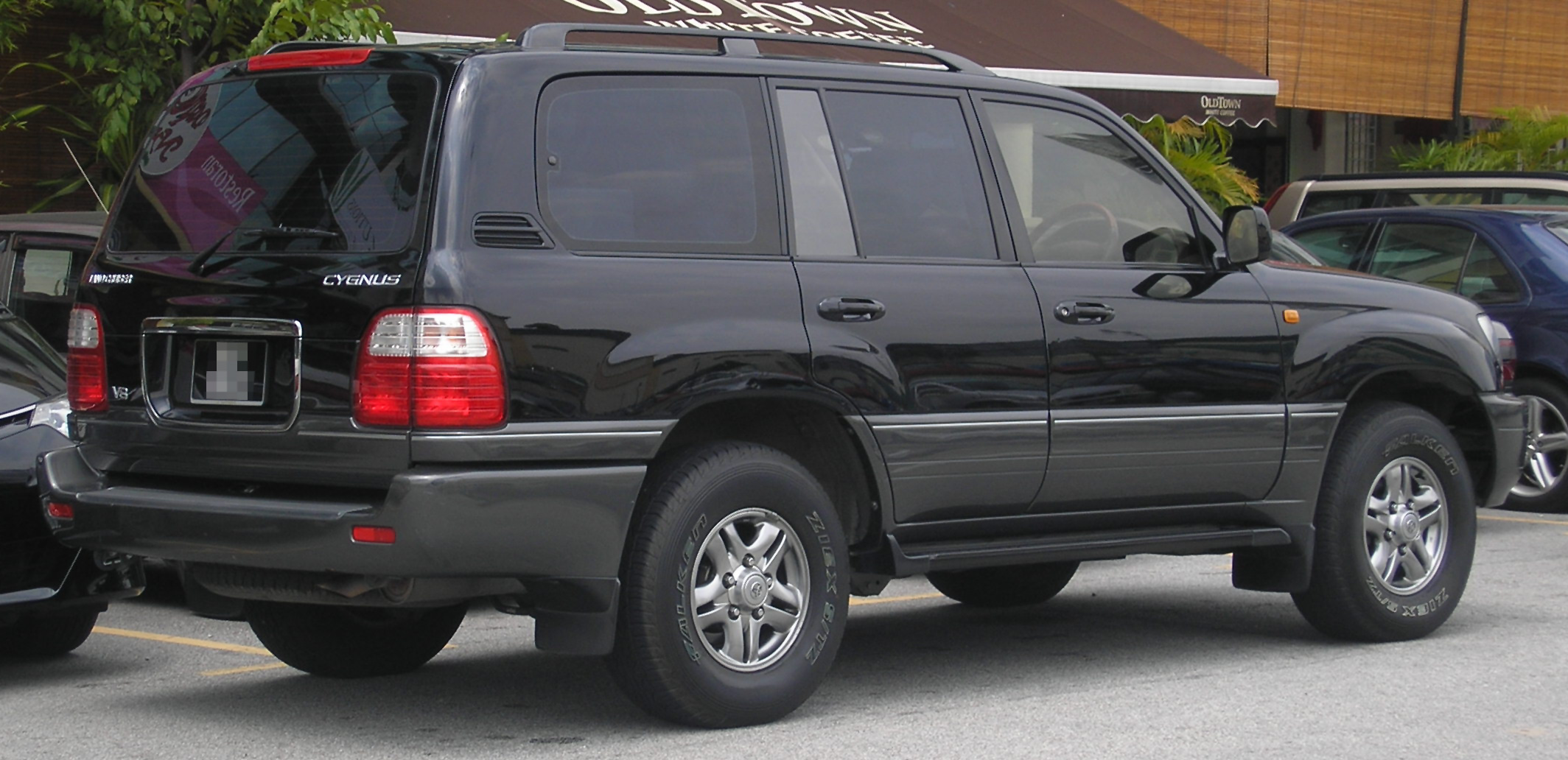
1998–2002 Toyota Land Cruiser Cygnus

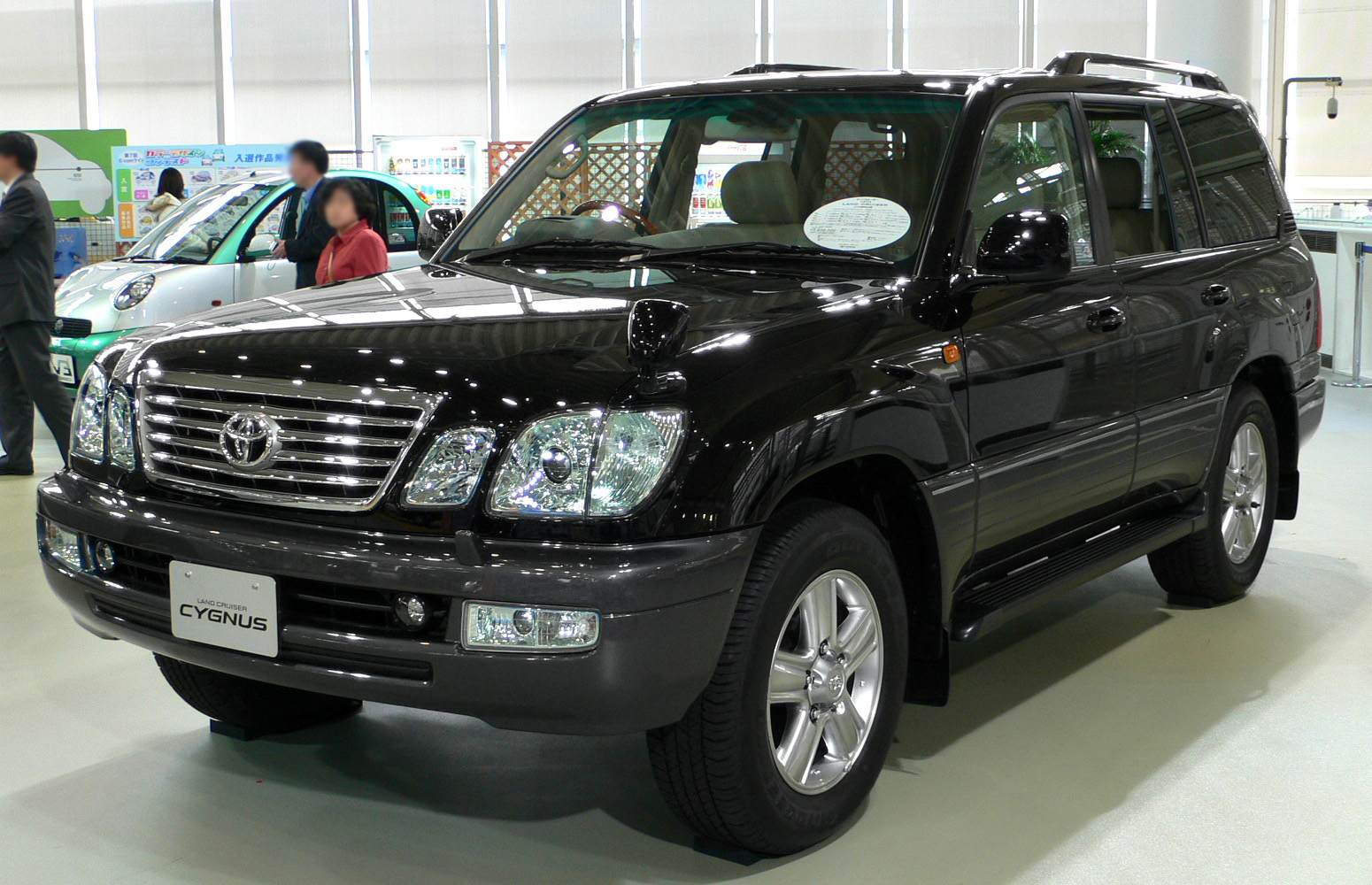
2005–2007 Toyota Land Cruiser Cygnus (Japan)

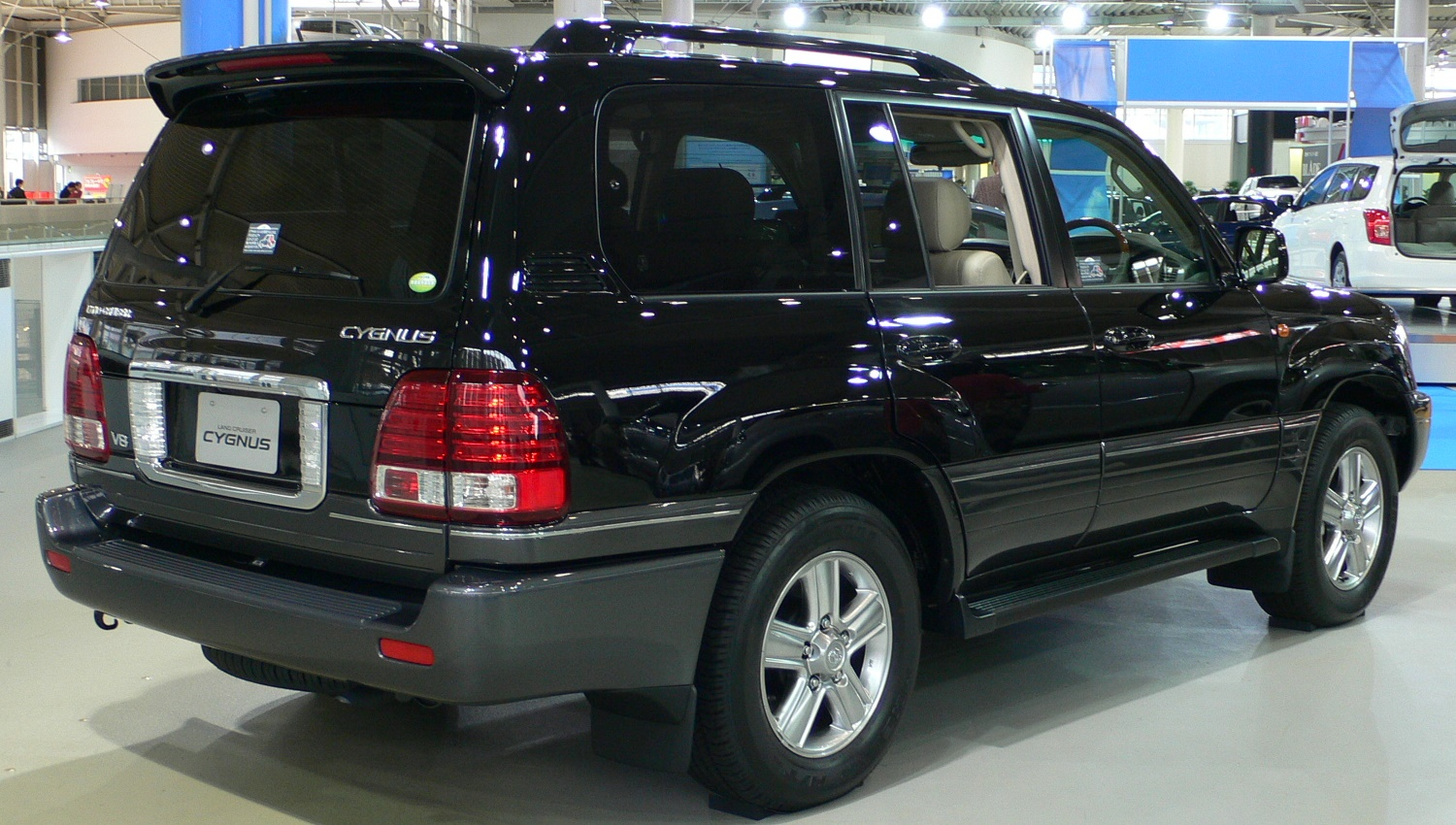
2005–2007 Toyota Land Cruiser Cygnus (Japan)

==== Safety ====
ANCAP test results* Toyota Landcruiser LC100 wagon (2002)
| Test | Score |
|---|---|
| Overall | 4 /5 stars |
| Frontal offset | 8.90/16 |
| Side impact | 16/16 |
| Pole | Not Assessed |
| Seat belt reminders | 0/3 |
| Whiplash protection | Not Assessed |
| Pedestrian protection | Poor |
| Electronic stability control | Optional |

=== J200 (2007) ===
J200
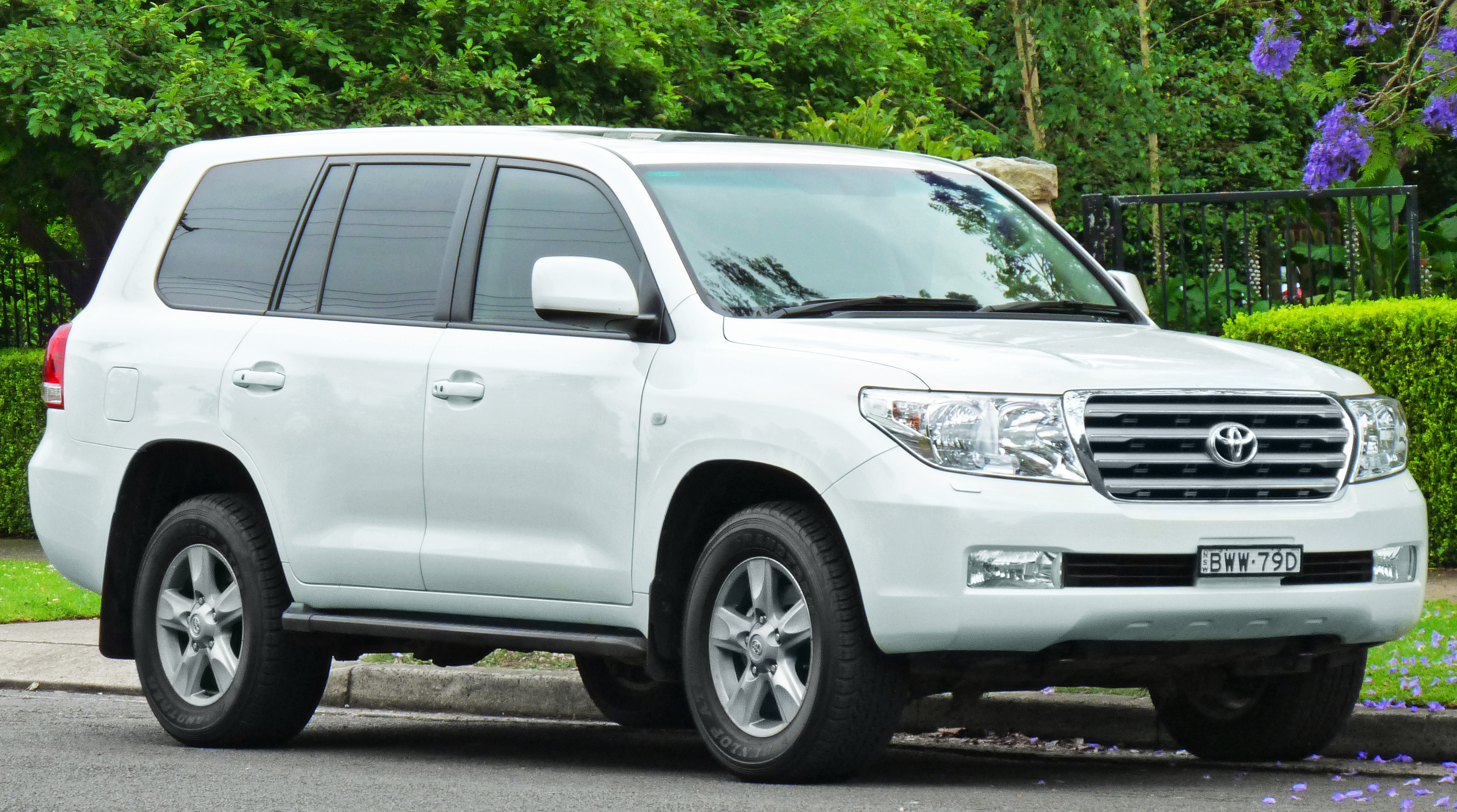
- 2011 Toyota Land Cruiser (UZJ200; pre-facelift)

Overview
- Also called: Lexus LX (J200); Toyota Land Cruiser V8 (Europe)
- Production: September 2007 – March 2021
- Model years: 2008–2021
- Assembly: Japan: Toyota, Aichi (Yoshiwara plant); Tahara, Aichi (Tahara plant); China: Changchun (SFTM: 2008–2016)
- Designer: Takumi Nakamura, Takayasu Furukawa, Hideo Karikomi, Jinichi Sato and Kengo Iwanaga; Tetsu Endō (2012 facelift); Keisuke Matsuno and Kouji Katsuno (2015 facelift)

Body and chassis
- Body style: 5-door SUV
- Layout: Front-engine, four-wheel-drive
- Platform: Toyota F1
- Related: Lexus LX (J200); Toyota Tundra (XK50); Toyota Sequoia (XK60)

Powertrain
- Engine: Petrol: 4.0 L 1GR-FE VVT-i V6; 4.6 L 1UR-FE D-4S V8; 4.7 L 2UZ-FE VVT-i V8; 5.7 L 3UR-FE Dual VVT-i V8; Diesel: 4.5 L 1VD-FTV D-4D turbocharged V8
- Power output: 170–202 kW (228–271 hp; 231–275 PS) (1GR-FE); 227–234 kW (304–314 hp; 309–318 PS) (1UR-FE); 202–212 kW (271–284 hp; 275–288 PS) (2UZ-FE); 270–284 kW (362–381 hp; 367–386 PS) (3UR-FE); 136–213 kW (182–286 hp; 185–290 PS) (1VD-FTV)
- Transmission: 5-speed manual (1GR-FE); 5-speed automatic (1GR-FE, 2UZ-FE); 6-speed automatic (1UR-FE, 1VD-FTV, 3UR-FE 2007–2015, 1GR-FE 2017–2021); 8-speed automatic (3UR-FE 2015–2021)

Dimensions
- Wheelbase: 2,850 mm (112.2 in)
- Length: 4,990 mm (196.5 in)
- Width: 1,980 mm (78.0 in)
- Height: 1,945–1,970 mm (76.6–77.6 in) (adjustable)
- Curb weight: 2,405–2,740 kg (5,302–6,041 lb)

Chronology
- Successor: Toyota Land Cruiser (J250) (UK and North America)

==== Development ====
In 2002, a five-year development plan on a successor to the 100-series platform commenced under Sadayoshi Koyari and Tetsuya Tada. By 2004, ten years after the design selection of its predecessor in 1994, a final production design was settled on for the 2008 J200. Prototype related tests were conducted for over two years between 2004 and early 2007.

The redesigned Toyota Land Cruiser was introduced in late 2007. Known as the 200 Series, it is also sold alongside the platform-sharing Lexus LX 570 in some markets. The frame and platform is newly developed, bigger brake rotors and calipers were added and the front suspension was strengthened. The underbelly is also protected by skid plates. The roof pillars were redesigned to better protect occupants in a rollover.

The vehicle entered production in September 2007 and was available for sale from September or November, depending on country. It became available in Venezuela for sale in early November of the same year under the local nickname of "Roraima" (taken from Mount Roraima).

==== Specifications ====
The 200 Series offered numerous features and upgrades over its predecessor not limited to the cosmetic changes made to the body and interior, including:

- Smart Entry – A sensor is triggered when the remote is brought near the vehicle, allowing the user to simply touch the door handle to open it.
- Smart Start – Start/Stop push button for ignition; a key is not required.
- 4-zone climate control on Sahara models, with outlet vents increased from 18 to 28
- 10 airbags (VX & Sahara)
- A stronger and lighter frame

Various driver assist technologies not offered on previous models are included as standard, including:

- CRAWL, a four-wheel drive control system that operates like an off-road cruise control, automatically maintaining a low uniform vehicle speed using brakes and throttle
- Downhill Assist Control
- Multi-terrain anti-lock braking system (ABS)
- Kinetic Dynamic Suspension System (KDSS) allows for greater wheel articulation
- An optional rear-view camera (VX)
- Leather seats are available in full option (VX)

Engine and transmission improvements include:

- An all new optional V8 diesel engine, the Toyota VD engine (a twin-turbocharged version of the engine used in the 70 Series since 2007).
- Automatic transmission included as standard across all levels of trim of the 200 Series, a five-speed manual transmission is offered only with the 4.0 L GX models (in selected regions). A five-speed automatic gearbox is assigned to the 4.7 L petrol models, while the 4.5 L diesel models receive a six-speed automatic.

==== Markets ====
===== Japan =====
In Japan, Initially the Land Cruiser was offered in 2 variants: AX and G Selection. All models use the 4.7 L V8 2UZ-FE engine and a 6-speed transmission.

The Land Cruiser was updated in April 2009 when it received the 4.6 L V8 1UR-FE engine and the gearbox was replaced with a 6-speed automatic. In the same year, the ZX trim was introduced which is the successor of Cygnus. Although the new 4608 cc 1UR-FE is smaller than the old 4663 cc 2UZ-FE engine, the power has been increased from 212 to 234 kW (288 to 318 PS; 284 to 314 hp), torque increased from 448 to 460 N⋅m (330 to 339 lb⋅ft) and fuel consumption improved from 6.6 to 7.1 km/L (19 to 20 mpg_{‑imp}; 16 to 17 mpg_{‑US}) (Japan 10·15 mode measurement).

In July 2010, the GX variant has been released, primarily for commercial, with simplified equipment to lower the price.

In August 2015, Toyota launched an updated, facelifted version of the J200 Land Cruiser in Japan, which was later sold globally.

===== North America =====
In North America, the Land Cruiser 200 series is offered with one unnamed trim level and engine, the 5.7 L 3UR-FE V8 petrol engine producing 284 kW (386 PS; 381 hp) and 544 N⋅m (401 lb⋅ft) of torque channeled through a six-speed automatic. Towing is rated at 3,700 kg (8,200 lb). Beige or black leather upholstery is standard along with a 14 speaker JBL sound system. Only 18-inch wheels were available.

This second facelift was unveiled in the United States in September 2015 for the 2016 model year.

In February 2019, Toyota introduced a Heritage edition of the Land Cruiser at the Chicago Auto Show as part of the 60th anniversary of the introduction of the FJ40. Toyota built only 1200 vehicles which were only available as a 5-seater sold in the United States. Sales are expected to begin in the third quarter of 2019 for the 2020 model year.

In December 2020, Toyota confirmed to Road & Track that the Land Cruiser would be discontinued in North America after 2021.

===== Middle East =====
In the Middle East, the Land Cruiser 200 series was introduced in late 2007 as a 2008 model, for 2008 to 2010 there was three engine choices:

- 179 kW (243 PS; 240 hp) 4.0 L 1GR-FE petrol engine
- 202 kW (275 PS; 271 hp) 2UZ-FE petrol engine
- 162–173 kW (220–235 PS; 217–232 hp) 1VD-FTV 4.5 L turbo diesel engine

Starting in 2011, the 270 kW (367 PS; 362 hp) 3UR-FE engine was offered along with the previous engines. For 2012, the 1GR-FE gained dual VVT-i and power was increased to 202 kW (275 PS; 271 hp), the 4.7 L 2UZ-FE was dropped in favour of the new 227 kW (309 PS; 304 hp) 4.6 L 1UR-FE, and the 5.7 L and 4.5 L diesel were unchanged, although the latter was dropped in some markets.

===== Europe =====
In the UK, the 200 series was offered in one unnamed variant with a 1VD-FTV engine with power output reached 213 kW (286 hp).

The facelift version was released in the UK and went on sale on 1 March 2012.

In 2015, the Land Cruiser has discontinued in the UK market.

===== Australasia =====
In Oceania, the 200 Series is offered in five different levels of trim: GX, GXL, Altitude, VX and Sahara.

===== China =====
In China, the Land Cruiser 200 was produced from 2008 to 2016 by Sichuan FAW Toyota Motor. The 4.0 L 1GR-FE V6 and 4.7 L 2UZ-FE V8 were the available engine choices – both paired to a 5-speed automatic gearbox. Trim levels were the 4.0 GX-R, 4.0 VX, 4.7 VX and 4.7 VX-R.

==== 2011 facelift ====
In December 2011, for the 2013 model year, a partially facelifted version was released. Toyota added all previously optional safety and luxury options as standard. The Land Cruiser now gets push-button start, HID headlights with beam level adjustment, a power moonroof, automatic rain sensing windshield wipers, heated and ventilated (perforated leather) front and only heated rear seats, a rear-seat DVD entertainment system, Bluetooth, rear-view camera with parking sensors, navigation system, HD radio and Entune. Another new feature is the Multi-terrain Select system which helps control wheelspin and brake lockup giving the selectable choices of: Rock, Rock & Dirt, Mogul, Loose Rock, and Mud & Sand and with an addition to the Multi-terrain Select system a feature known as adaptive Anti-lock Braking system which adapts to the condition of the road like mud or sand and efficiently uses the ABS to reduce braking distance on any type of terrain.

==== 2015 facelift ====
The new version has several mechanical changes, including a new 8-speed electronically controlled automatic transmission (ECT-i) mated to the original 5.7 L 3UR-FE V8 petrol engine, larger front disc brakes, and a higher axle ratio (3.30:1 vs 3.90:1 in the previous years). Updates to the front fascia, grille, bonnet, headlamps (with daylight running lamps), rear tail lamps and bumpers were the main exterior highlights of the facelift. Interior changes included a new multimedia system and interface with larger screens front and back, as well as refreshed interior styling.

==== Engines ====
| Engine | Power | Torque | Region | Years |
|---|---|---|---|---|
| 2UZ-FE V8 4,663 cc (284.6 cu in) | 202 kW (271 hp) at 5,400 rpm | 410 N⋅m (302 lbf⋅ft) at 3,400 rpm | Hong Kong and Australia | 2007–2012 |
| 1UR-FE V8 4,608 cc (281.2 cu in) | 233 kW (313 hp) at 5,500 rpm | 460 N⋅m (339 lbf⋅ft) at 3,400 rpm | Hong Kong and Australia | 2012–2014 |
| 1UR-FE V8 4,608 cc (281.2 cu in) | 237 kW (318 hp) at 5,500 rpm | 460 N⋅m (339 lbf⋅ft) at 3,400 rpm | Japan | 2015-2021 |
| 3UR-FE V8 5,663 cc (345.6 cu in) | 270 kW (362 hp) at 5,600 rpm | 530 N⋅m (391 lbf⋅ft) at 3,200 rpm | GCC, Australia, Russia, Ukraine, Armenia (since 2008), Kazakhstan, China, Taiwan, Indonesia, Philippines, Chile, South Africa, New Zealand, Vietnam (since Dec 2013), Malaysia (since Dec 2015) | 2007–2021 |
| 3UR-FE V8 5,663 cc (345.6 cu in) | 286 kW (383 hp) at 5,600 rpm | 546 N⋅m (403 lb⋅ft) at 3,600 rpm | United States, Canada | 2007–2021 |
| 3UR-FE V8 5,663 cc (345.6 cu in) | 336 kW (450 hp) at 5,400 rpm | 706 N⋅m (521 lb⋅ft) at 3,200 rpm | Middle East (special edition) | 2014–2015 |
| 1VD-FTV V8 4,461 cc (272.2 cu in) Turbodiesel | 200 kW (268 hp) at 3,600 rpm | 650 N⋅m (479 lbf⋅ft) at 1,600–2,800 rpm | Russia, Ukraine, Paraguay, New Zealand, South Africa, Saudi Arabia, Indonesia, Armenia, Georgia (since 2018), India (since 2017), Australia (since April 2018) | 2015–2021 |

==== Motorsports ====
The J200 Land Cruiser has been used in various off-road and rally raid competitions, most notably the Dakar Rally. Team Land Cruiser Toyota Auto Body raced the 200 Series in the Group T2 production class of the Dakar Rally from 2009 to 2022. The team went on to win nine consecutive class victories, from 2014 to 2022, racing the J200 Land Cruiser.

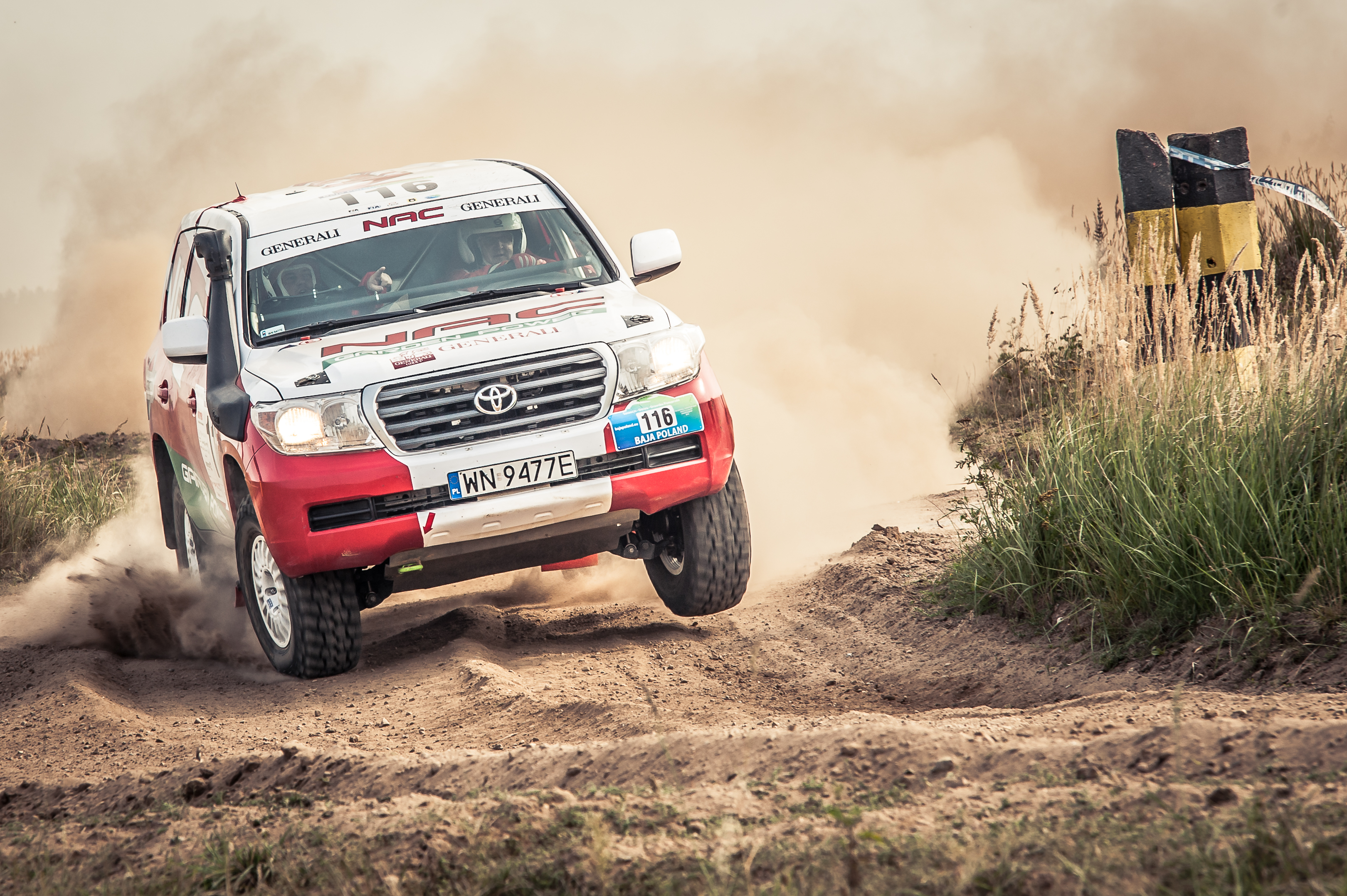
J200 Land Cruiser racing in the FIA Baja Poland rally

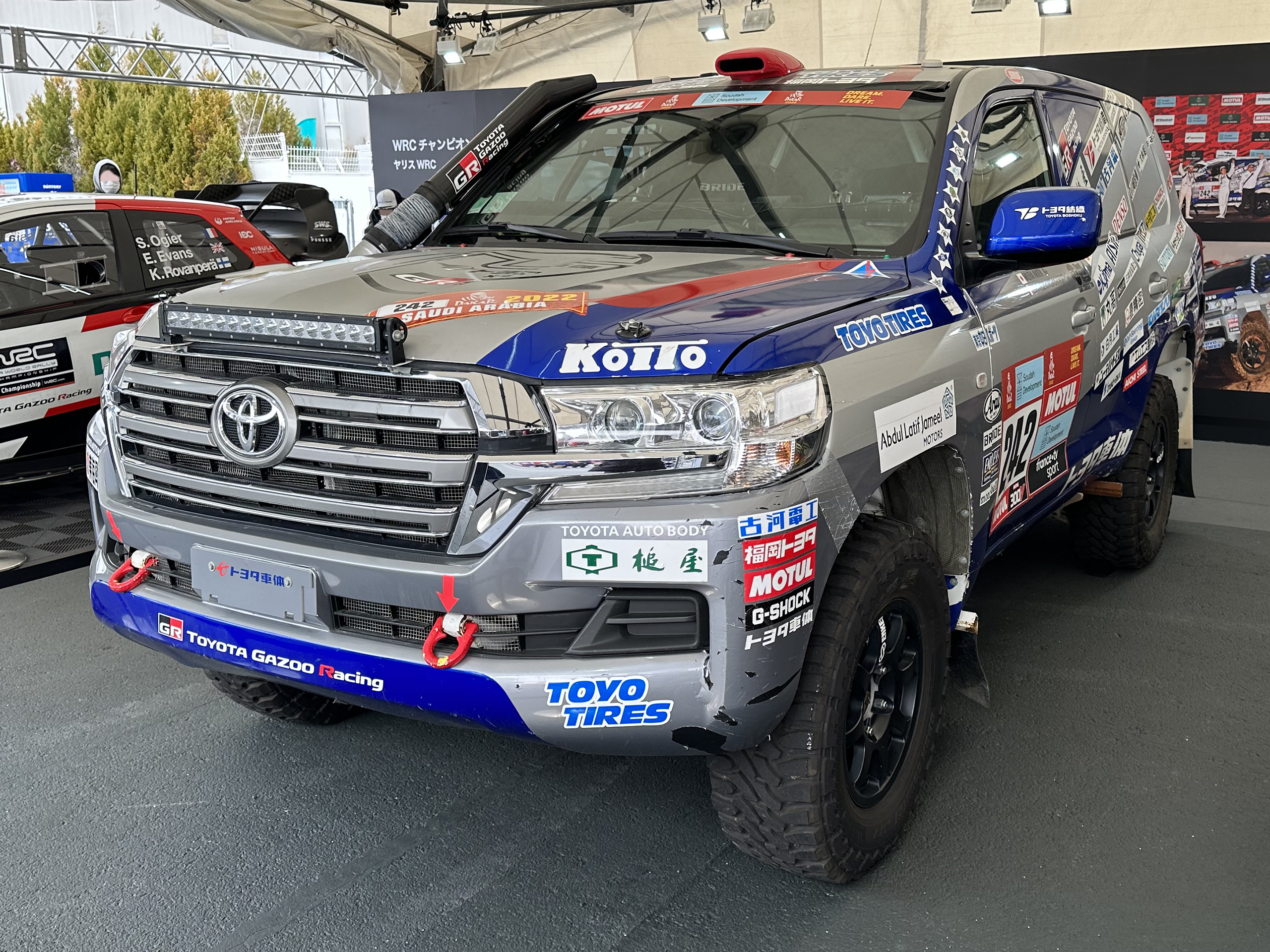
J200 Land Cruiser raced by Team Land Cruiser Toyota Auto Body in the Dakar Rally

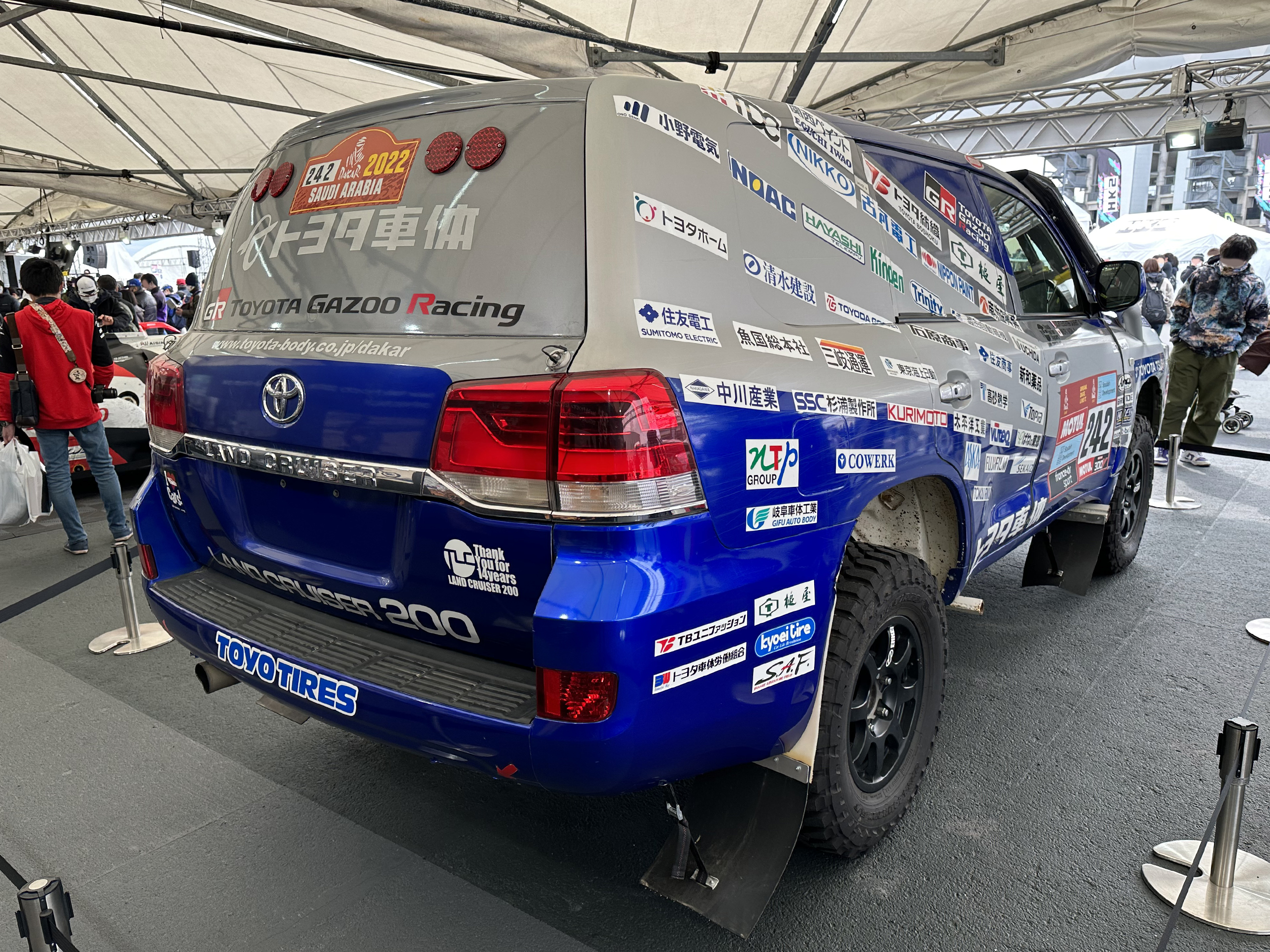
Rear view

==== Gallery ====
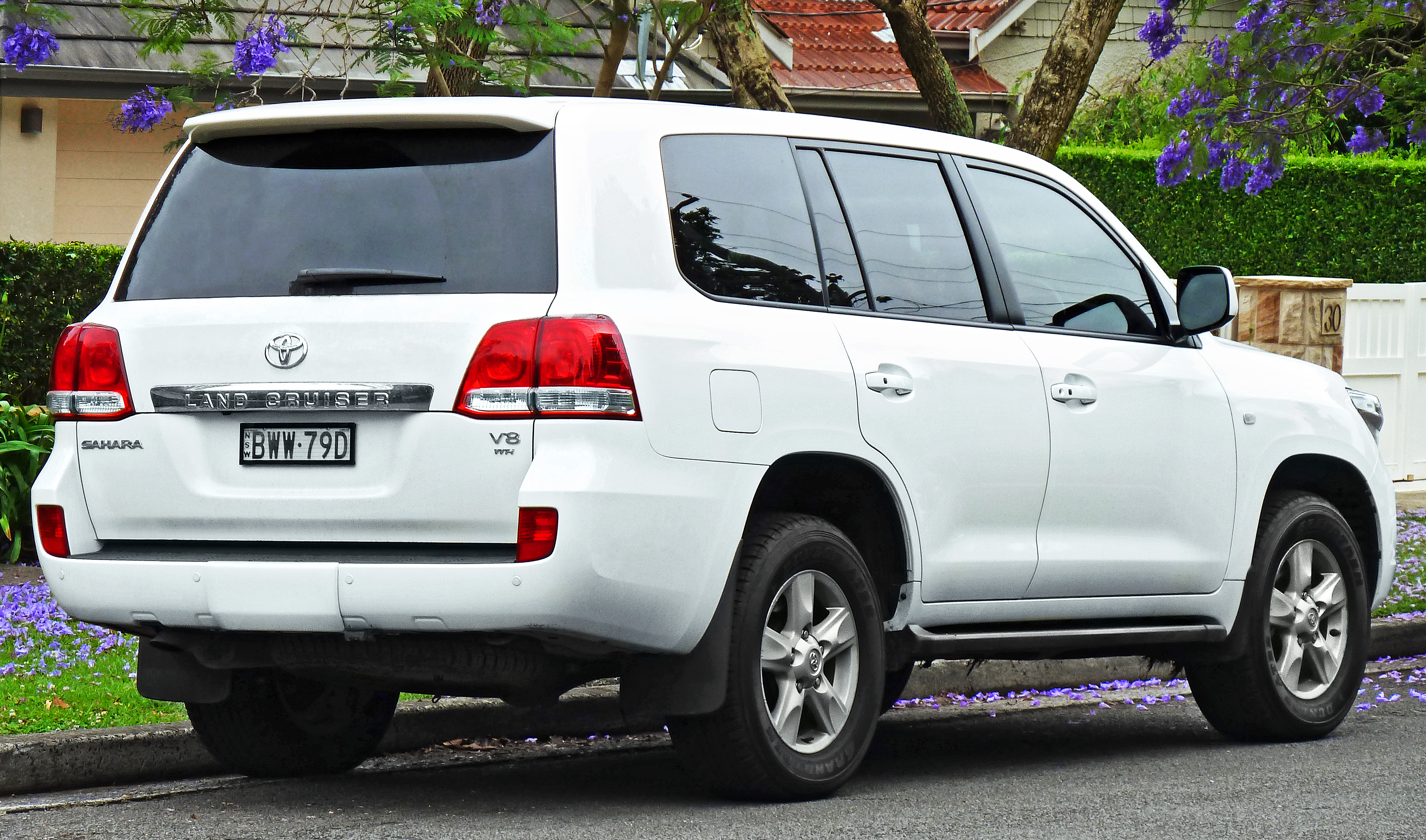
Pre-facelift Toyota Land Cruiser Sahara (UZJ200)

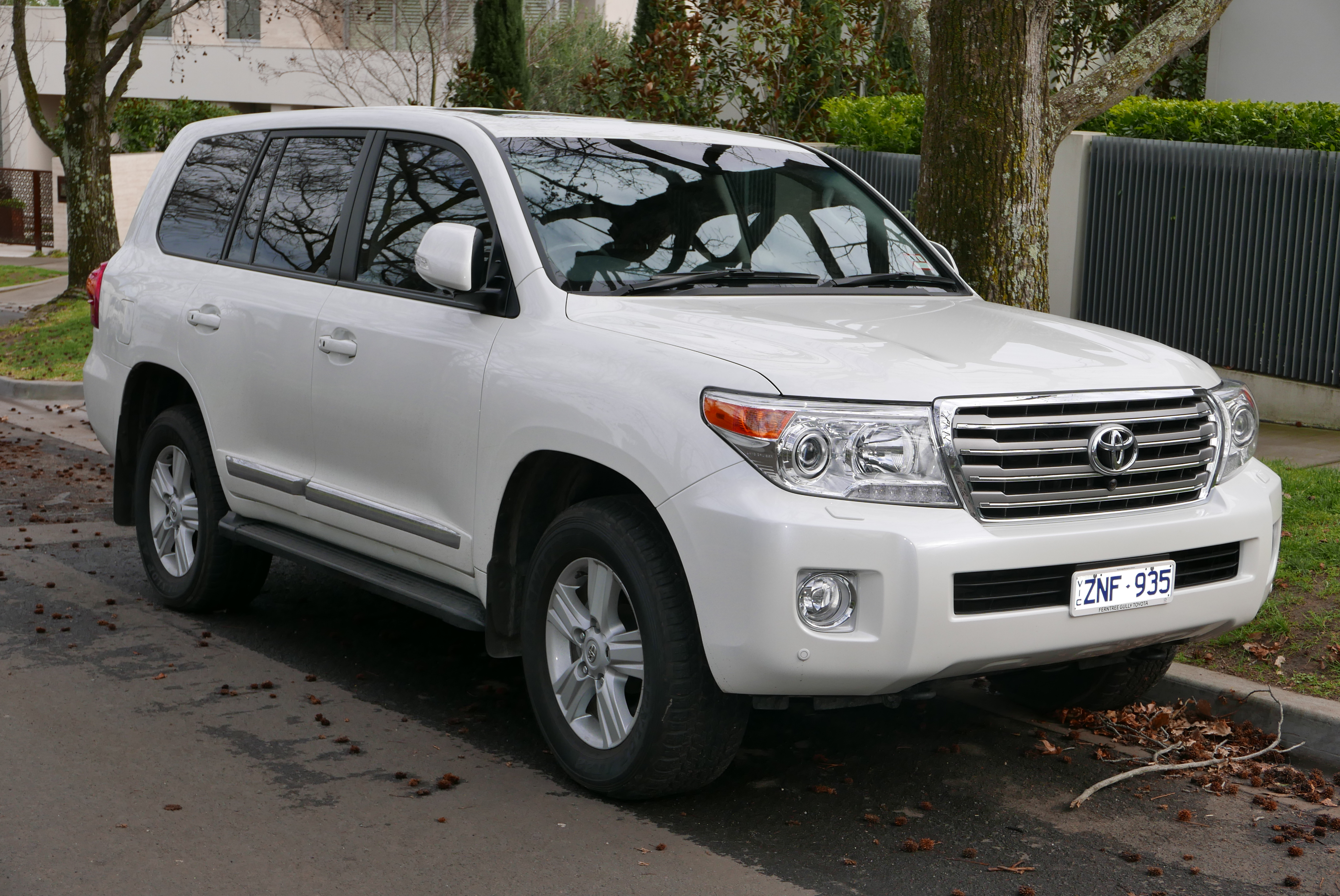
First facelift Toyota Land Cruiser Sahara (VDJ200)

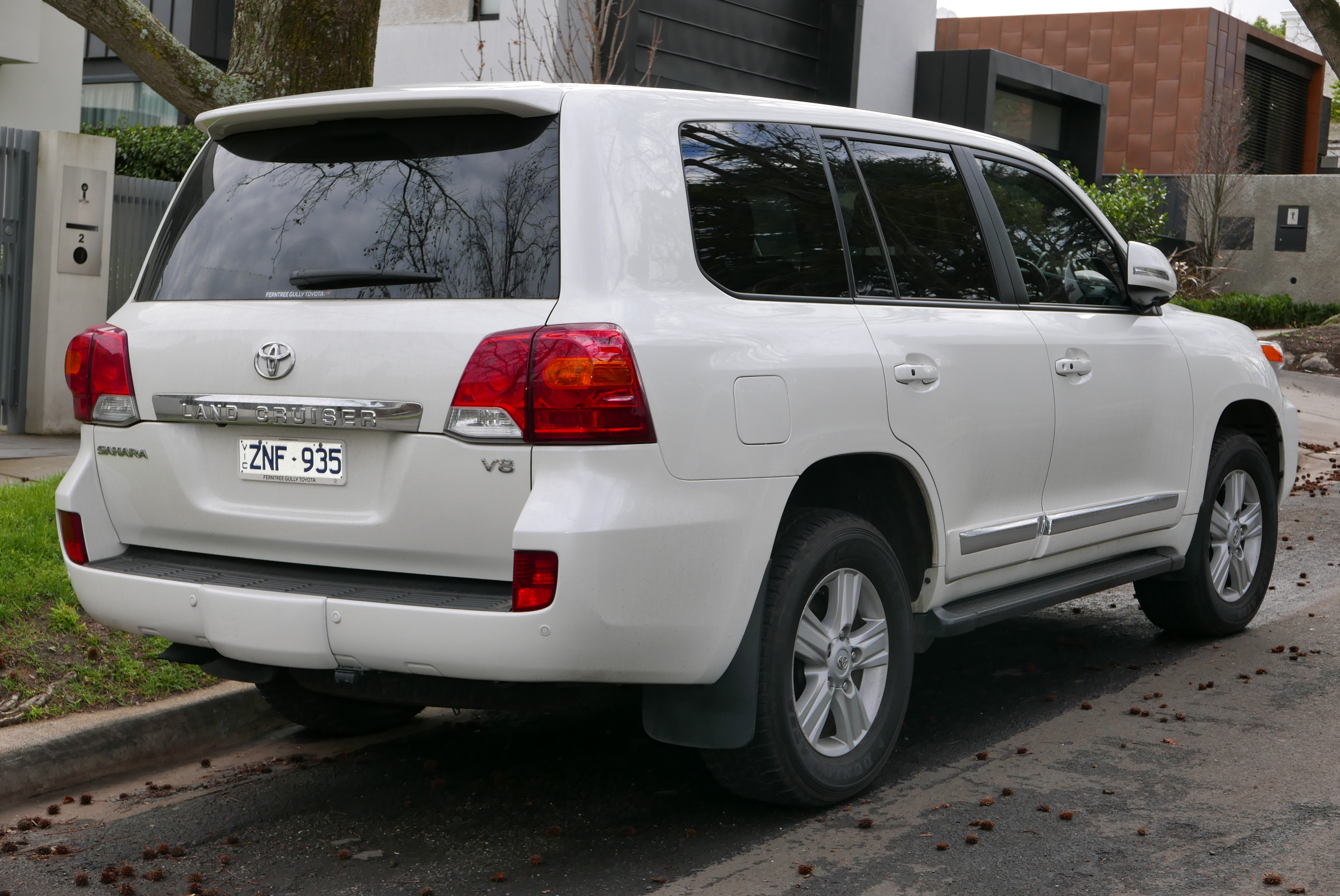
First facelift Toyota Land Cruiser Sahara (VDJ200)

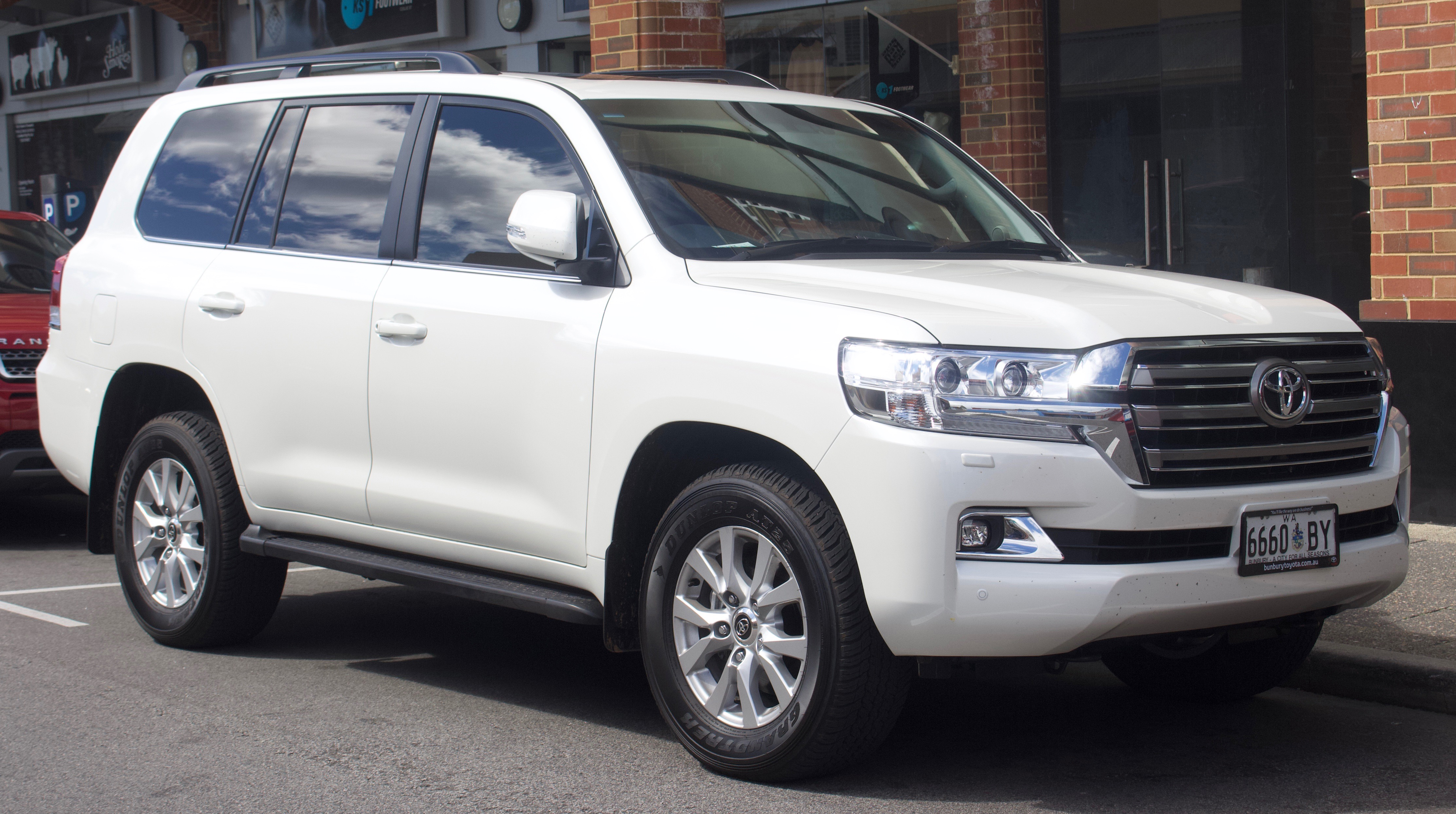
Second facelift Toyota Land Cruiser VX (VDJ200)

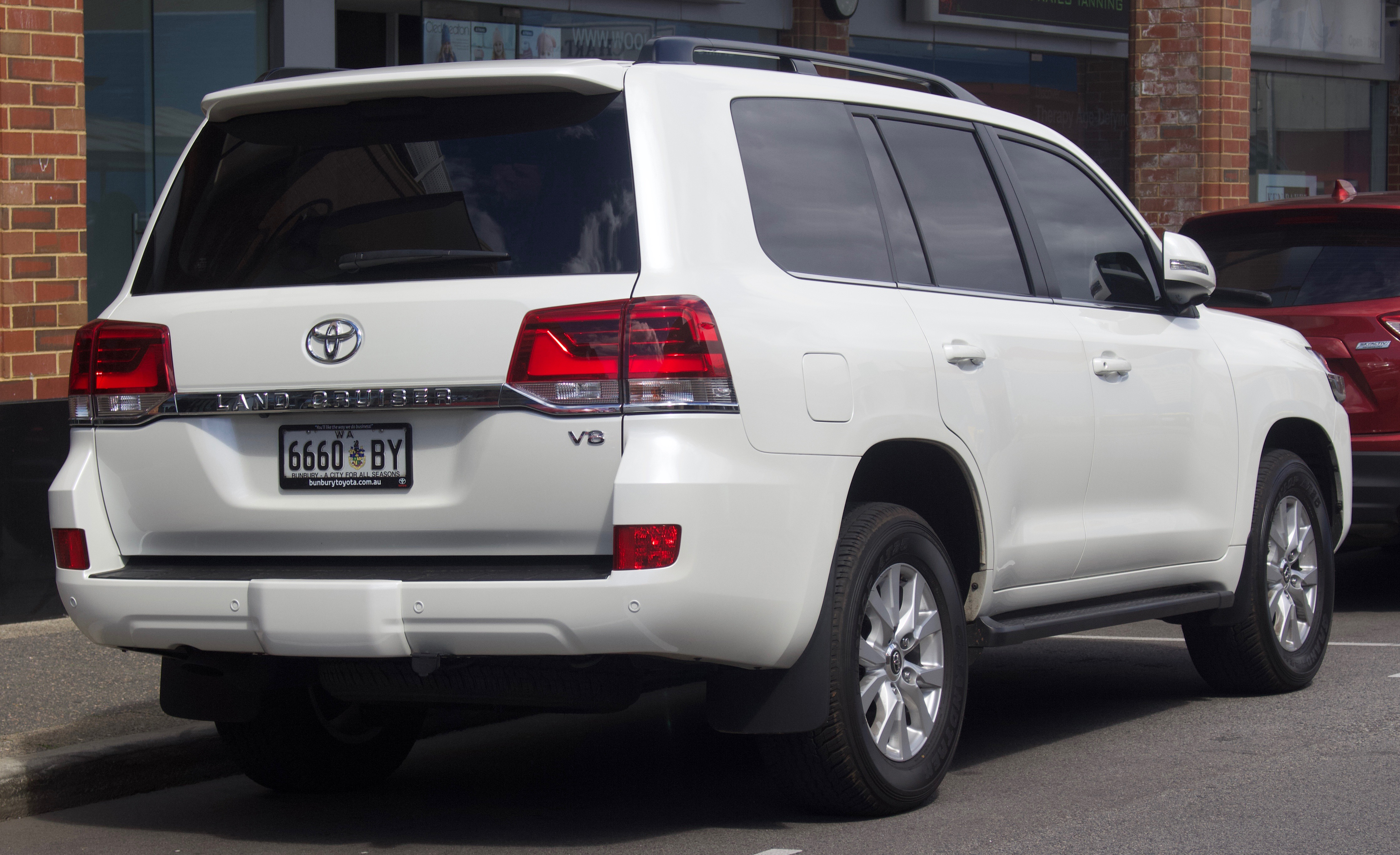
Second facelift Toyota Land Cruiser VX (VDJ200)

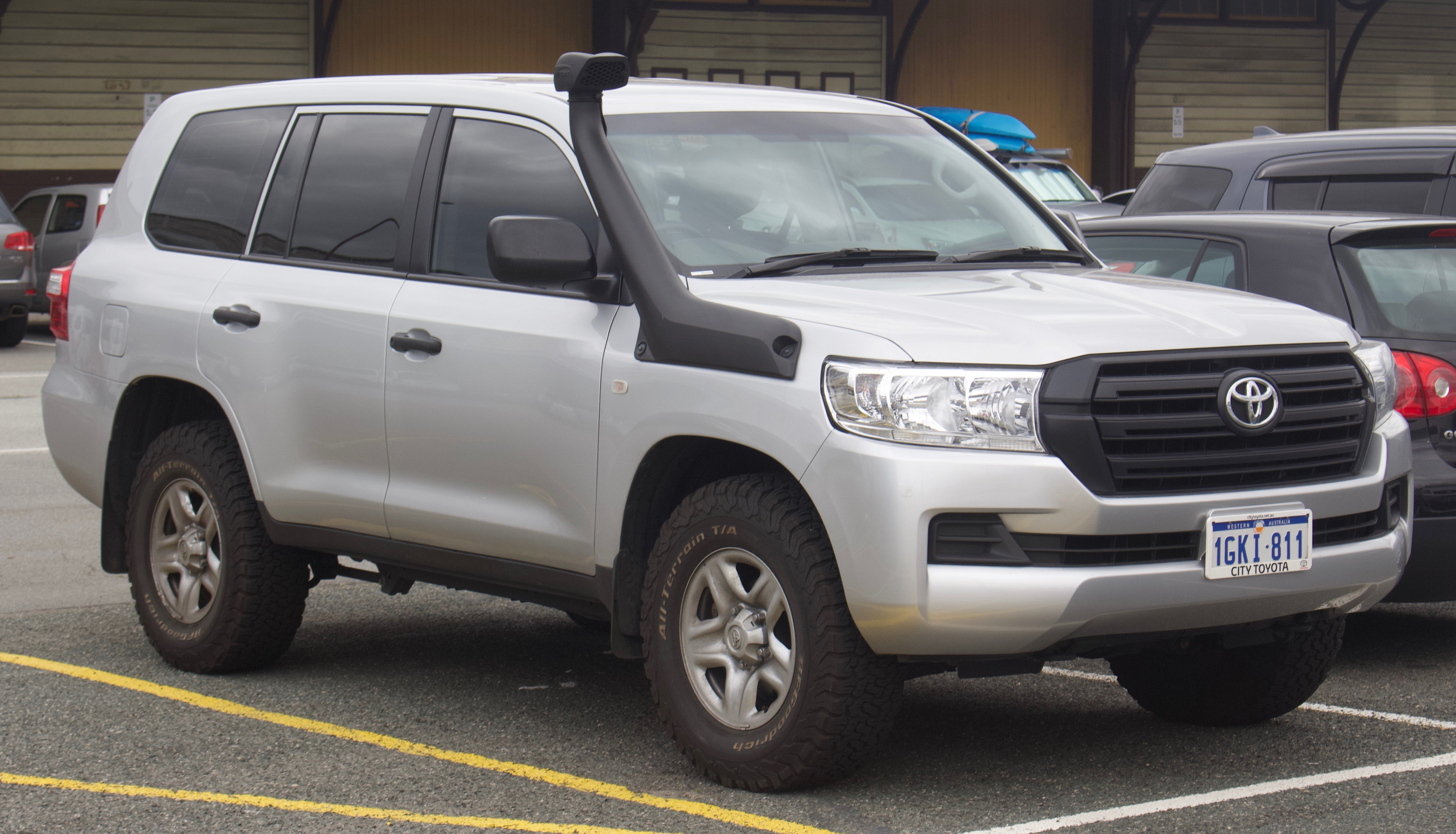
Second facelift Toyota Land Cruiser GX (VDJ200)

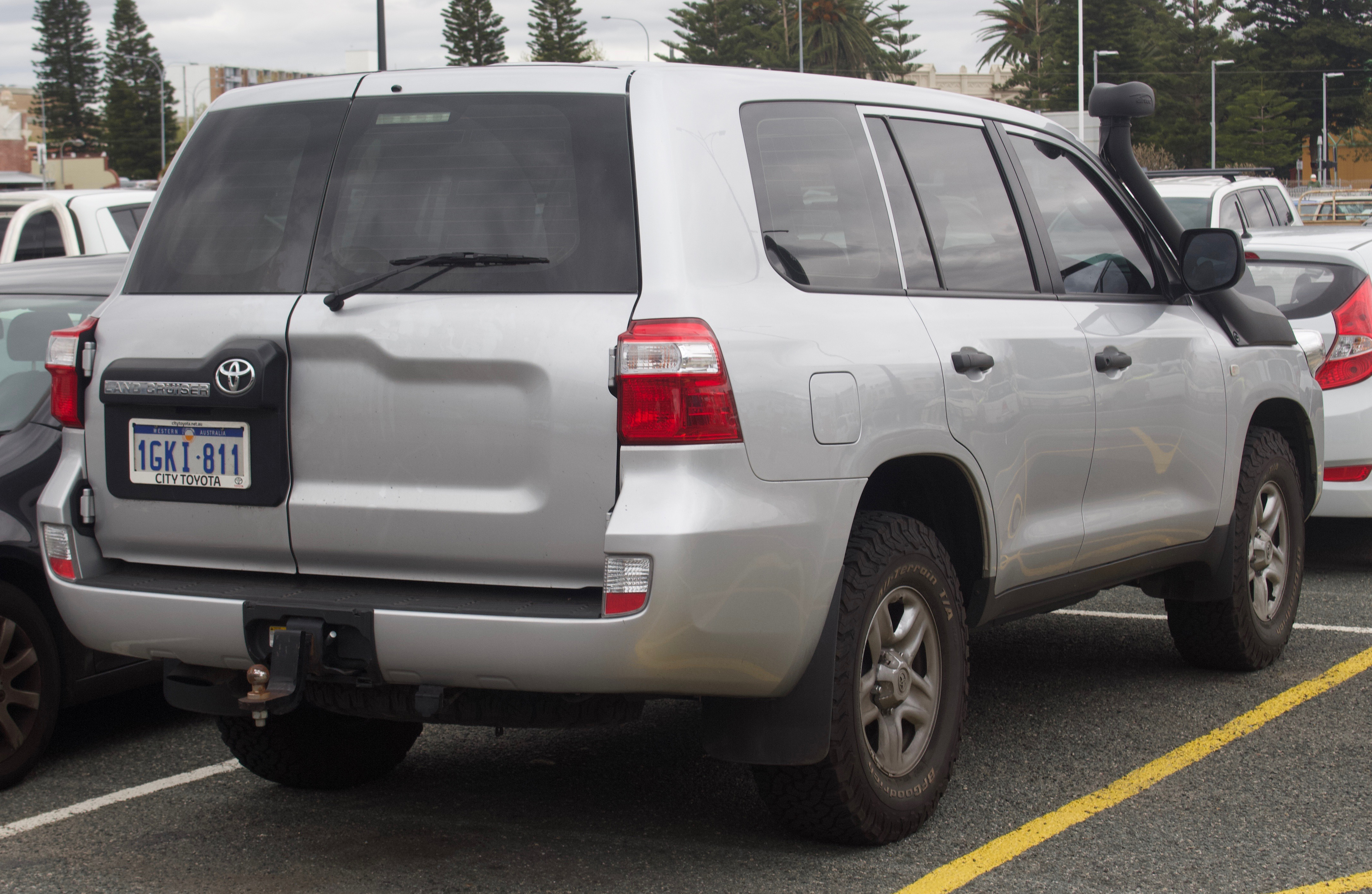
Second facelift Toyota Land Cruiser GX (VDJ200)

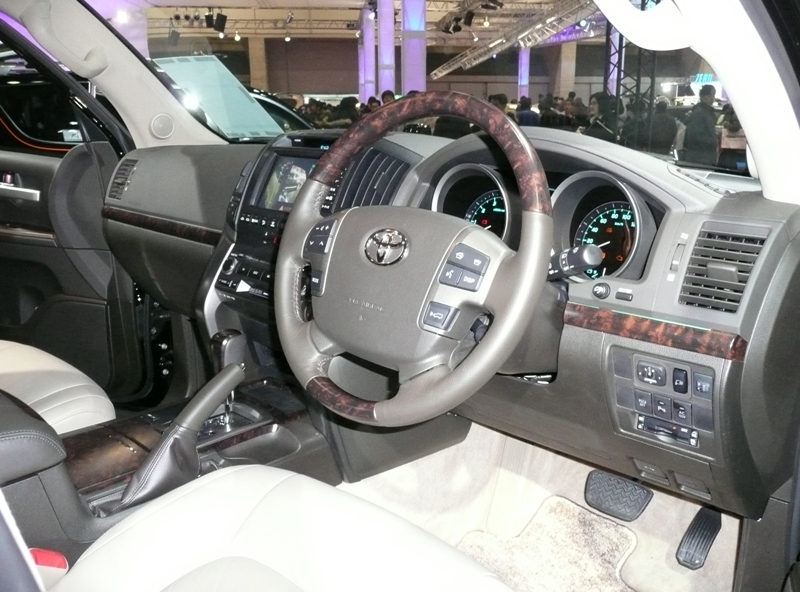
Interior (pre-facelift)

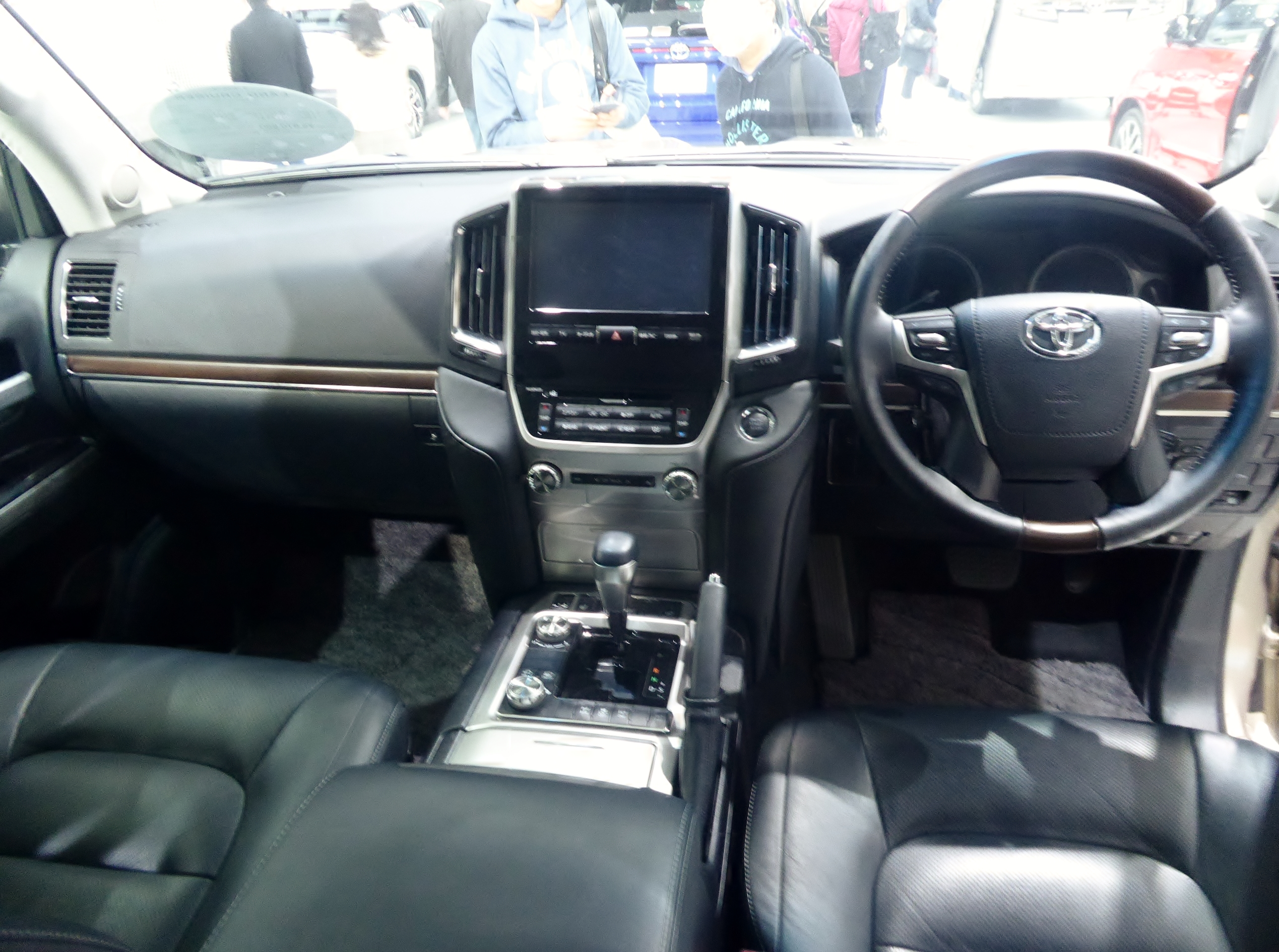
Interior (second facelift)

==== Safety ====
ANCAP test results* Toyota Land Cruiser GX and GXL variants (2011)
| Test | Score |
|---|---|
| Overall | 4 /5 stars |
| Frontal offset | 11.09/16 |
| Side impact | 16/16 |
| Pole | 2/2 |
| Seat belt reminders | 2/3 |
| Whiplash protection | Marginal |
| Pedestrian protection | Marginal |
| Electronic stability control | Standard |

ANCAP test results* Toyota Land Cruiser VX and Sahara variants (2011)
| Test | Score |
|---|---|
| Overall | 5 /5 stars |
| Frontal offset | 13.09/16 |
| Side impact | 16/16 |
| Pole | 2/2 |
| Seat belt reminders | 2/3 |
| Whiplash protection | Marginal |
| Pedestrian protection | Marginal |
| Electronic stability control | Standard |

ANCAP test results* Toyota Land Cruiser all variants (2011)
| Test | Score |
|---|---|
| Overall | 5 /5 stars |
| Frontal offset | 13.09/16 |
| Side impact | 16/16 |
| Pole | 2/2 |
| Seat belt reminders | 2/3 |
| Whiplash protection | Marginal |
| Pedestrian protection | Marginal |
| Electronic stability control | Standard |

ANCAP test results* Toyota Land Cruiser all 200 Series variants (2011)
| Test | Score |
|---|---|
| Overall | 5 /5 stars |
| Frontal offset | 13.09/16 |
| Side impact | 16/16 |
| Pole | 2/2 |
| Seat belt reminders | 2/3 |
| Whiplash protection | Marginal |
| Pedestrian protection | Marginal |
| Electronic stability control | Standard |

=== J300 (2021) ===
J300
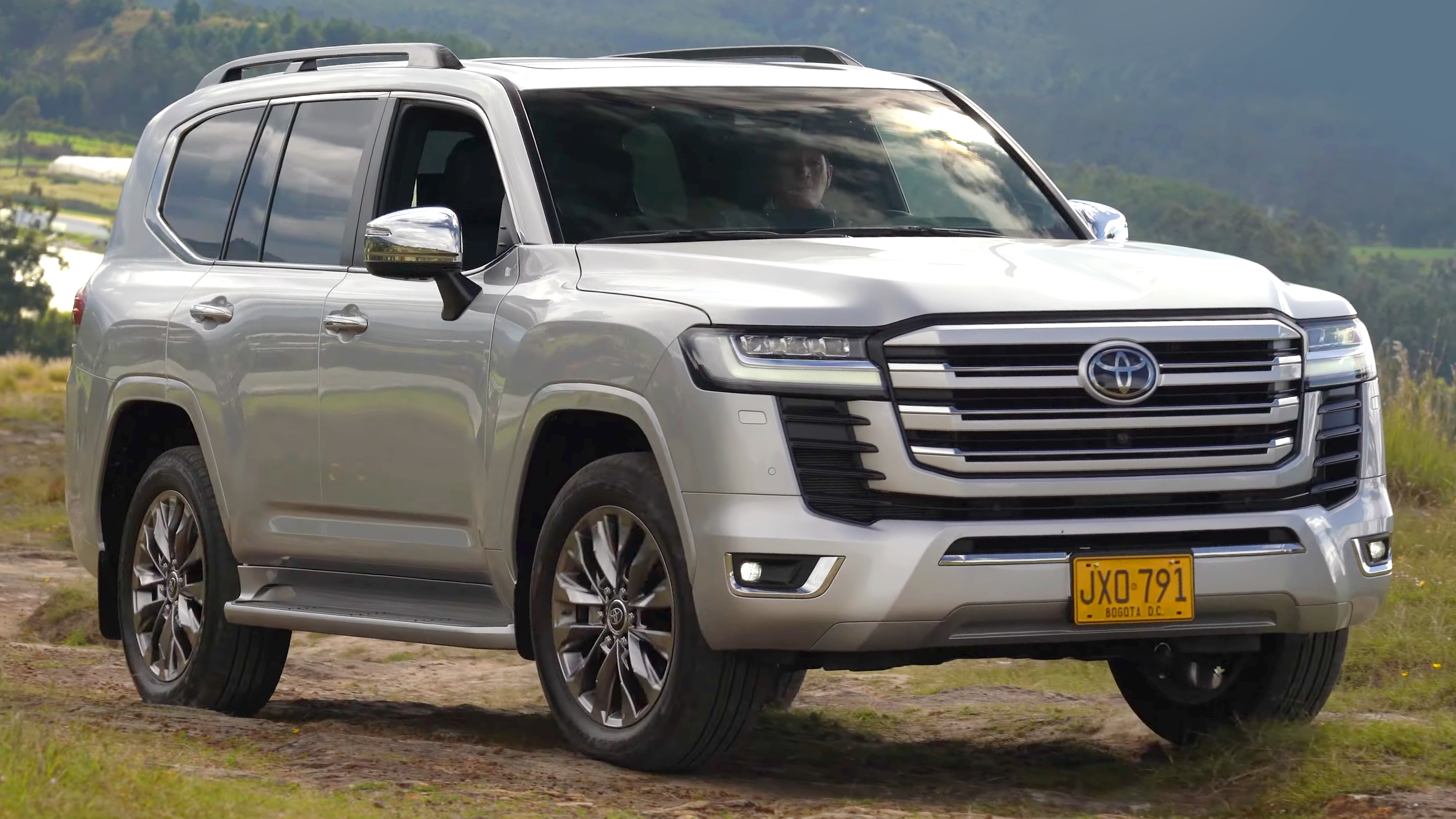
- 2021 Toyota Land Cruiser ZX (VJA300)

Overview
- Production: March 2021 – present
- Assembly: Japan: Toyota, Aichi (Yoshiwara plant); Tahara, Aichi (Tahara plant)
- Designer: List: Masaki Okue, Masanori Kinoshita, Takeshi Ogawa, Hironami Haga, and Hisayuki Tashiro; Mineo Imaiida and Kazunori Ueda (GR Sport)

Body and chassis
- Body style: 5-door SUV
- Layout: Front-engine, four-wheel-drive
- Platform: TNGA: GA-F
- Related: Lexus LX (J310); Toyota Land Cruiser (J250); Lexus GX (J250); Toyota Sequoia (XK80); Toyota Tundra (XK70)

Powertrain
- Engine: Petrol: 3.4 L V35A-FTS twin-turbo V6 (VJA300); 4.0 L 1GR-FE Dual VVT-i V6 (GRJ300); Petrol hybrid: 3.4 L V35A-FTS twin-turbo V6 (VJH300); Diesel: 3.3 L F33A-FTV twin-turbo V6 (FJA300)
- Power output: 305 kW (409 hp; 415 PS) (V35A-FTS); 201 kW (270 hp; 273 PS) (1GR-FE); 341 kW (457 hp; 464 PS) (V35A-FTS hybrid); 220–227 kW (295–304 hp; 299–309 PS) (F33A-FTV)
- Transmission: 6-speed automatic (GRJ300) AC60F; 10-speed AWR10L65 automatic (VJA300/FJA300/VJH300)
- Hybrid drivetrain: Parallel

Dimensions
- Wheelbase: 2,850 mm (112.2 in)
- Length: 4,950–5,015 mm (194.9–197.4 in)
- Width: 1,980–1,990 mm (78.0–78.3 in)
- Height: 1,945 mm (76.6 in)
- Curb weight: 2,310–2,645 kg (5,093–5,831 lb)

==== Development ====
The J300 series Land Cruiser was unveiled on 9 June 2021. Its development was led by Toyota chief engineer Takami Yokoo. Built on the body-on-frame GA-F platform, the frame itself was redesigned to reduce weight and increase rigidity. The total weight of the vehicle was reduced by 200 kg (441 lb) compared to its predecessor. Other improvements claimed include lowered center of gravity, weight distribution, and an improved suspension structure.

==== Specifications ====
Exterior dimensions including the total length, total width, and wheelbase, as well as both the departure and approach angles have been kept largely same as the previous model to retain its off-road performance. It carries over the approach angle of 32 degrees from its predecessor. The departure angle can reach up to 26.5 degrees depending on the version, while ground clearance measures 230 mm (9.1 in). Toyota has equipped the vehicle with an adaptive variable suspension (AVS), an upgraded Electronic Kinetic Dynamic Suspension System (E-KDSS), a more advanced Multi-Terrain Select system with Deep Snow and Auto modes, and a Multi-Terrain Monitor system which incorporates an underbody camera.

For this generation, Toyota ceased to offer V8 engine options in favour of a 3.4-litre V35A-FTS twin-turbocharged V6 petrol engine producing 305 kW (409 hp; 415 PS) and 649 N⋅m (479 lb⋅ft), and a 3.3-litre F33A-FTV twin-turbocharged V6 diesel engine producing 227 kW (304 hp; 308 PS) and 700 N⋅m (516 lb⋅ft). A 4.0-litre naturally aspirated V6 engine is carried over from the previous model.

A GR Sport/GR-S variant is also available for the first time. It is 5 mm (0.2 in) shorter than the standard model, and uses more body adhesive to enhance structural rigidity. The GR Sport model also offers front and rear differential locking, as opposed to only centre locking in the standard 300 Series.

==== Markets ====
===== Japan =====
The Japanese model went on sale on 2 August 2021. It was available in four 7-seat petrol grades: AX, VX, GR Sport and ZX, one 5-seat petrol grade: GX and two 5-seat diesel grades: GR Sport and ZX.

Toyota introduced the updated Land Cruiser 300 series and introduced a hybrid model for Japanese market on 1 October 2026. The available variants for the 3.5 L hybrid model are ZX and GR Sport. For the 3.3-litre diesel engine option, available variants are ZX, GR Sport and GX. The hybrid model has 7 seats, while the diesel engine model has 5 seats.

===== Other =====
It went on sale in the United Arab Emirates and Kuwait on 20 June 2021, in the Philippines on 7 September 2021, in South Africa on 30 July 2021, in Australia on 5 October 2021, and in Indonesia on 13 January 2022. The South African model is available in three grades: GX-R, ZS and GR Sport. The Australian model is available in six grades: GX, GXL, VX, Sahara, GR Sport and Sahara ZX. The Indonesian model is available in two grades: VX-R and GR-S. The Philippine model is available in two grades: VX and ZX. The Middle Eastern model is available in six grades: GX, EX-R, GX-R, VX, VX-R and GR Sport. The Sri Lankan model is available in three grades ZX, VX and GR Sport

The J300 series Land Cruiser is not sold in the United States and Canada due to slow sales for its J200 series predecessor, as well as limited production capacity; the related Lexus LX remains available. In those markets, the J200 series was partially replaced by the slightly smaller J250 series in 2024.

==== Hybrid ====
Hybrid powertrains were introduced to the Land Cruiser lineup in the 2025 as part of Toyota's shift toward lower-emission drivetrains.

The hybrid variant was debuted in the UAE with a redesigned front fascia.

==== Engines ====
| Engine | Power | Torque | Years |
|---|---|---|---|
| F33A-FTV V6 3,345 cc (204.1 cu in) | 227 kW (304 hp) at 4,000 rpm | 700 N⋅m (516 lbf⋅ft) at 1,600-2,600 rpm | 2022–present |
| V35A-FTS V6 3,445 cc (210.2 cu in) | 305 kW (409 hp) at 5,200 rpm | 650 N⋅m (479 lbf⋅ft) at 2,000-3,600 rpm | 2021–present |
| V35A-FTS V6 3,445 cc (210.2 cu in) | 341 kW (457 hp) at 5,200 rpm | 790 N⋅m (583 lbf⋅ft) at 2,000-3,600 rpm | 2024–present |
| 1GR-FE V6 3,956 cc (241.4 cu in) | 202 kW (271 hp) at 5,600 rpm | 385 N⋅m (284 lbf⋅ft) at 4,400 rpm | 2021–present |

==== Gallery ====
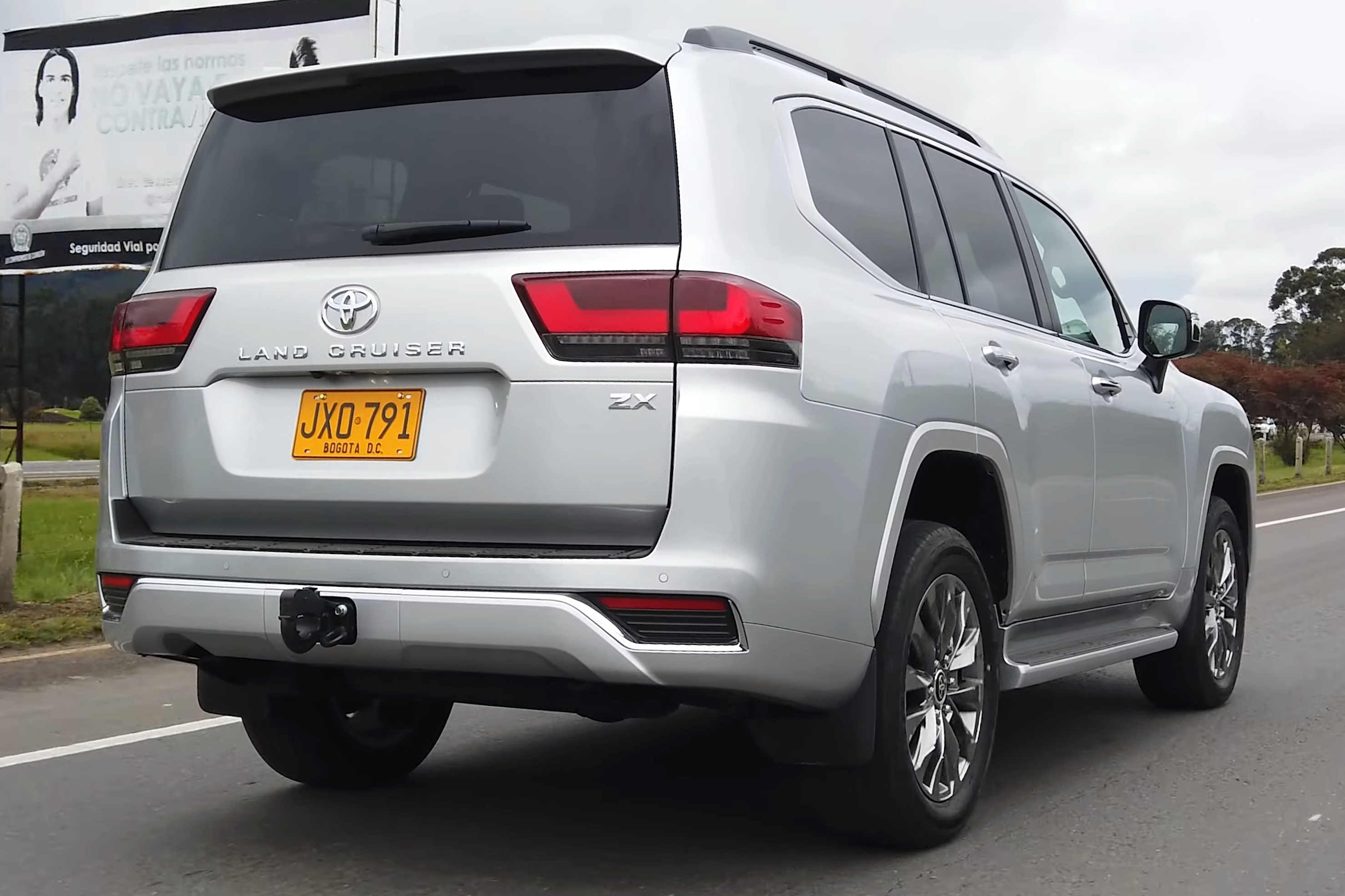
2021 Land Cruiser ZX (rear)

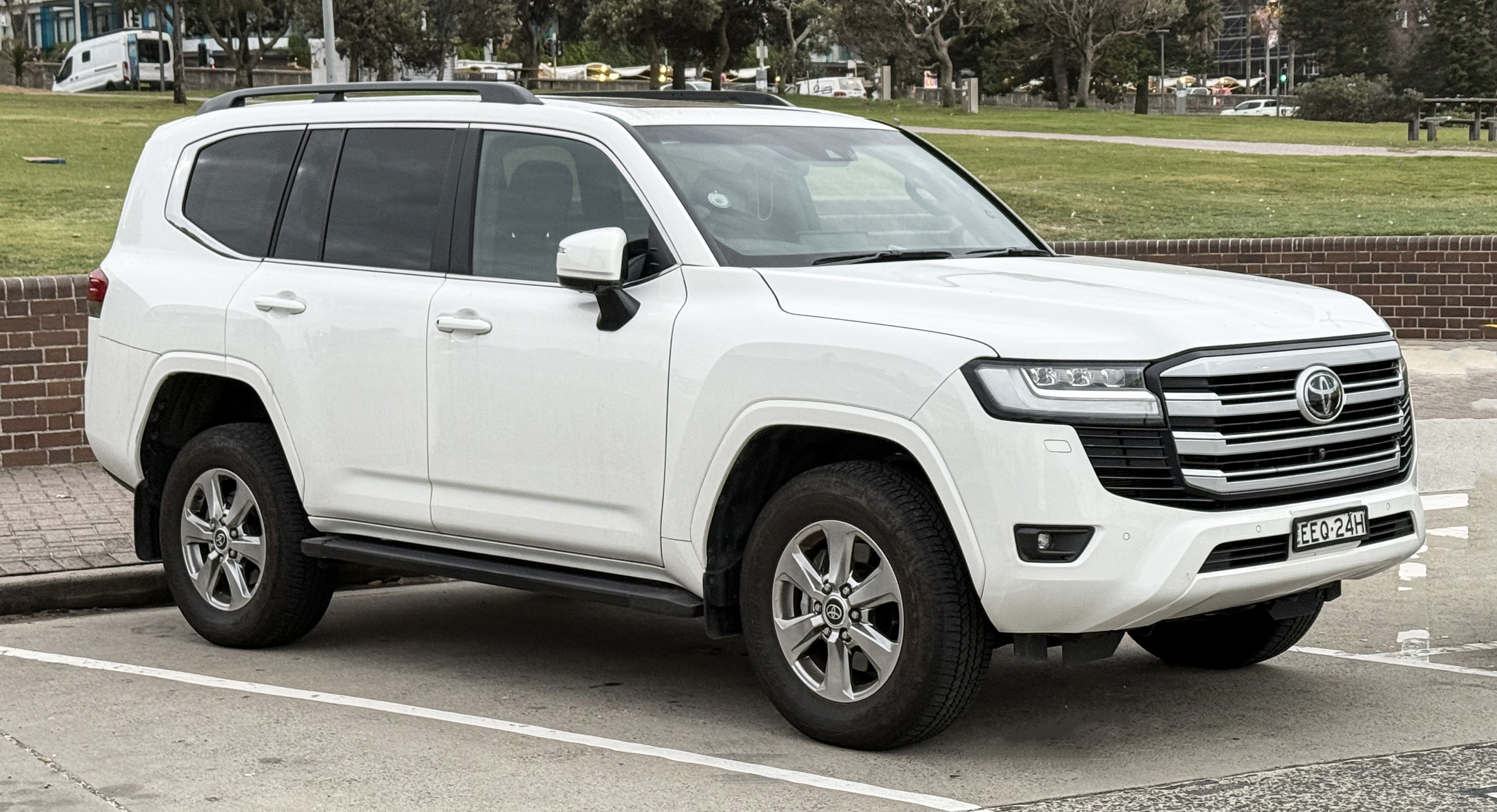
2024 Land Cruiser VX

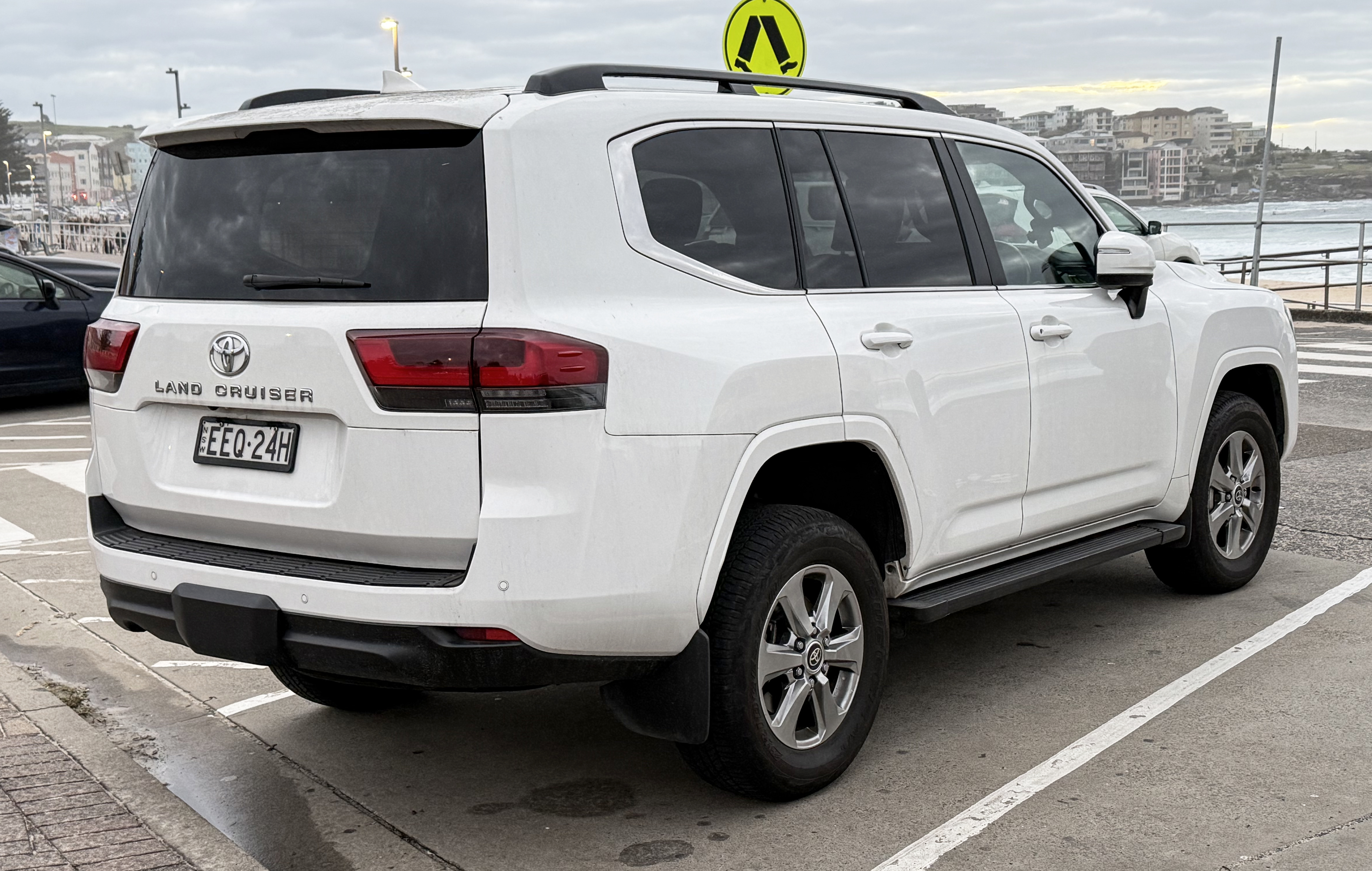
2024 Land Cruiser VX (rear)

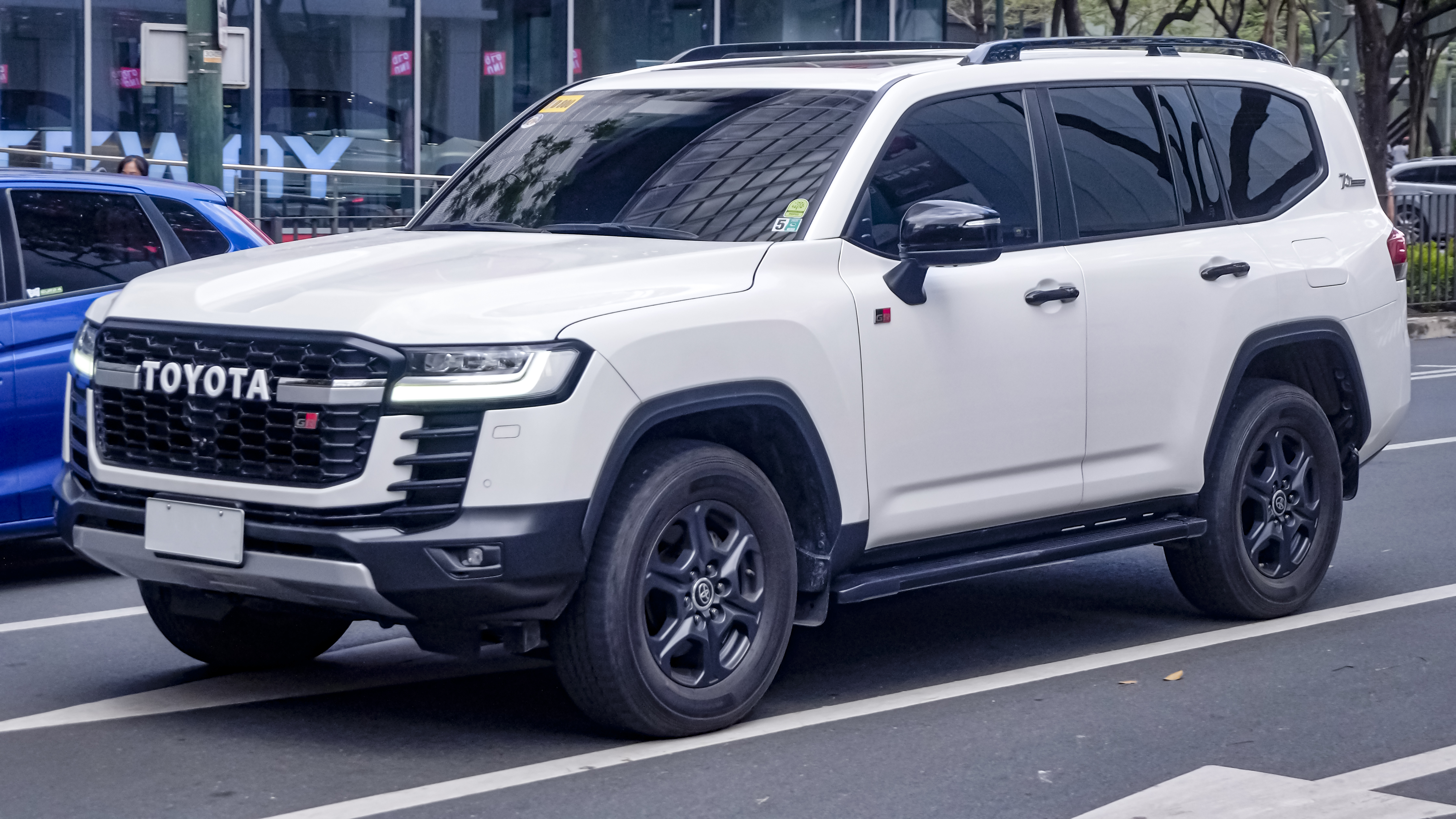
2021 Land Cruiser GR Sport

2022 Land Cruiser GR Sport (rear)

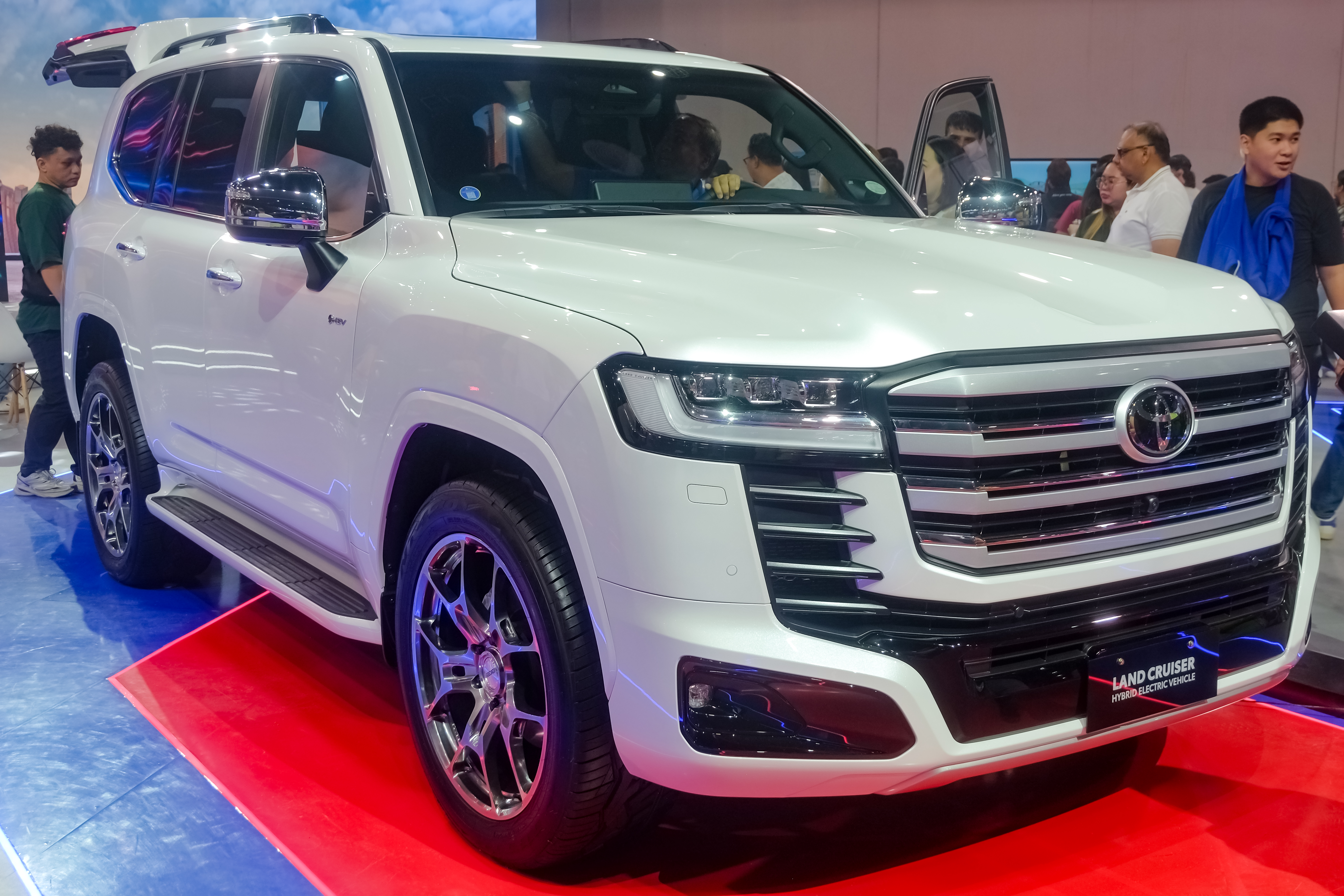
2025 Land Cruiser ZX HEV (with non-standard wheels)

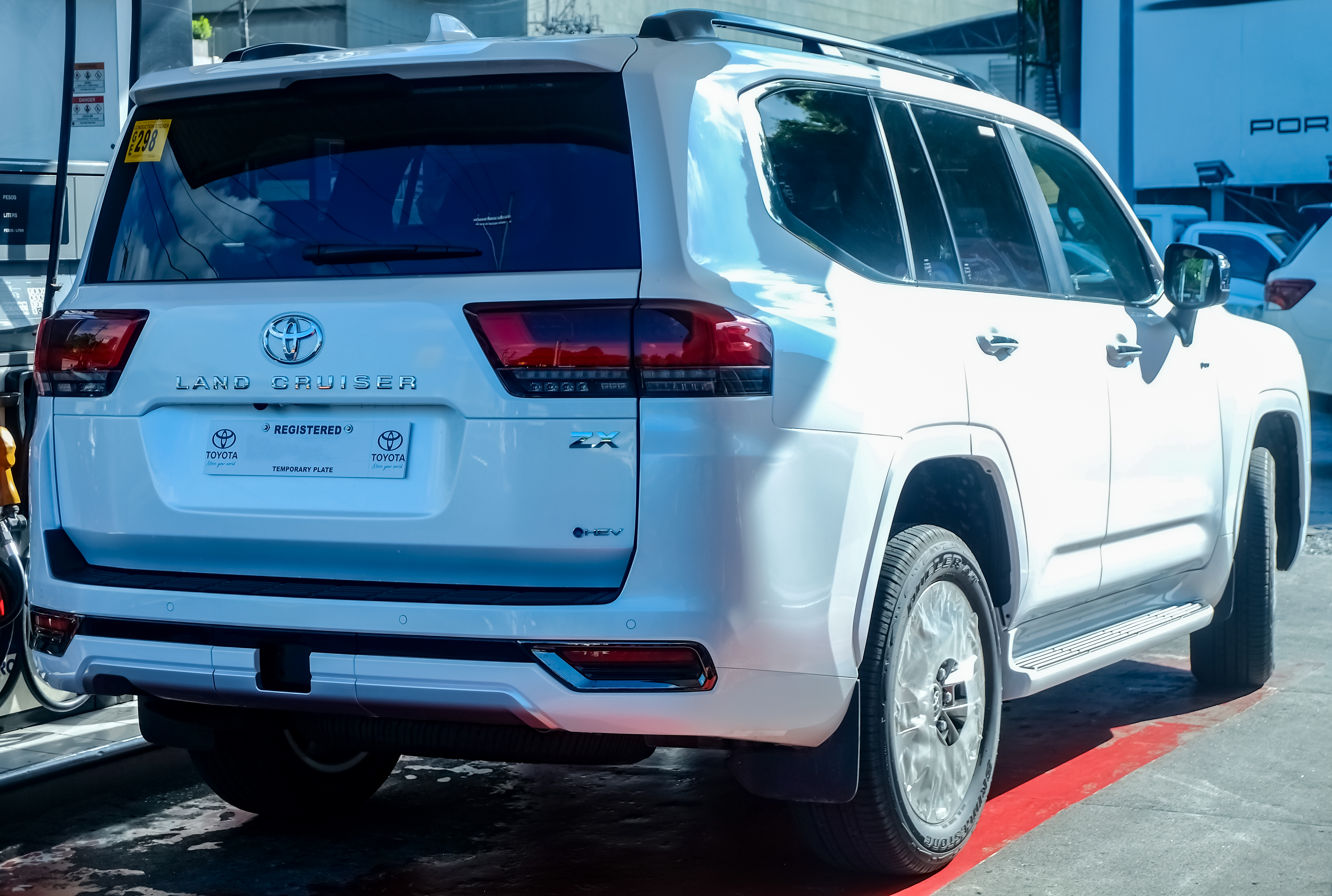
2025 Land Cruiser ZX HEV (rear view)

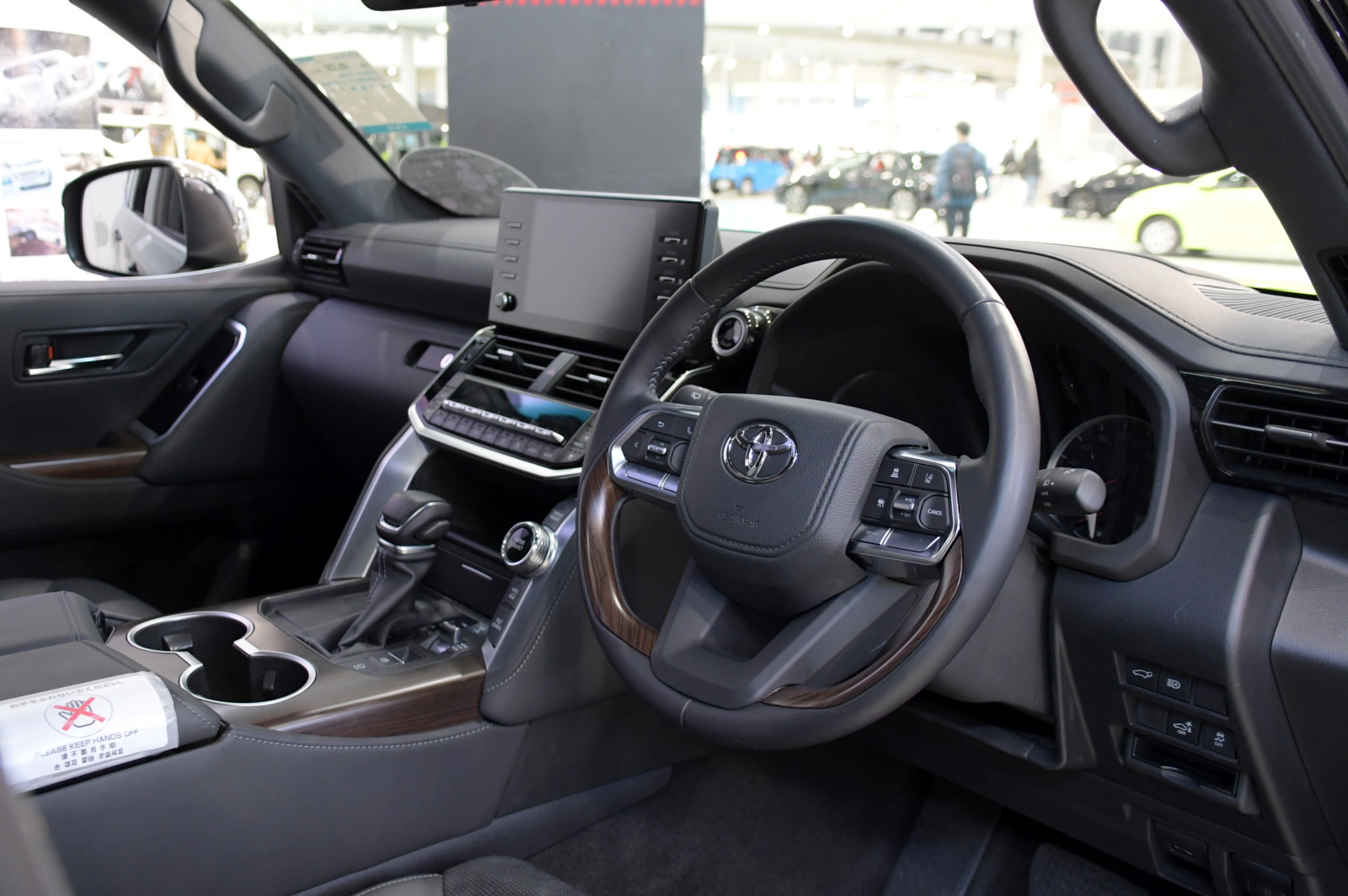
Interior

==== Safety ====
ANCAP test results Toyota Landcruiser all 300 Series variants (excluding GR Sport) (2022, aligned with Euro NCAP)
| Test | Points | % |
|---|---|---|
| Overall: | 5 /5 stars | |
| Adult occupant: | 34.08 | 89% |
| Child occupant: | 43.60 | 88% |
| Pedestrian: | 44.02 | 81% |
| Safety assist: | 12.40 | 77% |

== Land Cruiser FJ ==
The Land Cruiser FJ is a model slotted below the Prado. This model was introduced in October 2025, and went on sale in 2026. It is built upon the IMV platform shared with the Hilux.

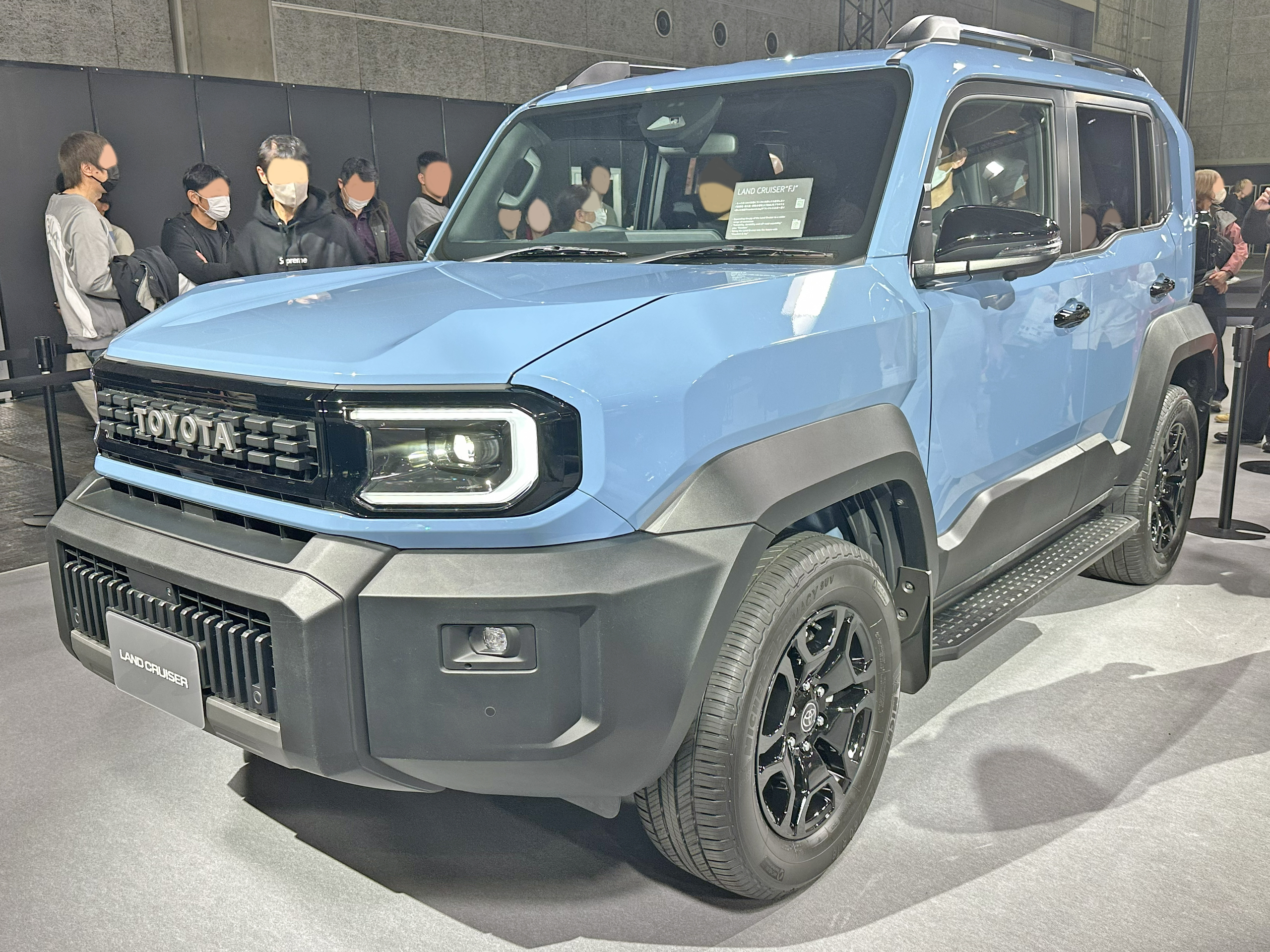
Land Cruiser FJ prototype

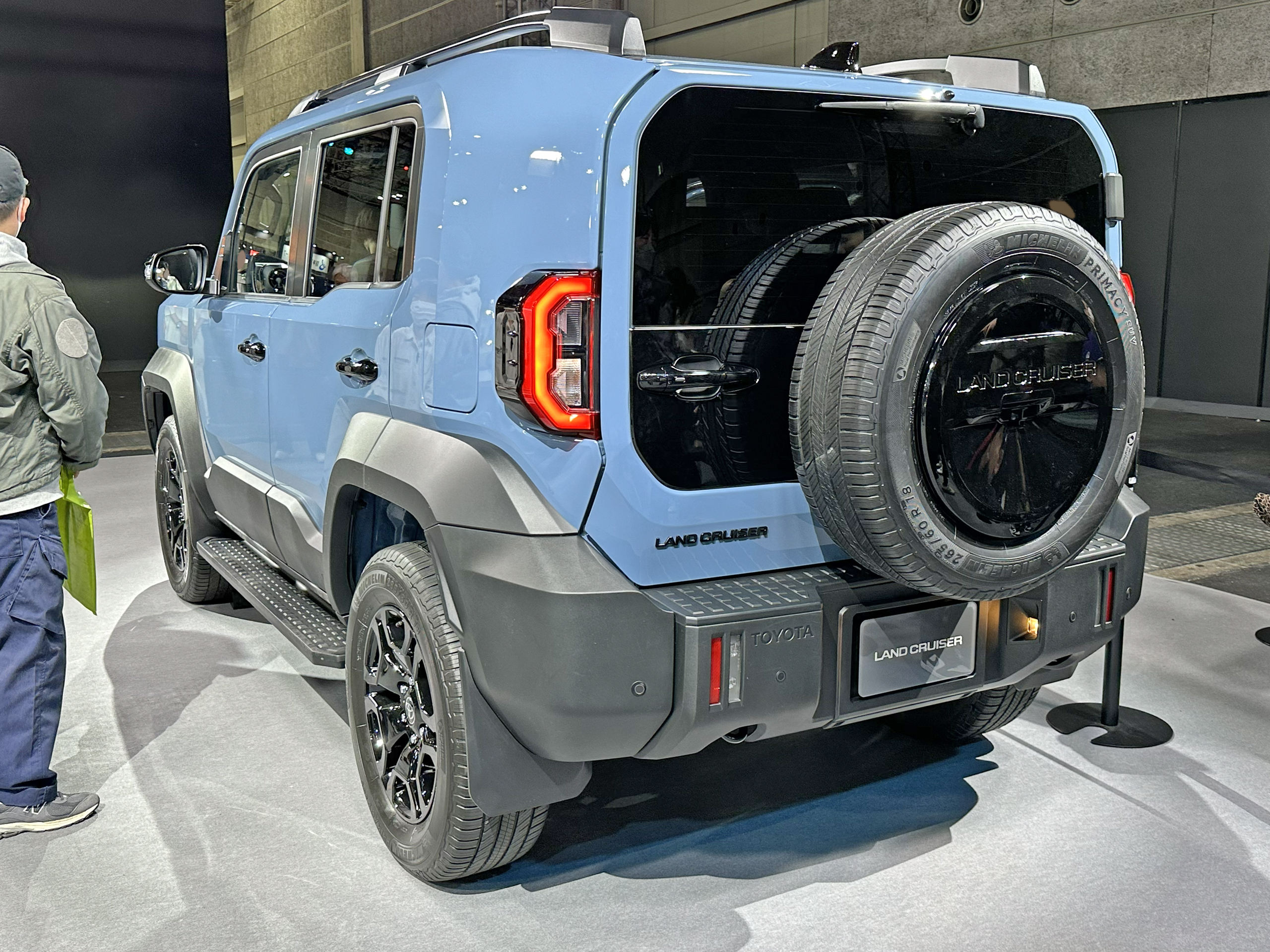
Rear view

== Land Cruiser Se Concept (2023) ==
The Land Cruiser Se is a monocoque-based three-row battery electric concept SUV using the Land Cruiser nameplate showcased at the 2023 Japan Mobility Show.

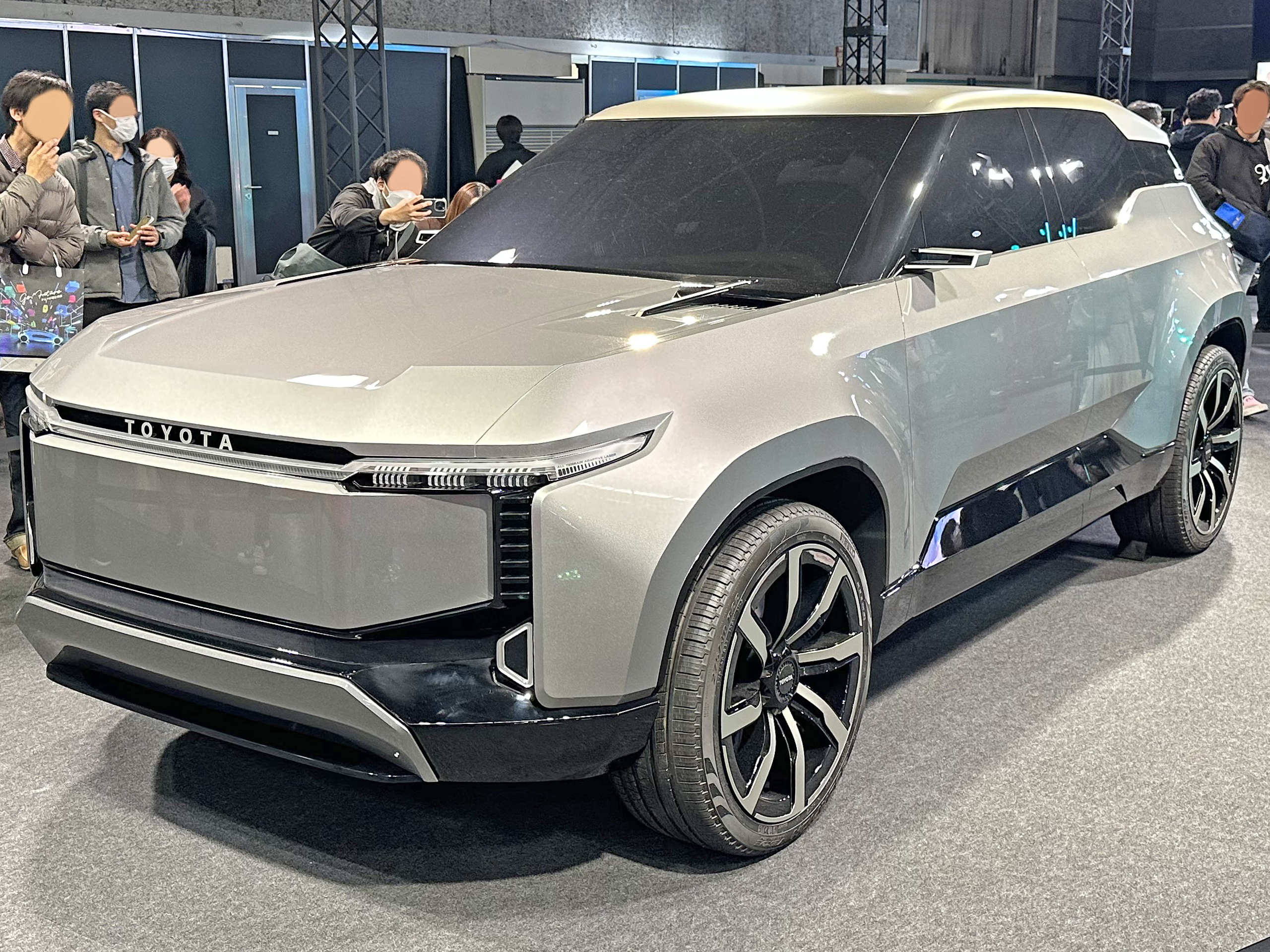
Land Cruiser Se concept (front view)

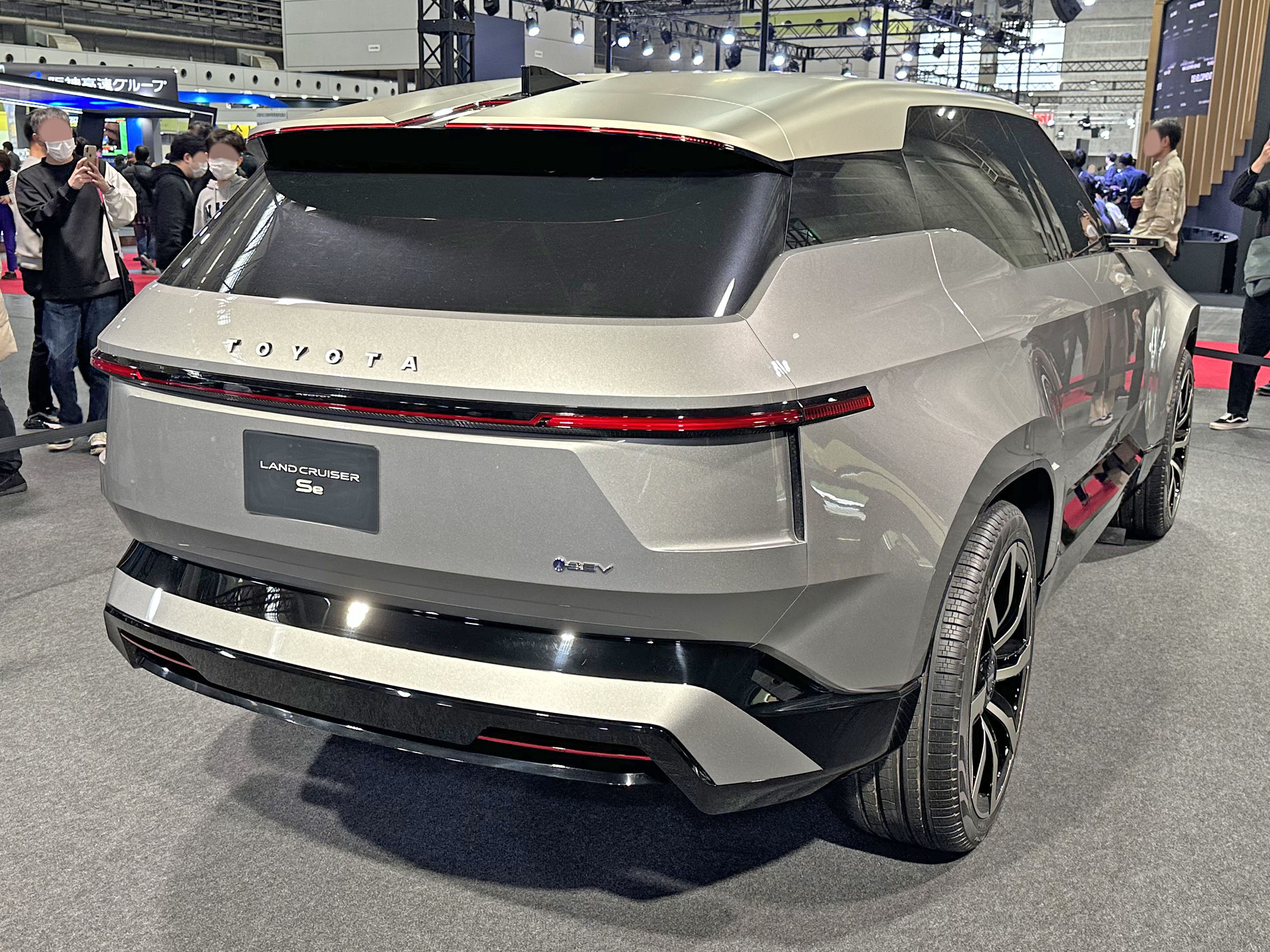
Land Cruiser Se concept (rear view)

== Sales ==
| Calendar year | Japan | Australia | United States (Note: Sales figures for the United States for calendar year 2024 and beyond are for the model based on the J250 series Land Cruiser Prado.) | China | Saudi Arabia | Malaysia (Note: Figures based on registration (Malaysia)) |
|---|---|---|---|---|---|---|
| 1999 | | | 18,602 | | | |
| 2000 | | | 15,509 | | | 1,171 |
| 2001 | | | 7,591 | | | 678 |
| 2002 | | | 6,752 | | | 671 |
| 2003 | | | 6,671 | | | 770 |
| 2004 | 4,996 | | 6,778 | | | 756 |
| 2005 | 5,895 | | 4,870 | 4,293 | | 657 |
| 2006 | 4,431 | | 3,376 | 3,149 | | 477 |
| 2007 | 4,946 | | 3,251 | 2,511 | | 792 |
| 2008 | 8,094 | | 3,898 | 4,734 | | 774 |
| 2009 | 2,772 | | 2,261 | 2,524 | | 856 |
| 2010 | 2,908 | | 1,807 | 6,149 | | 961 |
| 2011 | 3,146 | | 1,662 | 7,283 | | 1,067 |
| 2012 | 4,109 | 10,829 | 2,895 | 5,308 | | 931 |
| 2013 | 3,990 | | 3,082 | 5,246 | | 869 |
| 2014 | 3,800 | | 3,158 | 2,760 | | 852 |
| 2015 | 3,360 | 9,202 | 2,687 | 1,406 | | 712 |
| 2016 | 6,020 | 11,813 | 3,705 | 789 | | 528 |
| 2017 | 4,250 | 12,814 | 3,100 | 115 | | 408 |
| 2018 | 3,610 | 13,677 | 3,222 | | | 413 |
| 2019 | 2,650 | 13,802 | 3,536 | | | 346 |
| 2020 | 1,960 | 15,078 | 3,147 | | 7,430 | 323 |
| 2021 | 1,530 | 14,356 | 3,711 | | | 272 |
| 2022 | 35,390 | 13,152 | | | | 432 |
| 2023 | 55,263 | 15,035 | | | | 684 |
| 2024 | 51,288 | 15,257 | 29,113 | | | 1,152 |
| 2025 | | | 43,946 | | 17,172 | |

== Use by military forces and militant groups ==
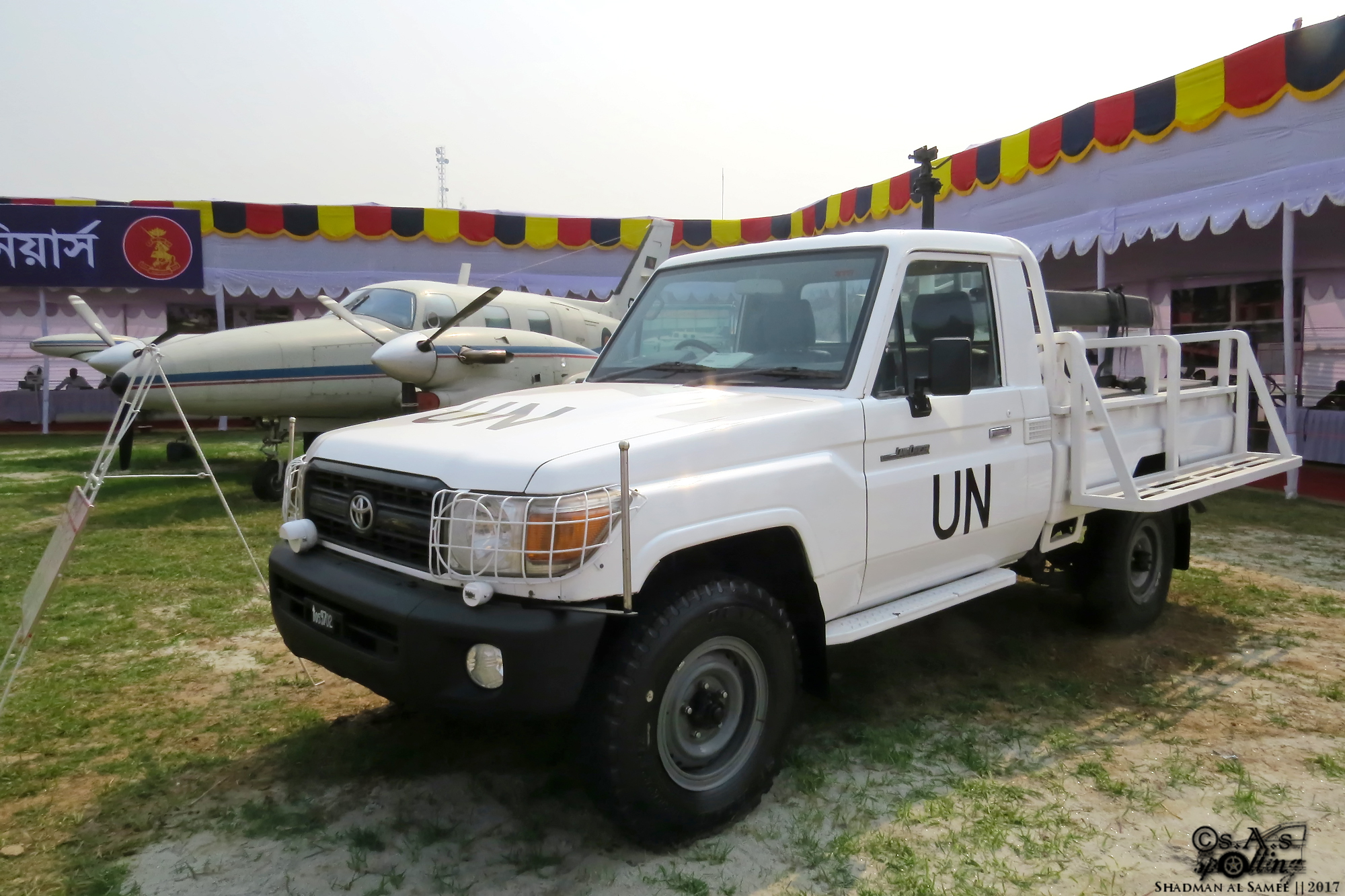
A Toyota Land Cruiser 70 "escort" pickup of the Bangladesh Army.

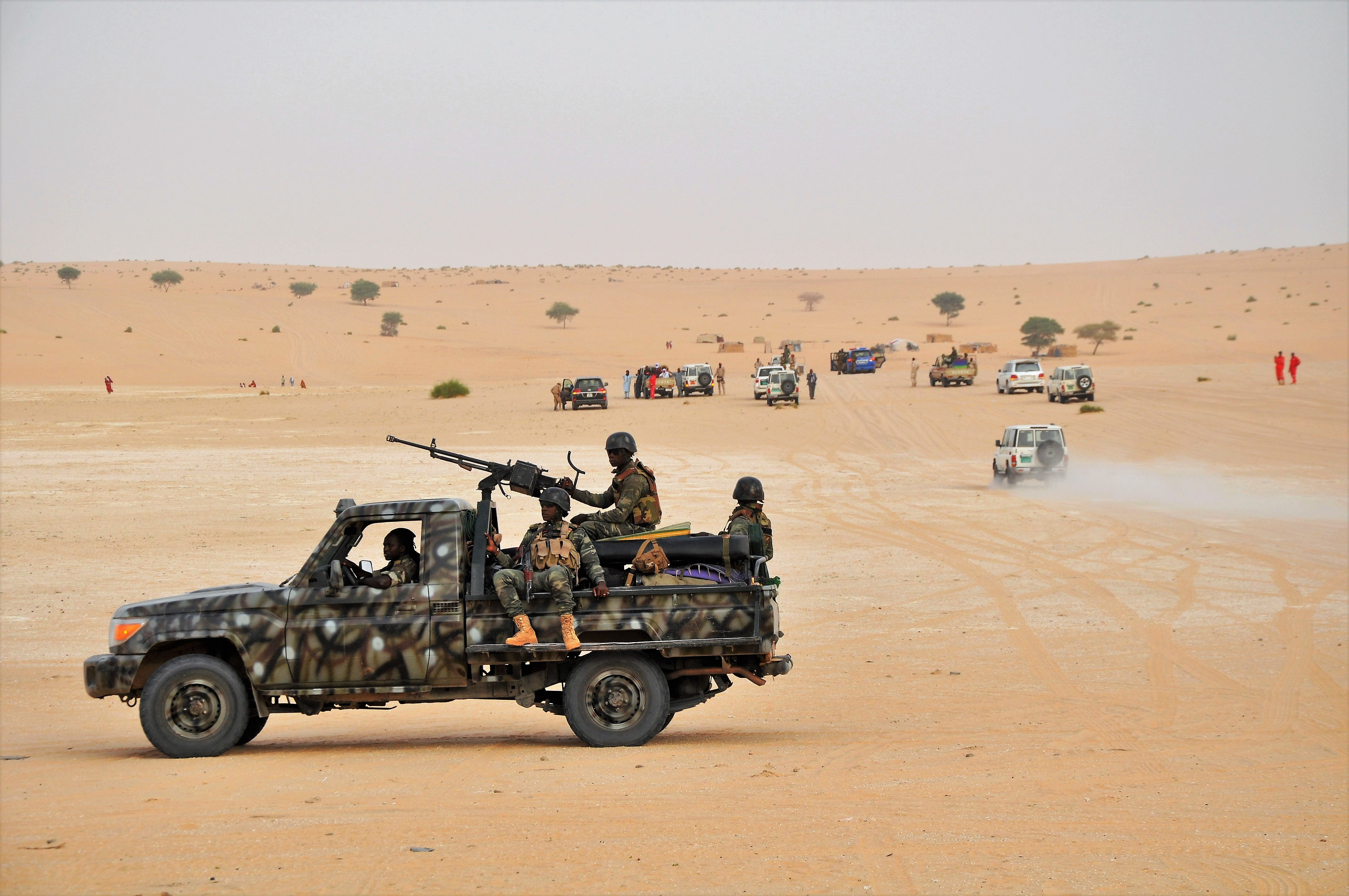
A Toyota Land Cruiser pickup vehicle in use by the Niger Armed Forces (2019).

Owing to its durability and reliability, the Land Cruiser, along with the smaller Toyota Hilux, has become popular among military forces and used as a military light utility vehicle. The vehicles are also popular with militant groups in war-torn regions. U.S. counter-terror officials enquired of Toyota how the extremist group Islamic State had apparently acquired large numbers of Toyota Land Cruisers and Hiluxes. Mark Wallace, the CEO of the Counter Extremism Project said, "Regrettably, the Toyota Land Cruiser and Hilux have effectively become almost part of the ISIS brand."

The Toyota Land Cruiser chassis is used on the KrAZ Cougar armoured truck, designed jointly by the Ukrainian company KrAZ and Emirati company STREIT Group.

== See also ==
- List of Toyota vehicles
