= List of Toyota engines =

This is a list of piston engines developed, independently or with other car companies, by Toyota Motor Corporation.

== Engine codes ==
Toyota has produced a wide variety of automobile engines, including three-cylinder, four-cylinder, V6, V8, V10, and V12 engines. The company follows a naming system for their engines:

1. The first numeric characters specify the engine block's model (usually differed by displacement)
2. The next one or two letters specify the engine family
3. The suffix (separated by a dash) specifies the features of the engine:

Suffix	Feature	Example Engine
A	Valvematic variable lift intake head	1ZR-FAE
B	Before 2000 indicates twin SU-style side-draft carburetors After 2000 indicates E85 Ethanol fuel.	3UR-FBE
C	Carbureted; California Emissions Controlled	3S-FC 2S-C
D	Twin downdraft carburetors Toyota engines manufactured by Daihatsu without VVT-i	1KR-DE
E	Multi-point fuel injection	3VZ-E
F	Normal cylinder head DOHC	1G-FE
G	Performance cylinder head DOHC	1G-GEU
H	High compression High pressure charged	2L-THE
I	Single-point fuel injection	4S-Fi
J	Autochoke (early models); Pollution control for commercial cars in Japan	
K	On-demand Atkinson cycle in non-hybrid engines	M20A-FKS
L	Transverse	1S-L
M	Philippines' market (meaning unknown)	
N	CNG fuel	5S-FNE
P	LPG fuel	3Y-P
R	Low Compression (For 87 and below octane fuel)	
S	Swirl intake (1980s); D-4S gasoline direct injection	3A-SU 1JZ-FSE
T	Turbocharged	2JZ-GTE
U	With catalytic converter Japan-spec emissions	3Y-EU
V	D-4D diesel common rail direct injection system Toyota engines manufactured by Daihatsu with VVT-i	1GD-FTV 1NR-VE
X	Hybrid Atkinson cycle	M20A-FXS
Z	Supercharged	4A-GZE

Other manufacturers may modify the engine after it has left the Toyota factory but the engine still keeps the original Toyota designation. For example, Lotus added a supercharger to the 2ZZ-GE in some versions of the Lotus Elise and Exige, but the engine is still labelled 2ZZ-GE, not 2ZZ-GZE.

Examples:

- 3S-GTE
  - 3S – Third model in the S engine family
  - G – Performance cylinder head DOHC
  - T – Turbocharged
  - E – Multi-point fuel injection
- 1UR-FSE
  - 1UR – First model in the UR engine family
  - F – Normal cylinder head DOHC
  - S – D-4S Gasoline direct injection
  - E – Multi-point fuel injection
- 1KD-FTV
  - 1KD – First model in the KD engine family
  - F – Normal cylinder head DOHC
  - T – Turbocharged
  - V – D-4D diesel common rail direct injection

The use of "G" to denote twin cam engines was decided on in 1971, with the renaming of the 10R into 8R-G. Before that, twin cams had received separate numerical codes.

In 1987, Toyota began assigning dual letter engine codes to some of the "engine family" categories in some engine lines, particularly six-cylinder models. This can create potential confusion. E.g. 1MZ-FE – This is not a supercharged, narrow angle, fuel injected M-series engine, but a narrow angle, fuel injected MZ-series engine. Confusion is easiest to avoid when using the dash to separate between the engine series and its own characteristics: for instance, 1MZ-FE rather than 1M-ZFE.

Starting in 2015, the designations after the dash have a maximum combination of three letters, even though there are more suffixes applicable, especially when newer engine technologies are introduced. For example, both the 2GR-FKS and 8AR-FTS engines have electronic multi-point fuel injection, but the "E" suffix is not included in the code.

=== Dynamic Force engine series ===
The Dynamic Force engine series introduced in 2017 uses a different naming scheme, which is similar to that used by Honda and Suzuki. The two numbers between the first and second letters denote the displacement of the engine in liters. The suffix denoting the features of the engine is still used, as with prior engines.

Examples:

- M20A-FKS
  - M20A is a 2.0-liter engine, as denoted by the "20" in "M20A"
  - F – Normal cylinder head DOHC
  - K – On-demand Atkinson cycle in non-hybrid engines
  - S – D-4S Gasoline direct injection
- T24A-FTS
  - T24A is a 2.4-liter engine, as denoted by the "24" in "T24A"
  - F – Normal cylinder head DOHC
  - T – Turbocharged
  - S – D-4S Gasoline direct injection

Some engines do not share the same displacement as with the one found in the engine code. For example, the displacement of the V35A-FTS is closer to 3.4 L despite being marketed as a 3.5 L engine. Moreover, there are a few engines that use the naming scheme of the Dynamic Force family of engines but are not actually part of them, such as the diesel-powered F33A-FTV.

== Gasoline ==
=== Flat-twin or Flat-four ===
- 1961 – U
  - 1961–1966 – 0.7 L (697 cc) U
  - 1965–1975 – 0.8 L (790 cc) 2U
  - 2012–2021 – 2.0 L (1,998 cc) 4U (by Subaru)

=== Straight-3 ===
- 2004 – KR – DOHC (by Daihatsu)
  - 2004 – 1.0 L (998 cc) 1KR
- 2013 – KS – OHV
  - 2013 – 0.9 L (952 cc) 1KS
- 2018 – WZ – DOHC (by Groupe PSA)
  - 2018 – 1.2 L 2WZ-LV
  - 2018 – 1.2 L 2WZ-HV (PSA PureTech)
- 2019 – M15A – DOHC
  - 2019 – 1.5 L (1490 cc) M15A
- 2020 – G16E – DOHC
  - 2020 – 1.6 L (1618 cc) G16E-GTS
- 2021 – WA – DOHC (by Daihatsu)
  - 2021 – 1.2 L (1198 cc) WA-VE/WA-VEX

=== Straight-4 ===
- 1939 – Type C – OHV
  - 1939–1941 – 2.3 L (2259 cc) C
- 1947 – Type S – SV
  - 1947–1959 – 1.0 L (995 cc) S
- 1953 – R – OHV/SOHC/DOHC
  - 1953–1964 – 1.5 L (1453 cc) R
  - 1964–1969 – 1.5 L (1490 cc) 2R
  - 1959–1968 – 1.9 L (1897 cc) 3R
  - 1965–1968 – 1.6 L (1587 cc) 4R
  - 1968–1986 – 2.0 L (1994 cc) 5R
  - 1969–1974 – 1.7 L (1707 cc) 6R
  - 1968–1970 – 1.6 L (1591 cc) 7R
  - 1968–1972 – 1.9 L (1858 cc) 8R
  - 1967–1968 – 1.6 L (1587 cc) 9R
  - 1968–1971 – 1.9 L (1858 cc) 10R
  - 1969–1988 – 1.6 L (1587 cc) 12R
  - 1974–1980 – 1.8 L (1808 cc) 16R
  - 1971–1982 – 2.0 L (1968 cc) 18R
  - 1975–1977 – 2.0 L (1968 cc) 19R
  - 1974–1980 – 2.2 L (2189 cc) 20R
  - 1978–1987 – 2.0 L (1972 cc) 21R
  - 1980–1995 – 2.4 L (2366 cc) 22R
- 1959 – P – OHV
  - 1959–1961 – 1.0 L (997 cc) P
  - 1961–1972 – 1.2 L (1198 cc) 2P
  - 1972–1979 – 1.3 L (1345 cc) 3P
  - 1978–1993 – 1.5 L (1493 cc) 4P
- 1966 – K – OHV
  - 1966–1969 – 1.1 L (1077 cc) K
  - 1969–1988 – 1.0 L (993 cc) 2K
  - 1969–1979 – 1.2 L (1166 cc) 3K
  - 1978–1989 – 1.3 L (1290 cc) 4K
  - 1983–1989 – 1.5 L (1486 cc) 5K
  - 1998–1998 – 1.8 L (1781 cc) 7K
- 1970 – T – OHV/DOHC
  - 1970–1979 – 1.4 L (1407 cc) T
  - 1970–1985 – 1.6 L (1588 cc) 2T
  - 1977–1985 – 1.8 L (1770 cc) 3T
  - 1970–1983 – 1.6 L (1588 cc) 12T
  - 1977–1982 – 1.8 L (1770 cc) 13T
  - 1982–1988 – 2.1 L (2090 cc) 4T
- 1978 – A – SOHC/DOHC
  - 1978–1979 – 1.5 L (1452 cc) 1A
  - 1979–1986 – 1.3 L (1295 cc) 2A
  - 1979–1988 – 1.5 L (1452 cc) 3A
  - 1979–2002 – 1.6 L (1587 cc) 4A
  - 1987–1998 – 1.5 L (1498 cc) 5A
  - 1989–1992 – 1.4 L (1397 cc) 6A
  - 1993–1998 – 1.8 L (1762 cc) 7A
  - 2004–2006 – 1.3 L (1342 cc) 8A
- 1979 – X – OHV (By Holden)
  - 1979–1982 – 1.9 L (1892 cc) 1X
- 1982 – S – SOHC/DOHC
  - 1982–1988 – 1.8 L (1832 cc) 1S
  - 1982–1987 – 2.0 L (1995 cc) 2S
  - 1985–2005 – 2.0 L (1998 cc) 3S
  - 1987–1998 – 1.8 L (1838 cc) 4S
  - 1990–2001 – 2.2 L (2164 cc) 5S
- 1982 – Y – OHV
  - 1982 – 1.6 L (1626 cc) 1Y
  - 1982 – 1.8 L (1812 cc) 2Y
  - 1982–1998 – 2.0 L (1998 cc) 3Y
  - 1985–1993 – 2.2 L (2237 cc) 4Y
- 1985 – E – SOHC/DOHC
  - 1985–1994 – 1.0 L (999 cc) 1E
  - 1985–1998 – 1.3 L (1295 cc) 2E
  - 1986–1994 – 1.5 L (1456 cc) 3E
  - 1989–1998 – 1.3 L (1331 cc) 4E
  - 1991–1999 – 1.5 L (1497 cc) 5E
- 1990 – TZ – DOHC
  - 1990–2000 – 2.4 L (2438 cc) 2TZ
- 1997 – ZZ – DOHC
  - 1997–2007 – 1.8 L (1794 cc) 1ZZ
  - 1999–2006 – 1.8 L (1796 cc) 2ZZ
  - 2000 – 1.6 L (1598 cc) 3ZZ
  - 2000 – 1.4 L (1398 cc) 4ZZ
- 1989 – RZ – SOHC/DOHC
  - 1989–2004 – 2.0 L (1998 cc) 1RZ
  - 1989–2006 – 2.4 L (2400 cc) 2RZ
  - 1990–2004 – 2.7 L (2693 cc) 3RZ
- 1999 – SZ – DOHC (by Daihatsu)
  - 1999 – 1 L (997 cc) 1SZ
  - 2001 – 1.3 L (1298 cc) 2SZ
  - 2006 – 1.5 L (1495 cc) 3SZ
- 1997 – NZ – DOHC
  - 1997 – 1.5 L (1497 cc) 1NZ
  - 1999 – 1.3 L (1298 cc) 2NZ
- 2000 – AZ – DOHC
  - 2000 – 2.0 L (1998 cc) 1AZ
  - 2000–2018 – 2.4 L (2362 cc) 2AZ
  - 2010–2013 – 2.4 L (2362 cc) 3AZ
- 2002 – BZ – OHV
  - 2002 – 4.1 L (4104 cc) 1BZ (LPG)
- 2003 – TR – DOHC
  - 2003 – 2.0 L (1998 cc) 1TR
  - 2003 – 2.7 L (2694 cc) 2TR
- 2007 – ZR – DOHC
  - 2007 – 1.6 L (1598 cc) 1ZR
  - 2007 – 1.8 L (1797 cc) 2ZR
  - 2007 – 2.0 L (1986 cc) 3ZR
  - 2010 – 1.6 L (1598 cc) 4ZR
  - 2011 – 1.8 L (1797 cc) 5ZR
  - 2013 – 2.0 L (1986 cc) 6ZR
  - 2014 – 1.8 L (1797 cc) 7ZR
  - 2015 – 1.8 L (1797 cc) 8ZR
- 2008 – NR – DOHC
  - 2008 – 1.33 L (1329 cc) 1NR
  - 2010 – 1.5 L (1496 cc) 2NR
  - 2011 – 1.2 L (1197 cc) 3NR
  - 2013 – 1.3 L (1329 cc) 4NR
  - 2013 – 1.5 L (1496 cc) 5NR
  - 2010 – 1.3 L (1329 cc) 6NR
  - 2010 – 1.5 L (1498 cc) 7NR
  - 2015 – 1.2 L (1197 cc) 8NR
  - 2017 – 1.2 L (1197 cc) 9NR
- 2008 – AR – DOHC
  - 2008–2020? – 2.7 L (2672 cc) 1AR
  - 2008 – 2.5 L (2494 cc) 2AR
  - 2013 – 2.5 L (2494 cc) 5AR
  - 2014 – 2.0 L (1998 cc) 6AR
  - 2015 – 2.0 L (1998 cc) 8AR
- 2014 – FS – OHV
  - 2014 – 3.7 L (3685 cc) 1FS (LPG)
- 2014 – RI – DOHC (Non-production)
  - 2014 – 2.0 L RI4A
  - 2014 – 2.0 L RI4AG
- 2017 – A25A – DOHC
  - 2017 – 2.5 L (2487 cc) A25A
- 2018 – M20A – DOHC
  - 2018 – 2.0 L (1987 cc) M20A
- 2021 – T24A – DOHC
  - 2021 – 2.4 L (2393 cc) T24A
- 2022 – S20A – DOHC
  - 2022 – 2.0 L (1997 cc) S20A
- 2025 – G20E – DOHC
  - 2025 – 2.0 L

=== Straight-6 ===
- 1935 – Type A – OHV
  - 1935–1947 – 3.4 L (3389 cc) A
- 1937 – Type B – OHV
  - 1937–1955 – 3.4 L (3389 cc) B
- 1944 – Type D – OHV (prototype)
  - 1944 – 4.1 L (4052 cc) D
- 1955 – F – OHV
  - 1955–1975 – 3.9 L (3878 cc) F
  - 1975–1987 – 4.2 L (4230 cc) 2F
  - 1985–1992 – 4.0 L (3956 cc) 3F
- 1965 – M – SOHC/DOHC
  - 1965–1985 – 2.0 L (1988 cc) M
  - 1966–1972 – 2.3 L (2253 cc) 2M
  - 1966–1971 – 2.0 L (1988 cc) 3M
  - 1972–1980 – 2.6 L (2563 cc) 4M
  - 1979–1988 – 2.8 L (2759 cc) 5M
  - 1984–1987 – 3.0 L (2954 cc) 6M
  - 1986–1992 – 3.0 L (2954 cc) 7M
- 1979 – G – SOHC/DOHC
  - 1979–2008 – 2.0 L (1988 cc) 1G
- 1990 – JZ – DOHC
  - 1990–2006 – 2.5 L (2491 cc) 1JZ
  - 1991–2006 – 3.0 L (2997 cc) 2JZ
- 1993 – FZ – DOHC
  - 1993–2007 – 4.5 L (4477 cc) 1FZ

=== V6 ===
- 1987 – VZ – DOHC/SOHC
  - 1987–1993 – 2.0 L (1992 cc) 1VZ
  - 1987–1991 – 2.5 L (2496 cc) 2VZ
  - 1987–1997 – 3.0 L (2958 cc) 3VZ
  - 1993–1998 – 2.5 L (2496 cc) 4VZ
  - 1995–2004 – 3.4 L (3378 cc) 5VZ
- 1994 – MZ – DOHC
  - 1994–2007 – 3.0 L (2995 cc) 1MZ
  - 1998–2001 – 2.5 L (2496 cc) 2MZ
  - 2003–2014 – 3.3 L (3310 cc) 3MZ
- 2002 – GR – DOHC
  - 2002 – 4.0 L (3956 cc) 1GR
  - 2006 – 3.5 L (3456 cc) 2GR
  - 2003–2010 – 3.0 L (2994 cc) 3GR
  - 2003–2015 – 2.5 L (2499 cc) 4GR
  - 2005 – 2.5 L (2497 cc) 5GR
  - 2013 – 4.0 L (3956 cc) 6GR
  - 2015 – 3.5 L (3456 cc) 7GR
  - 2017–2018 – 3.5 L (3456 cc) 8GR
- 2016 – 2.4 L H8909 – DOHC (Non-production)
  - 2016–2020 – 2.4 L H8909
  - 2021 – 3.5 L H8909
- 2017 – V35A – DOHC
  - 2017 – 3.4 L (3444 cc) V35A

=== V8 ===
- 1963 – V – OHV
  - 1963–1967 – 2.6 L (2,599 cc) V
  - 1967–1973 – 3.0 L (2,981 cc) 3V
  - 1973–1983 – 3.4 L (3,376 cc) 4V
  - 1983–1998 – 4.0 L (3,995 cc) 5V
- 1988 – R – DOHC (Non-production)
  - 1988 – 3.2 L (3,200 cc) R32V
  - 1989–1994 – 3.6 L (3,579 cc) R36V
- 1989 – UZ – DOHC
  - 1989–2002 – 4.0 L (3,969 cc) 1UZ
  - 1998–2009 – 4.7 L (4,663 cc) 2UZ
  - 2000–2010 – 4.3 L (4,292 cc) 3UZ
- 1996 – RV8 – DOHC (Non-production)
  - 1996 – 2.65L RV8A
  - 1997 – 2.65L RV8B
  - 1998 – 2.65L RV8C
  - 1999 – 2.65L RV8D
  - 2000 – 2.65L RV8E
  - 2002 – 2.65L RV8F
  - 2003 – 3.5L RV8I
  - 2003 – 3.0 L
  - 2006–2008 – 3.0 L RV8J
  - 2009 – 3.4 L RV8K, RV8KG
  - 2011 – 3.4 L RV8KLM
  - 2014 – 3.7 L RV8KLM
- 2003–2005 – Indy V8 – DOHC (Non-production)
- 2006–2009 – Formula One – RVX – DOHC (Non-production)
  - 2006 – 2.4 L (2,398 cc) RVX–06
  - 2007 – 2.4 L (2,398 cc) RVX-07
  - 2008 – 2.4 L (2,398 cc) RVX-08
  - 2009 – 2.4 L (2,398 cc) RVX-09
- 2006 – UR – DOHC
  - 2006–2023 – 4.6 L (4,608 cc) 1UR
  - 2007 – 5.0 L (4,969 cc) 2UR
  - 2007–2022 – 5.7 L (5,663 cc) 3UR
- 2027 – G40E – DOHC
  - 2027 – 4.0 L (3998 cc)

=== V10 ===
- 1991 – RV10 – DOHC (Non-production)
  - 1991–1993 – 3.5 L (3,500 cc) RV10
- 2001 – 2005 – Formula One – RVX – DOHC (Non-production)
  - 2001 – 3.0 L (2,998 cc) RVX-01
  - 2002 – 3.0 L (2,998 cc) RVX-02
  - 2003 – 3.0 L (2,998 cc) RVX-03
  - 2004 – 3.0 L (2,998 cc) RVX-04
  - 2005 – 3.0 L (2,998 cc) RVX-05
- 2010 – LR – DOHC/VVT-i
  - 2010–2012 – 4.8 L (4,805 cc) 1LR-GUE

=== V12 ===
- 1997 – GZ – DOHC
  - 1997–2017 – 5.0 L (4,996 cc) 1GZ-FE

== Diesel ==
Starting in 1957 until 1988, Toyota established a separate dealership in Japan dedicated to cars and trucks installed with diesel engines, called Toyota Diesel Store. When the dealership was disbanded, diesel products are now available at all locations, with commercial products exclusive to Toyota Store and Toyopet Store locations.

=== Straight-3 ===
2014 – ZS – OHV

- 2014 – 1.8 L (1,798 cc) 1ZS

=== Straight-4 ===
- 1959 – C (2nd Generation) – OHV
  - 1959–1961 – 1.5 L (1,491 cc) C
- 1964 – J – OHV
  - 1964–1978 – 2.3 L (2,336 cc) J
  - 1969–1983 – 2.5 L (2,481 cc) 2J
- 1974 – B – OHV/SOHC
  - 1972–1988 – 3.0 L (2,977 cc) B
  - 1977–1982 – 3.2 L (3,168 cc) 2B
  - 1980–1990 – 3.4 L (3,432 cc) 3B
  - 1984–1990 – 3.0 L (2,977 cc) 11B
  - 1984–1990 – 3.4 L (3,432 cc) 13B
  - 1988–1996 – 3.7 L (3,661 cc) 14B
  - 1996–2002 – 4.1 L (4,104 cc) 15B
- 1980 – L – SOHC
  - 1977–1983 – 2.2 L (2,188 cc) L
  - 1980–2004 – 2.4 L (2,446 cc) 2L
  - 1987–2006 – 2.4 L (2,446 cc) 2L-II change rocker arm to direct tappet drive
  - 1982–2003 – 2.4 L (2,446 cc) 2L-TE
  - 1991–1997 – 2.8 L (2,779 cc) 3L
  - 1997 – 3.0 L (2,986 cc) 5L
- 1983 – W – OHV
  - 1983–1995 – 4.0 L (4,009 cc) 1W (by Hino)
- 1984 – C (Third Generation) – SOHC
  - 1984–1992 – 1.8 L (1,839 cc) 1C
  - 1984–2000 – 2.0 L (1,974 cc) 2C
  - 1994–2002 – 2.2 L (2,184 cc) 3C
- 1986 – N – SOHC
  - 1986–1999 – 1.4 L (1,453 cc) 1N
- 1986 – Z – OHV [ja]
  - 1986–?? – 3.0 L (2,953 cc) 1Z
  - 19?? – 3.5 L (3,469 cc) 2Z
  - 19?? – 3.5 L (3,469 cc) 3Z
- 1989 – DZ – OHV
  - 1989 – 2.5 L (2,486 cc) 1DZ
  - 19?? – ?? L 2DZ [ja]
- 1993 – KZ – SOHC
  - 1993–2004 – 3.0 L (2,982 cc) 1KZ-TE
- 2000 – WZ – DOHC/SOHC (by Groupe PSA)
  - 2000–2001 – 1.9 L 1WZ (PSA DW8)
  - 2005–2010 – 1.4 L 2WZ-TV (PSA DV4)
  - 2012 – 1.6 L 3WZ (PSA DV6)
  - 2012 – 2.0 L 4WZ (PSA DW10)
  - 2019 – 1.5 L 5WZ (PSA DV5)
- 2000 – CD – DOHC
  - 2000–2006 – 2.0 L (1,995 cc) 1CD-FTV
- 2001 – ND – SOHC
  - 2001–2020 – 1.4 L (1,364 cc) 1ND-TV
- 2001 – KD – DOHC
  - 2000 – 3.0 L (2,982 cc) 1KD-FTV
  - 2001 – 2.5 L (2,494 cc) 2KD-FTV
- 2005 – AD – DOHC
  - 2006–2019 – 2.0 L (1,998 cc) 1AD-FTV
  - 2005–2015 – 2.2 L (2,231 cc) 2AD-FTV
- 2013 – WW – DOHC
  - 2013–2018 – 1.6 L (1,598 cc) 1WW-FTV
  - 2015–2018 – 2.0 L (1,995 cc) 2WW-FTV
- 2015 – GD – DOHC
  - 2015 – 2.8 L (2,755 cc) 1GD-FTV
  - 2015 – 2.4 L (2,393 cc) 2GD-FTV
  - 2026 – 3.0 L (2,999 cc) 3GD-FTV

=== Straight-5 ===
- 1989 – PZ – SOHC
  - 1990–2001 – 3.5 L (3,470 cc) 1PZ

=== Straight-6 ===
- 1956–1979 – D
  - 1956–1961 – 5.9 L (5890 cc) 1D
  - 1962–1979 – 6.5 L (6494 cc) 2D
- 1967 – 1990 – H – OHV
  - 1967–1971 – 3.5 L (3576 cc) H (Early) Indirect Injection
  - 1972–1980 – 3.6 L (3576 cc) H Indirect Injection
  - 1981–1990 – 4.0 L (3980 cc) 2H Indirect Injection
  - 1989–1990 – 4.0 L (3980 cc) 12H-T Turbocharged Direct Injection
- 1990 – Present – HZ – SOHC
  - 1990–Present – 4.2 L (4164 cc) 1HZ Indirect Injection
- 1989 – 2001 – HD – SOHC
  - 1989–2001 – 4.2 L (4164 cc) 1HD-T Direct Injection
  - 1992–1998 – 4.2 L (4164 cc) 1HD-FT Turbocharged Direct Injection
  - 1998–2007 – 4.2 L (4164 cc) 1HD-FTE Turbocharged Direct Injection
- 1990 – Z – OHV [ja]
  - 1990–?? – 4.5 L (4429 cc) 11Z
  - 1990–?? – 5.0 L (4994 cc) 12Z
  - 1996–?? – 4.6 L (4616 cc) 13Z
  - 1996 – 5.2 L (5204 cc) 14Z
  - 19?? – 5.2 L (5204 cc) 15Z

Engine	1D	2D	H (early)	H	2H	12H-T	1HZ	1HD-T	1HD-FT	1HD-FTE	1HD-FTE(intercooled)
Years produced	1956–1961	1962–1979	1967–present	1972–present	1981–1990	1986–1990	1990–present	1989–2001	1992–1998	1998–2007	1998–2007
Power (kW)			67 @ 3600	71 @ 3600	77 @ 3500	101 @ 3500	96 @ 4000	123 @ 3600	125 @ 3600	125 @ 3400	151 @ 3400
Power (HP)	110 @ 2600	130 @ 2600	90 @ 3600	95 @ 3600	103 @ 3500	136 @ 3500	129 @ 4000	165 @ 3600	168 @ 3600	168 @ 3400	202 @ 3400
Torque (Nm)	343 @ 1200	392 @ 1400	205 @ 2200	216 @ 2200	240 @ 2000	313 @ 2000	285 @ 2200	363 @ 2000	380 @ 2500	380 @ 3200	430 @ 3200
Torque (ft·lb)			151 @ 2200	159 @ 2200	177 @ 2000	231 @ 2000	210 @ 2200	268 @ 2000	280 @ 2500	280 @ 3200	317 @ 3200
Capacity	5890 cc	6494 cc	3576 cc	3576 cc	3980 cc	3980 cc	4164 cc	4164 cc	4164 cc	4164 cc	4164 cc
Bore × Stroke (mm)	100 × 125	105 × 125	88 × 98	88 × 98	91 × 102	91 × 102	94 × 100	94 × 100	94 × 100	94 × 100	94 × 100
Compression Ratio	17.2 : 1	18.0 : 1	21.0 : 1	19.5 : 1	20.7 : 1	18.6 : 1	22.7 : 1	18.6 : 1	18.6 : 1	18.8 : 1	18.8 : 1
Aspiration	Natural	Natural	Natural	Natural	Natural	Turbo	Natural	Turbo	Turbo	Turbo	Turbo(Intercooled)
Number of Valves	12	12	12	12	12	12	12	12	24	24	24
Cam Arrangement			Gear-driven OHV	Gear-driven OHV	Gear-driven OHV	Gear-driven OHV	Belt-driven SOHC	Belt-driven SOHC	Belt-driven SOHC	Belt-driven SOHC	Belt-driven SOHC
Injection			Indirect	Indirect	Indirect	Direct	Indirect	Direct	Direct	Direct	Direct
Injector Pump			Inline	Inline	Inline	Inline	Rotary	Rotary	Rotary	Rotary	Rotary

=== V6 ===
- 2021 – F33A – DOHC
  - 2021–Present – 3.3 L (3345 cc) F33A-FTV

=== V8 ===
- 2007 – VD – DOHC
  - 2007–Present – 4.5 L (4461 cc) 1VD-FTV
