= Toyota F33A engine =

Overview
- Manufacturer: Toyota
- Production: 2021–present

Layout
- Configuration: 90° V6
- Displacement: 3,345 cc (204.1 cu in)
- Cylinder bore: 86.0 mm (3.386 in)
- Piston stroke: 96.0 mm (3.780 in)
- Cylinder block material: Cast-iron
- Cylinder head material: Aluminium alloy
- Valvetrain: DOHC
- Compression ratio: 15.4:1

Combustion
- Turbocharger: Variable-nozzle twin-turbo with intercooler
- Fuel system: Common rail direct injection
- Fuel type: Diesel
- Cooling system: Water-cooled

Output
- Power output: 220–227 kW (299–308 PS)
- Specific power: 65.8–67.9 kW (88–91 hp; 89–92 PS) per litre
- Torque output: 700 N⋅m (516 lb⋅ft)

Chronology
- Predecessor: 1VD-FTV (V8)

The Toyota F33A engine is a 3,345 cc (204.1 cu in) V6 diesel engine built by Toyota that was first introduced in June 2021 for the Land Cruiser. It is the first V6 diesel engine to be built by the automaker, as well as the first 90 degree V6 engine to be made by Toyota. Despite the shortcoming of increased vibrations associated with the 90 degree V6 configuration, these vibrations are easily mitigated by a counter rotating balance shaft, and the engineers were able to use the additional space afforded between the cylinder banks to place the turbochargers there in a hot-vee configuration. The balance shaft is also neatly nestled into the block between the cylinder banks. A separate rear balancing weight is also present to externally balance the engine.

Despite using the same naming scheme as with the Dynamic Force family of engines, this engine is not part of them.

== Models ==
Series	Model	Applications	Vehicle model code	Power	Torque	Years	Notes
F33A	F33A-FTV	Land Cruiser	FJA300	220–227 kW (299–308 PS; 295–304 hp) at 4,000 rpm	700 N⋅m (516 lb⋅ft) at 1,600–2,600 rpm	2021–present	
F33A	F33A-FTV	Lexus LX 500d	FJA310	220–227 kW (299–308 PS; 295–304 hp) at 4,000 rpm	700 N⋅m (516 lb⋅ft) at 1,600–2,600 rpm	2022–present	

=== F33A-FTV ===
The F33A-FTV is a twin-turbocharged engine model with 15.4:1 compression ratio and common rail direct injection system.

==== Applications ====
- 2021–present Land Cruiser (FJA300)
- 2022–present Lexus LX 500d (FJA310)

== See also ==
- List of Toyota engines
