= Toyota LR engine =

Motor vehicle engine

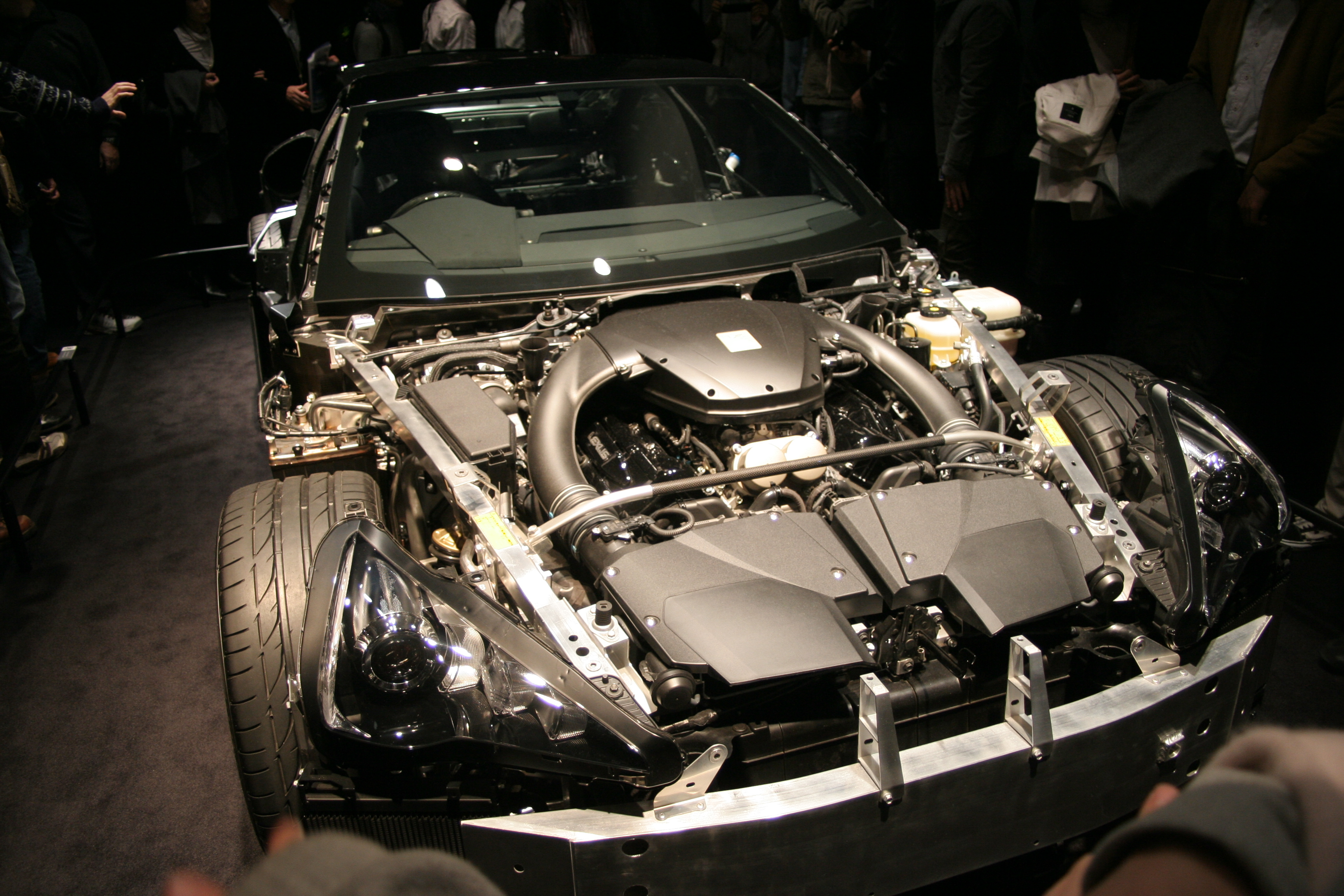

Overview
- Manufacturer: Toyota/Yamaha
- Production: 2009–2012

Layout
- Configuration: 72° V10
- Displacement: 4.8 L (4,805 cc)
- Cylinder bore: 88 mm (3.5 in)
- Piston stroke: 79 mm (3.11 in)
- Cylinder head material: Aluminum
- Valvetrain: DOHC, with VVT
- Compression ratio: 12.0:1

Combustion
- Fuel system: Multi-point fuel injection
- Fuel type: Gasoline
- Cooling system: Water cooled

Output
- Power output: 412 kW (553 hp; 560 PS) at 8.700 rpm
- Torque output: 480 N⋅m (354 lb⋅ft) at 6.800 rpm

The Toyota LR engine is a naturally aspirated V10 gasoline engine built by Toyota and Yamaha. The engine powers the Lexus LFA.

== 1LR-GUE ==
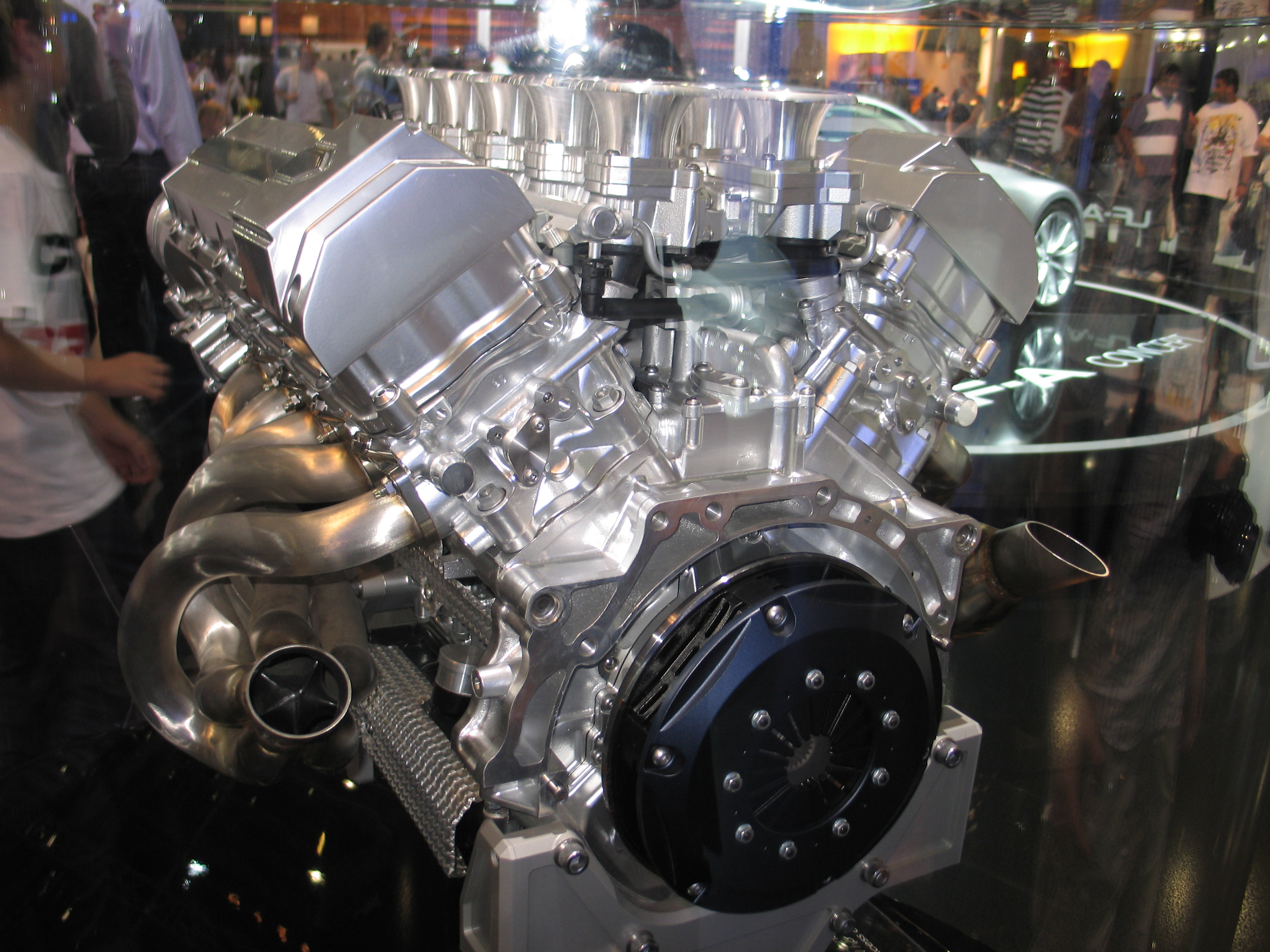
The Lexus LF-A V10 engine

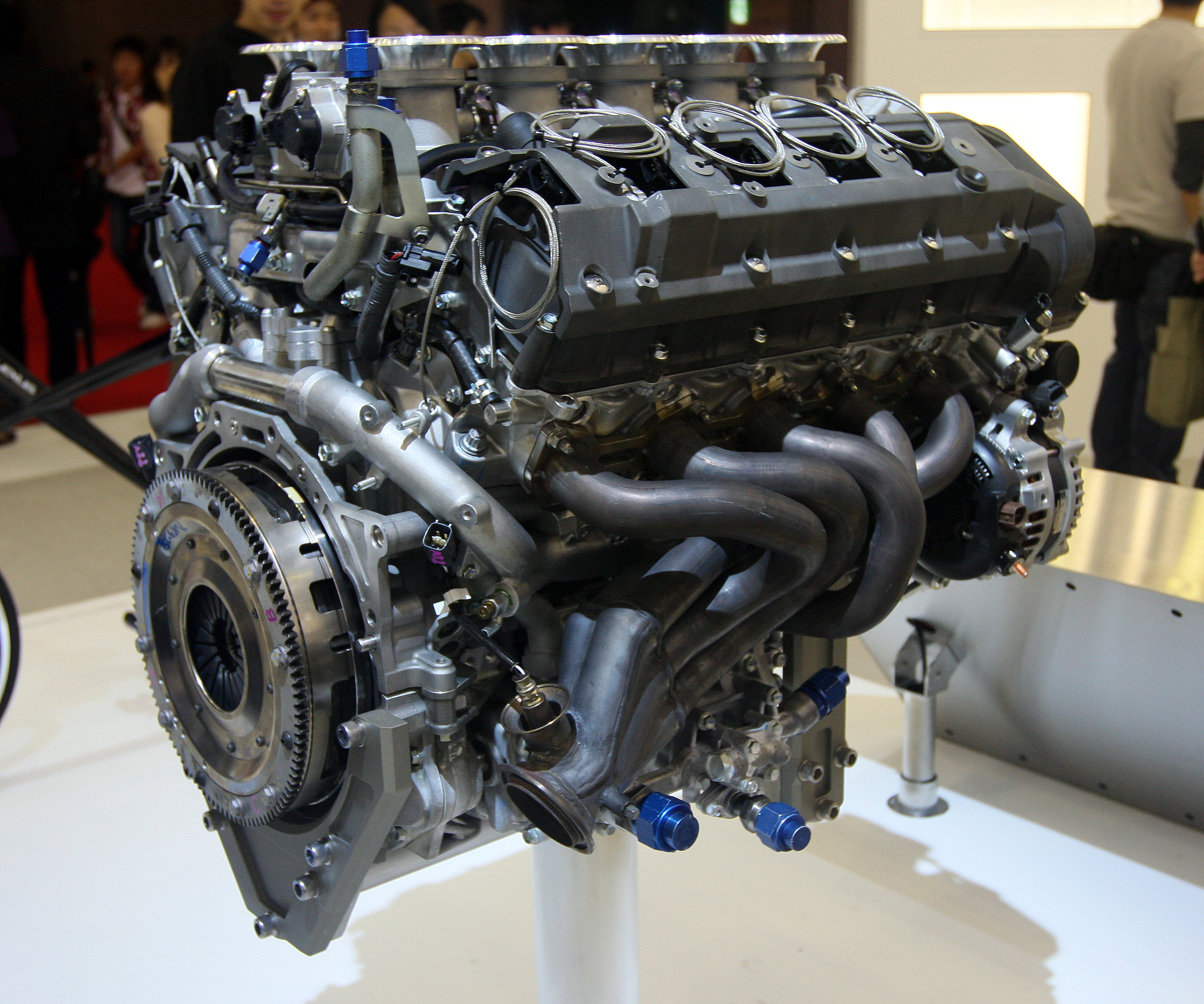
Toyota-Yamaha Lexus LF-A Production Prototype engine 2009 Tokyo Motor Show

Announced in the Lexus LFA sports car, the 1LR-GUE is a 4,805 cc (4.8 L; 293.2 cu in) DOHC 4 valves per cylinder V10 engine, made from aluminum alloy, magnesium alloy and titanium alloy and is smaller than most V8s.

The oil and water pumps are located at the rear of the engine and the lubrication system uses a dry sump. Titanium is used for the valves and the rocker arms have a diamond-like coating. Each cylinder has an independent, electronically controlled throttle body.

Yamaha was contracted to co-develop the 1LR-GUE. The exhaust system was co-developed with Yamaha's music division. The engineers described the sound of the engine as "the roar of an Angel".

Maximum power output is 560 PS (552 bhp; 412 kW) at 8,700 rpm. Maximum torque is 480 N⋅m (354 ft⋅lb) at 6,800 rpm. The engine redlines at 9000 rpm and has a fuel cut-off at 9500 rpm, with 90% of its peak torque available from 3,700 rpm to 9,000 rpm. An LCD tachometer was fitted to the LFA as an analog fixture allegedly was not responsive enough to the engine's ability to change speed. The Lexus LFA broke the world record in 2012, for the fastest production engine revving from idle to redline in 0.6 seconds. It features a single circular dial with a central tachometer with an LCD needle. When engine speed exceeds 9000 rpm, the display area turns red to alert the driver to up-shift.

- Bore × stroke: 88 mm (3.46 in) × 79.0 mm (3.11 in)
- Compression ratio: 12.0:1
- V angle: 72 degrees
- Exhaust emissions certification: Euro 5

Applications:

- Lexus LFA

== See also ==
- List of Toyota engines
