= Toyota FZ engine =

FZ engine
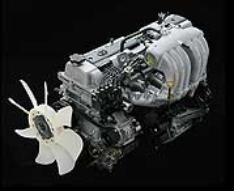

Overview
- Manufacturer: Toyota
- Production: 1992–2008

Layout
- Configuration: Inline-6
- Displacement: 4.5 L (4,477 cc)
- Cylinder bore: 100 mm (3.94 in)
- Piston stroke: 95 mm (3.74 in)
- Valvetrain: DOHC 4 valves x cyl.
- Compression ratio: 9.0:1

Combustion
- Fuel system: Carburetor (1FZ-F); Fuel injection (1FZ-FE)
- Fuel type: Petrol
- Cooling system: Water-cooled

Output
- Power output: 188 hp (140 kW) (1FZ-F); 212 hp (158 kW) (1FZ-FE); 225 hp (168 kW) (1FZ-FE 1998-2009)
- Torque output: 268 lb⋅ft (363 N⋅m) @ 2800 rpm (1FZ-F); 275 lb⋅ft (373 N⋅m) @ 3200 rpm (1FZ-FE); 285 lb⋅ft (386 N⋅m) @ 3600 rpm (1FZ-FE 1998-2009)

Chronology
- Predecessor: Toyota F engine

The Toyota FZ engine is a 24-valve, 4.5 L (4,477 cc) DOHC straight-6 internal combustion engine manufactured by Toyota to replace the F-series engine. It was used primarily in SUVs because of its large displacement, smoothness, ruggedness and torque.

== Technical data ==
The engine displaces 4.5 L (4,477 cc), with a bore and stroke measuring 100 mm × 95 mm (3.94 in × 3.74 in), respectively and a 9.0:1 compression ratio; the head used Toyota's narrow-angle overhead camshafts for better fuel economy. The 1FZ had only two variants available: the 1FZ-F and the 1FZ-FE. The only significant difference between the two was the inclusion of electronic fuel injection on the 1FZ-FE, whereas the 1FZ-F used a carburetor.

The 1FZ-F produced 188 hp (140 kW) at 4400 rpm and 268 lb⋅ft (363 N⋅m) at 2800 rpm; its fuel injected counterpart produced 212 hp (158 kW) at 4600 rpm and 275 lb⋅ft (373 N⋅m) at 3200 rpm.

Starting in 1998, the fuel injected version (1FZ-FE) was updated in certain non-US markets. This version of the engine received many updates over the previous version such as a redesigned head, more compact pistons, updated throttle body, an improved intake manifold with longer intake runners, 4 nozzle fuel injectors to improve fuel atomization and direct ignition (via a wasted spark set-up with three dual outlet coils); the engine pictured here is that variant discernible by the intake manifold and lack of distributor. This version of the 1FZ-FE produced 240 hp (179 kW) at 4600 rpm and 300 lb⋅ft (407 N⋅m) at 3600 rpm on 91 Octane Fuel (RON) without a catalytic converter.

Also, a de-rated LPG version was built for the 7FG/7FZ series forklifts. Called 1FZ-E it produced 63 kW (84 hp) at 2350 rpm and 294 N⋅m (217 lbf⋅ft) at 1200 rpm

== Usage ==
The 1FZ-F and -FE were used in the following vehicles:

- 1992–2009 Toyota Land Cruiser (FZJ7x)
- 1992–2007 Toyota Land Cruiser (FZJ80)
- 1998–2007 Toyota Land Cruiser (FZJ100, FZJ105) 1FZ-FE
- 1995–1997 Lexus LX 450 (1FZ-FE only)
- Toyota 5FG/5FD series forklifts
- Toyota 7FG/7FD series forklifts

== See also ==
List of Toyota engines
