= Toyota N engine =

Overview
- Manufacturer: Toyota Motor Corporation
- Production: 1986–1999

Layout
- Configuration: Inline-four
- Displacement: 1.5 L (1,453 cc)
- Valvetrain: SOHC 2 valves x cyl.

Combustion
- Fuel system: Indirect injection
- Fuel type: Diesel
- Cooling system: Water-cooled

Output
- Power output: 54–66 hp (40–49 kW; 55–67 PS)
- Torque output: 9.1–14.0 kg⋅m (89–137 N⋅m; 66–101 lb⋅ft)

Chronology
- Successor: Toyota ND engine

The Toyota N engine is a series of diesel engines manufactured by Toyota from 1986 to 1999. The N series comprises small displacement, inline-four diesel units designed for compact passenger vehicles.

== 1N ==
The 1N is a 1.5 L (1,500 cc) inline-four diesel engine. It utilizes a single overhead camshaft (SOHC) configuration with two valves per cylinder.

The engine's internal dimensions feature a bore of 74 mm (2.9 in) and a stroke of 84.5 mm (3.33 in), resulting in a compression ratio of 22:1. In terms of performance, the naturally aspirated 1N produces a peak power output of 55 PS (40 kW; 54 hp) at 5,200 rpm. Torque output ranges from 9.1 kg⋅m (89 N⋅m; 66 lb⋅ft) to 9.3 kg⋅m (91 N⋅m; 67 lb⋅ft), depending on the specific vehicle application.

=== Applications ===
- 55 PS (40 kW; 54 hp) at 5,200 rpm, 9.3 kg⋅m (91 N⋅m; 67 lb⋅ft) at 3,000 rpm (Net):
  - 3rd and 4th Generation Toyota Starlet (NP70/80)
- 55 PS (40 kW; 54 hp) at 5,200 rpm, 9.1 kg⋅m (89 N⋅m; 66 lb⋅ft) at 2,600 rpm (Net):
  - 5th Generation Toyota Starlet (NP90)

== 1N-T ==
The 1N-T is the turbocharged variant of the 1.5 L diesel engine. While sharing the same bore and stroke (74 mm and 84.5 mm) and 22:1 compression ratio as the standard 1N, the addition of forced induction increases performance significantly.

The 1N-T generates a peak power output of 67 PS (49 kW; 66 hp). Torque is also improved, ranging between 13.3 kg⋅m (130 N⋅m; 96 lb⋅ft) and 14.0 kg⋅m (137 N⋅m; 101 lb⋅ft), providing greater pulling power for the vehicles it powers.

=== Applications ===
- 67 PS (49 kW; 66 hp) at 4,700 rpm, 13.3 kg⋅m (130 N⋅m; 96 lb⋅ft) at 2,600 rpm (Net):
  - 2nd Generation Toyota Corolla II / Toyota Corsa / Toyota Tercel (NL30)
- 67 PS (49 kW; 66 hp) at 4,500 rpm, 14.0 kg⋅m (137 N⋅m; 101 lb⋅ft) at 2,600 rpm (Net):
  - 3rd Generation Toyota Corolla II / Toyota Corsa / Toyota Tercel (NL40)
- 67 PS (49 kW; 66 hp) at 4,200 rpm, 14.0 kg⋅m (137 N⋅m; 101 lb⋅ft) at 2,600 rpm (Net):
  - 4th Generation Toyota Corolla II / Toyota Corsa / Toyota Tercel (NL50)
