= Toyota ND engine =

Overview
- Manufacturer: Toyota
- Production: 2002–2020

Layout
- Configuration: Inline-four
- Displacement: 1.4 L (1,364 cc)
- Cylinder bore: 73 mm (2.87 in)
- Piston stroke: 81.5 mm (3.21 in)
- Cylinder block material: Aluminium
- Valvetrain: SOHC 2 valves x cyl.
- Compression ratio: 16.0:1 - 18.5:1

Combustion
- Turbocharger: Variable-geometry with intercooler / Fixed-geometry turbocharger with intercooler
- Fuel system: Common Rail direct injection
- Fuel type: Diesel
- Cooling system: Water-cooled

Output
- Power output: 68–90 PS (50–66 kW; 67–89 hp)
- Torque output: 170–205 N⋅m (125–151 lb⋅ft)

Dimensions
- Dry weight: 99 kg (218 lb)

Chronology
- Predecessor: Toyota N engine

The Toyota ND is an inline-four diesel engine used for Toyota models in various markets including Japanese, Indian and European ones.

== 1ND-TV ==
The 1ND-TV (1.4 D-4D) is a compact inline-four cylinder turbocharged diesel engine used in various markets including Japanese, Indian and European markets. It was introduced into European market in 2002 with the Yaris XP10 and XP20 Yaris Verso. it was Toyota's first diesel engine to be equipped with an aluminium cylinder block. It was offered in Indian market in Toyota Corolla (88.4 PS (65 kW; 87 hp) model) & Etios (68PS model) sedans. Principal aims of its development were low emissions and fuel consumption, reduction of mass (dry weight is 99 kg (218 lb)) and reduction of noise.

Technical specifications of the latest engine version:

- Displacement: 1.4 L (1,364 cc)
- Bore x stroke: 73 mm × 81.5 mm (2.87 in × 3.21 in)
- Max. power:
  - 68 PS (50 kW; 67 hp) (FGT) at 3800 rpm
  - 75 PS (55 kW; 74 hp) (FGT) at 4000 rpm
  - 88.4 PS (65 kW; 87 hp) (VGT) at 3800 rpm
  - 90 PS (66 kW; 89 hp) (VGT) at 3800 rpm
- Max. torque:
  - 170 N⋅m (125 lb⋅ft) (FGT) at 1800 - 2400 rpm
  - 170 N⋅m (125 lb⋅ft) (FGT) at 2000 - 2800 rpm
  - 192 N⋅m (142 lb⋅ft) (VGT) at 1800 - 2800 rpm
  - 205 N⋅m (151 lb⋅ft) (VGT) at 1800 - 2800 rpm
  - 205 N⋅m (151 lb⋅ft) (VGT) at 1400 - 2800 rpm ( Euro 6 emissions with smaller turbo and increased rail pressure )
- Fuel Supply system: direct injection
- Intake system: fixed/variable-geometry turbocharger with intercooler
- Valve mechanism: SOHC, 2 valves per cylinder
- Compression Ratio:
  - 18.5:1
  - 17.9:1
  - 16.0:1
- Fuel Injection System: Common Rail at 1,600 bar (23,000 psi), 6 hole injectors
- Camshaft drive: timing chain
- Exhaust gas treatment: EGR, equipped with cooler and catalytic converter;
- Emission standard: Euro III (2001–2005); Euro IV, Euro V; Euro VI ( 2015 ); BS IV
- Fuel economy as per ARAI: 23.59 km/L (66.6 mpg_{‑imp}; 55.5 mpg_{‑US}), 4.8 L/100 km (49 mpg_{‑US}; 59 mpg_{‑imp})
- CO_{2} emission combined: 128 g (4.5 oz)/km * * Toyota Corolla 1.4 D-4D, NEDC ** 109 g (3.8 oz)/km Toyota Yaris
- Production: Japan

== Applications ==
- Toyota Auris
- Toyota Corolla
- Toyota Etios
- Toyota Etios Liva
- Toyota Etios Cross
- Toyota iQ
- Toyota Ractis
- Toyota Urban Cruiser
- Toyota Verso-S
- Toyota Yaris
- Mini One D
- Mini Cooper D
- Toyota Probox
