= Toyota HD engine =

Toyota diesel engine series

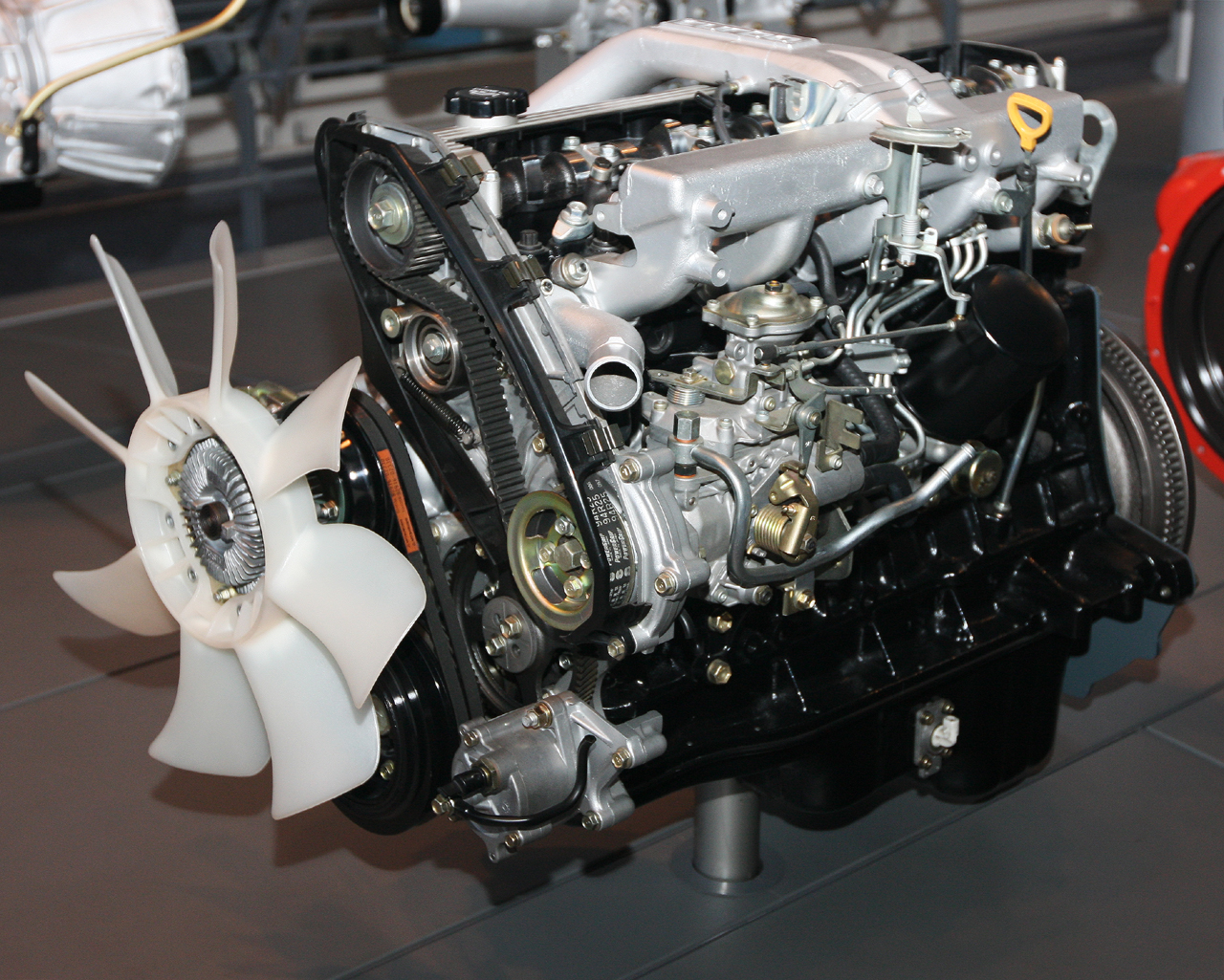
- 1989 Toyota 1HD-T engine

Overview
- Manufacturer: Toyota

Layout
- Configuration: Straight-6
- Displacement: 4.2 L (4,164 cc)
- Cylinder bore: 94 mm (3.70 in)
- Piston stroke: 100 mm (3.94 in)
- Valvetrain: SOHC, 12 & 24 valves
- Compression ratio: 18.6:1, 18.8:1

RPM range
- Max. engine speed: 4200 rpm

Combustion
- Turbocharger: Yes, with intercooler (some versions)
- Fuel system: Direct injection
- Fuel type: Diesel
- Cooling system: Water-cooled

Output
- Power output: 122–313 kW (164–420 hp; 166–426 PS)
- Torque output: 361–430 N⋅m (266–317 lb⋅ft)

Chronology
- Predecessor: 12H-T
- Successor: 1VD-FTV (V8)

The Toyota HD is a series of diesel engines produced by Toyota.

== 1HD-T ==
The 1HD-T is a 12-valve 4.2 L (4,164 cc) straight-6 SOHC turbocharged direct injection diesel engine. Bore and stroke is 94 mm × 100 mm (3.70 in × 3.94 in), with a compression ratio of 18.6:1. Output is 122 kW (164 hp; 166 PS) at 3,600 rpm with 361 N⋅m (266 lb⋅ft) of torque at 1,400 rpm.

- Coaster, HDB20, January 1990 – January 1993
- Coaster, HDB30, January 1990 – January 1993
- Coaster, HDB50, January 1993 – January 1995
- Land Cruiser, HDJ80, January 1990 – January 1995
- Land Cruiser, HDJ100, January 1998 – July 2000

== 1HD-FT ==
The 1HD-FT is a 4.2 L (4,164 cc) straight-6 24-valve SOHC turbocharged direct injection diesel engine. Bore and stroke is 94 mm × 100 mm (3.70 in × 3.94 in), with a compression ratio of 18.6:1. Known as the "multivalve" it has 4 valves per cylinder (2 inlet, 2 exhaust), central vertically mounted injector, and no glow plugs but rather an intake glow screen heater (like the later electronic 1HD-FTE below). The 4 valves per cylinder are actuated by the SOHC, by using bridges so each rocker actuates a pair of valves. Output is 125 kW (168 hp; 170 PS) ECE at 3,600 rpm with 380 N⋅m (280 lb⋅ft) of torque ECE at 2,500 rpm. However, marinized version of 1HD (sold as Yamaha ME and Yanmar 6LP) have an output of 235 kW (315 hp; 319 PS) on Yanmar 6LP and 235 kW (315 hp; 319 PS), 276 kW (370 hp; 375 PS) or 313 kW (420 hp; 426 PS) on Yamaha ME.

- Coaster, HDB50, July 1995 – July 1999
- Land Cruiser, HDJ80, July 1995 – July 1999
- Yanmar 6LP and Yamaha ME diesel engine (marinized version of 1HD-FT).

== 1HD-FTE ==
The 1HD-FTE is a 4.2 L (4,164 cc) straight-6 24-valve SOHC turbocharged diesel engine. The four valves per cylinder are actuated by the SOHC by using bridges where each rocker actuates a pair of valves. Bore and stroke is 94 mm × 100 mm (3.70 in × 3.94 in), with a compression ratio of 18.8:1. For non-intercooled versions, output was advertised as 125 kW (167 hp; 169 PS) at 3,400 rpm with 380 N⋅m (280 lb⋅ft) of torque at 1,400 rpm, and intercooled versions were advertised as having 151 kW (202 hp; 205 PS) at 3400 rpm with 430 N⋅m (317 lb⋅ft) of torque at 1200-3200 rpm. The fuel system is direct injection and adopts 120 MPa (17,405 psi) electronic fuel injection (EFI), in contrast to previous versions. The redline of this engine is 4200 rpm.

Intercooled versions were fitted in Toyota Land Cruiser 100 series, while non-intercooled versions were fitted in Toyota Land Cruiser 70 series. Some Toyota Coasters were fitted with this engine as well.

The engine was marketed under the Light-weight Advanced Super Response Engines (LASRE) moniker in marketing material.
