= Toyota VD engine =

4.5-litre turbocharged V8 diesel engine

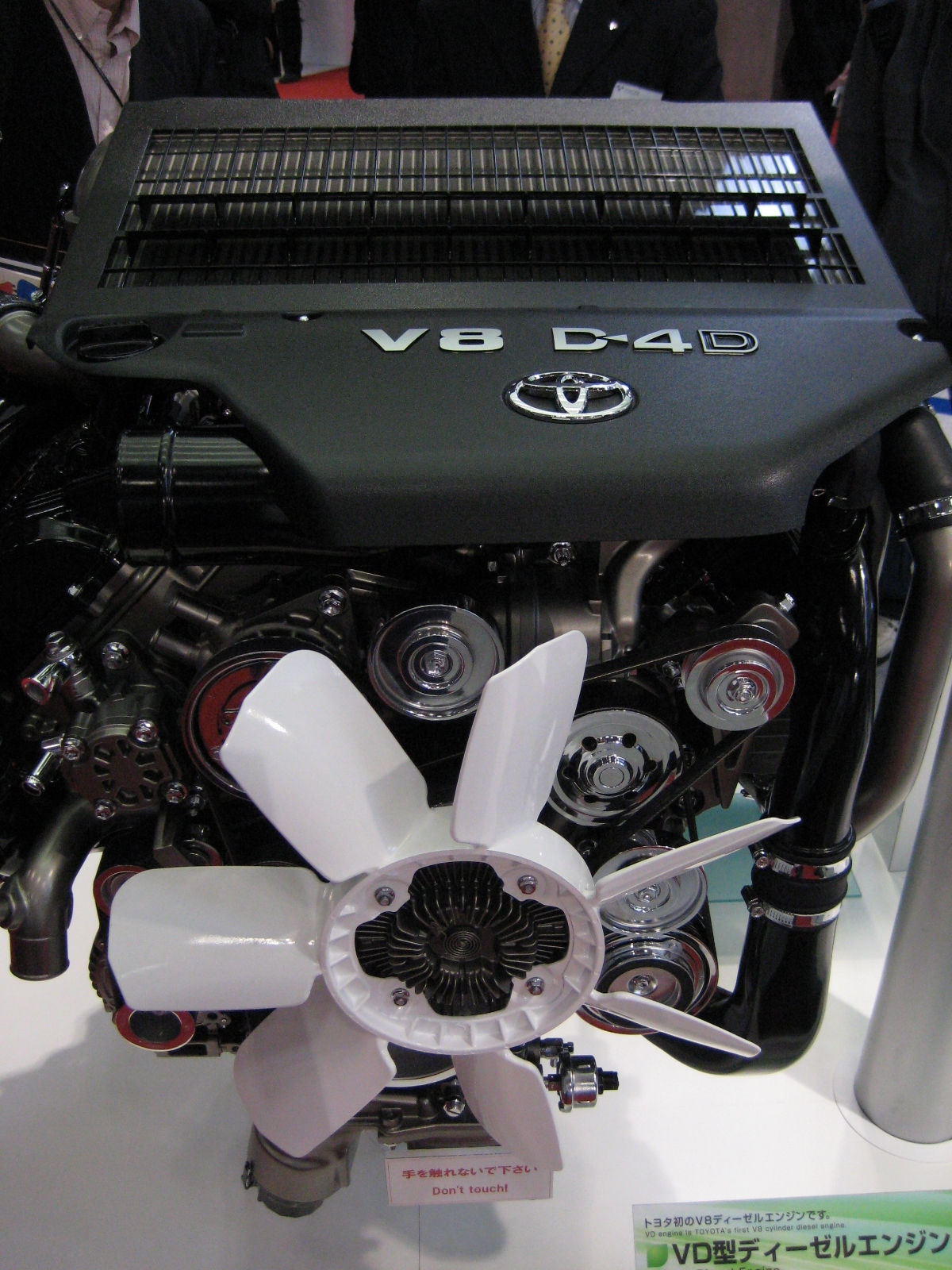
- Twin-turbo version of the 1VD-FTV engine

Overview
- Manufacturer: Toyota
- Production: 2007–present

Layout
- Configuration: V8
- Displacement: 4.5 L; 272.2 cu in (4,461 cc)
- Cylinder bore: 86 mm (3.39 in)
- Piston stroke: 96 mm (3.78 in)
- Valvetrain: DOHC, 4 valves per cylinder
- Compression ratio: 16.8:1

Combustion
- Turbocharger: Single or twin variable-geometry with intercooler
- Fuel system: Common rail direct injection
- Fuel type: Diesel
- Cooling system: Water-cooled

Output
- Power output: 151–272 kW (202–365 hp; 205–370 PS)
- Torque output: 430–650 N⋅m (317–479 lb⋅ft)

Chronology
- Predecessor: 1HD-FTE (I6)
- Successor: F33A-FTV (V6)

The Toyota VD engine is a family of V8 diesel engines produced by Toyota since 2007.

== 1VD-FTV ==
The 1VD-FTV is the only member in the VD engine family. It is a 32-valve DOHC engine, with common rail fuel injection and either one or two variable-geometry turbochargers.

=== Vehicles and availability ===
The single-turbo variant of this engine was first used in Australia commencing 2007, fitted to the 70-series Land Cruiser range. The engine is available in Australia, New Zealand, Pakistan, India, Southern Africa, gulf countries, Central and South America.

The twin-turbo variant saw its first use in September 2007 fitted to the 200-series Land Cruiser wagon, which is available in various worldwide markets. Yanmar also marinized the twin-turbo variant of this engine as 8LV.

=== Specifications ===
- Designation: 1VD-FTV
- Maximum power:
  - Single turbo non-intercooled: 136 kW (182 hp; 185 PS) @ 3200 rpm;
  - Single turbo: 151 kW (202 hp; 205 PS) @ 3400 rpm;
  - Twin turbo: 210 kW (282 hp; 286 PS) at 3400 rpm for on-highway vehicle, and 272 kW (365 hp; 370 PS) at 3800 rpm for marine application.
- Maximum torque:
  - Single turbo non-intercooled: 430 N⋅m (317 lb⋅ft) @ 1600 rpm;
  - Single turbo: 430 N⋅m (317 lb⋅ft) @ 1200-3200 rpm;
  - Twin turbo: 650 N⋅m (479 lb⋅ft) @ 1600-2600 rpm
