= Toyota SA =

The SA was Toyota's first new passenger car design (as opposed to updating the AA) after World War II. It was the first in a family of vehicles before the introduction of the Crown. A series of light trucks also shared the chassis and major components of these passenger cars.

All of these vehicles were sold under the Toyopet name.

== SA ==
Toyopet SA
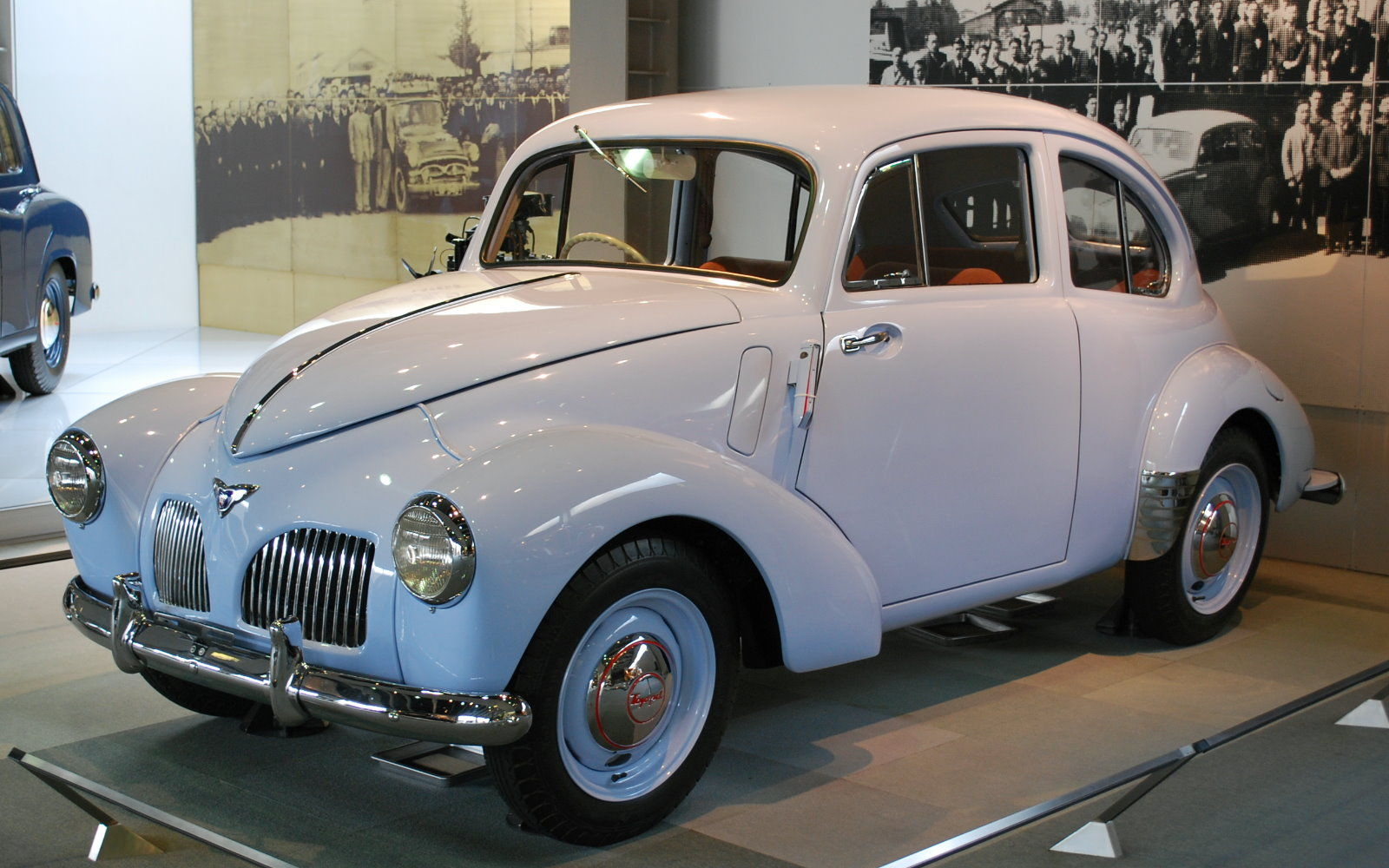

Overview
- Manufacturer: Toyota
- Production: Oct 1947–May 1952
- Assembly: Honsha Plant, Toyota City, Aichi, Japan
- Designer: Dr Kazuo Kumabe

Body and chassis
- Class: large family car
- Body style: sedan
- Layout: front-engine, rear-wheel drive
- Platform: backbone chassis
- Related: SB, SC

Powertrain
- Engine: Type S
- Transmission: 3-speed manual

Dimensions
- Wheelbase: 2,400 mm (94.5 in)
- Length: 3,800 mm (149.6 in)
- Width: 1,590 mm (62.6 in)
- Height: 1,530 mm (60.2 in)
- Curb weight: 1,170 kg (2,579 lb)

Chronology
- Predecessor: AE
- Successor: SD

The SA was Toyota's first true post war design. It differed from all previous Toyota cars by having a 4-cylinder engine (previously a 6-cylinder was used), 4-wheel independent suspension (previously using rigid axles with leaf springs) and a smaller, "ponton" influenced aerodynamic body. The project was driven by Kiichiro Toyoda under the wisdom of his father's (Sakichi Toyoda) words, "Stay ahead of the times" but most of the design work was done by Dr Kazuo Kumabe.

The body was aerodynamic in a style similar to the Volkswagen Beetle. Only a two-door sedan was made, making it unsuitable for the taxi market. The doors were hinged at the rear (often called suicide doors). The front window was a single pane of flat glass with a single wiper mounted above the driver. Only right hand drive was offered.

Toyota engineers (including Dr Kumabe) had visited Germany before World War II and had studied the 16-cylinder Auto Union racing car (independent suspension) and Porsche and Volkswagen designs (independent suspension, aerodynamic bodies, backbone chassis, rear-mounted air-cooled engines, economical production cost). Many Japanese companies had ties with Germany during the war years but most partnered with British or American companies after the war and thus used technologies commonly used in Britain or America. But Toyota did not partner with a foreign company, so it was free to use German designs. Many features of the prototype Beetle were subsequently put into the SA, although the Beetle's rear-mounted air-cooled engine feature was not used. Later on, Toyota revisited the economic principles exemplified by the Beetle when designing the Publica and the Corolla.

=== Dates and production figures ===
Although permission to begin full production of passenger cars in Japan was not granted until 1949, limited numbers of cars were permitted to be built from 1947, and the Toyota SA was one such car. Design work started at the end of 1945 when the GHQ let it be known that authorised commercial production of vehicles for the general public would be commencing soon. This model was introduced in January 1947, with a prototype (which had been under development for more than a year) being completed at that time.

Production occurred from October 1947 through May 1952 (overlapping with the 1949-introduced SD), with a total of only 215 being built. The first car to be produced by Toyota in the postwar period was the AC, which had first been produced in 1943-1944. Fifty were built for government and military use in 1947, and three more were assembled in 1948. Since only 54 cars were built by Toyota in 1947, this leaves four Model SA production cars to be built at the end of that year, not counting the prototype.

Eighteen SA cars were built in 1948, and from 1949 to 1952, 193 more were built. No breakdown exists between models after 1948; only yearly passenger-car grand totals are extant.

=== Mechanicals ===
This model introduced the Type S straight-4 water-cooled engine, conventionally mounted in the front of the car and driving through the rear wheels. Two small grills at the front allowed air for the engine's radiator. Transmission was by a 3-speed manual gearbox and a Hotchkiss drive (previous Toyotas used a torque tube) to a rear-mounted differential. The final drive gear ratio was 7.17:1 .

More unconventional was the use of a backbone chassis and four-wheel independent suspension. A-arm suspension (short upper arm, long lower arm) with coils was used at the front and swing axle suspension with semi-trailing arms, Panhard rods and a transverse semi-elliptical leaf spring was used at the rear.

== SB ==
Toyopet SB

Overview
- Manufacturer: Toyota
- Production: 1947–1952
- Assembly: Japan

Body and chassis
- Class: light truck
- Layout: front-engine, rear-wheel drive
- Platform: ladder frame
- Related: SA, SC

Powertrain
- Engine: 995 cc Type S SV I4
- Transmission: 3-speed manual

Dimensions
- Wheelbase: 2,400 mm (94.5 in)
- Length: 3,950 mm (155.5 in)
- Width: 1,595 mm (62.8 in)
- Height: 1,800 mm (70.9 in)
- Curb weight: 1,050 kg (2,315 lb)

Chronology
- Successor: SG

A light truck using the running gear from the SA but with a ladder chassis and solid axles front and rear, both with semi-elliptical springs. The SB was popular with the general public and also with the American occupation forces, which ordered it in large numbers.

The SB was offered with commercial bodies only but many dealers and owners had sedan bodies made for them. Toyota contracted the Kanto Denki factory to produce a sedan body and wagon on the SB chassis as the SC. There was also a cab-over walk-in van model, the 1952 Toyopet Route Van. The body of the Route Van was built by Shin-Nikkoku Kogyo (now Nissan Shatai), a special-purpose manufacturing company that originally built streetcars and buses.

A small number of police cars were made for the Japanese Police Reserve Force by adding a special body with a canvas top, four canvas doors, and a fold down front window but they were not popular.

=== Dates and production figures ===
Produced from 1947.

=== Mechanicals ===
The SB used the same engine and gearbox as the SA, a three-speed manual and the 1-litre "S"-series engine, producing 27 PS (20 kW) at 4,000 rpm. This was enough for a top speed of 68 km/h (42 mph). A conventional ladder frame chassis was used with conventional semi-elliptical springs and solid axles front and rear.

== SC ==
Toyopet SC

Overview
- Manufacturer: Toyota
- Production: 3 prototypes in 1948
- Assembly: Japan

Body and chassis
- Class: large family car
- Body style: sedan
- Layout: front-engine, rear-wheel drive
- Platform: ladder frame
- Related: SB

Powertrain
- Engine: Type S
- Transmission: 3-speed manual

Chronology
- Predecessor: SA
- Successor: SD

The SB light truck was offered with commercial bodies only but many dealers and owners had sedan bodies made for them. Toyota contracted the Kanto Denki factory to produce a 4-door, 4-seat sedan body and wagon on the SB chassis as the SC. However, production of the SA sedan continued and the SC was not put into production. When production of the SA stopped, a revised version of the SC was made as the SD.

=== Dates and production figures ===
3 prototypes were built but the SC did not go into production.

=== Mechanicals ===
Same as the SB except for independent front suspension.

== SD ==
Toyopet SD

Overview
- Manufacturer: Toyota
- Production: Nov 1949–1951
- Assembly: Japan

Body and chassis
- Class: family car
- Body style: sedan
- Layout: front-engine, rear-wheel drive
- Platform: ladder frame
- Related: SB

Powertrain
- Engine: Type S
- Transmission: 3-speed manual

Chronology
- Predecessor: SA
- Successor: SF

A 5-seater passenger car using the same chassis and suspension as the SB.

=== Dates and production figures ===
Produced from November 1949 until 1951.

=== Mechanicals ===
Same as the SB.

== SF ==
Toyopet SF

Overview
- Manufacturer: Toyota
- Production: Oct 1951–1953
- Assembly: Japan

Body and chassis
- Class: large family car
- Body style: sedan
- Layout: front-engine, rear-wheel drive
- Platform: ladder frame
- Related: SG

Powertrain
- Engine: Type S
- Transmission: 3-speed manual

Dimensions
- Wheelbase: 2500 mm
- Length: 4,280 mm (168.5 in)
- Width: 1,590 mm (62.6 in)
- Height: 1,600 mm (63.0 in)
- Curb weight: 1,250 kg (2,756 lb)

Chronology
- Predecessor: SD
- Successor: RH

An update to the SD. This sold in considerably higher numbers than any of its predecessors, mainly due to increasing demand for taxis.

=== Dates and production figures ===
Produced from October 1951 until 1953. 3,653 were built.

=== Mechanicals ===
Same as the SD.

== SG ==
Toyopet SG
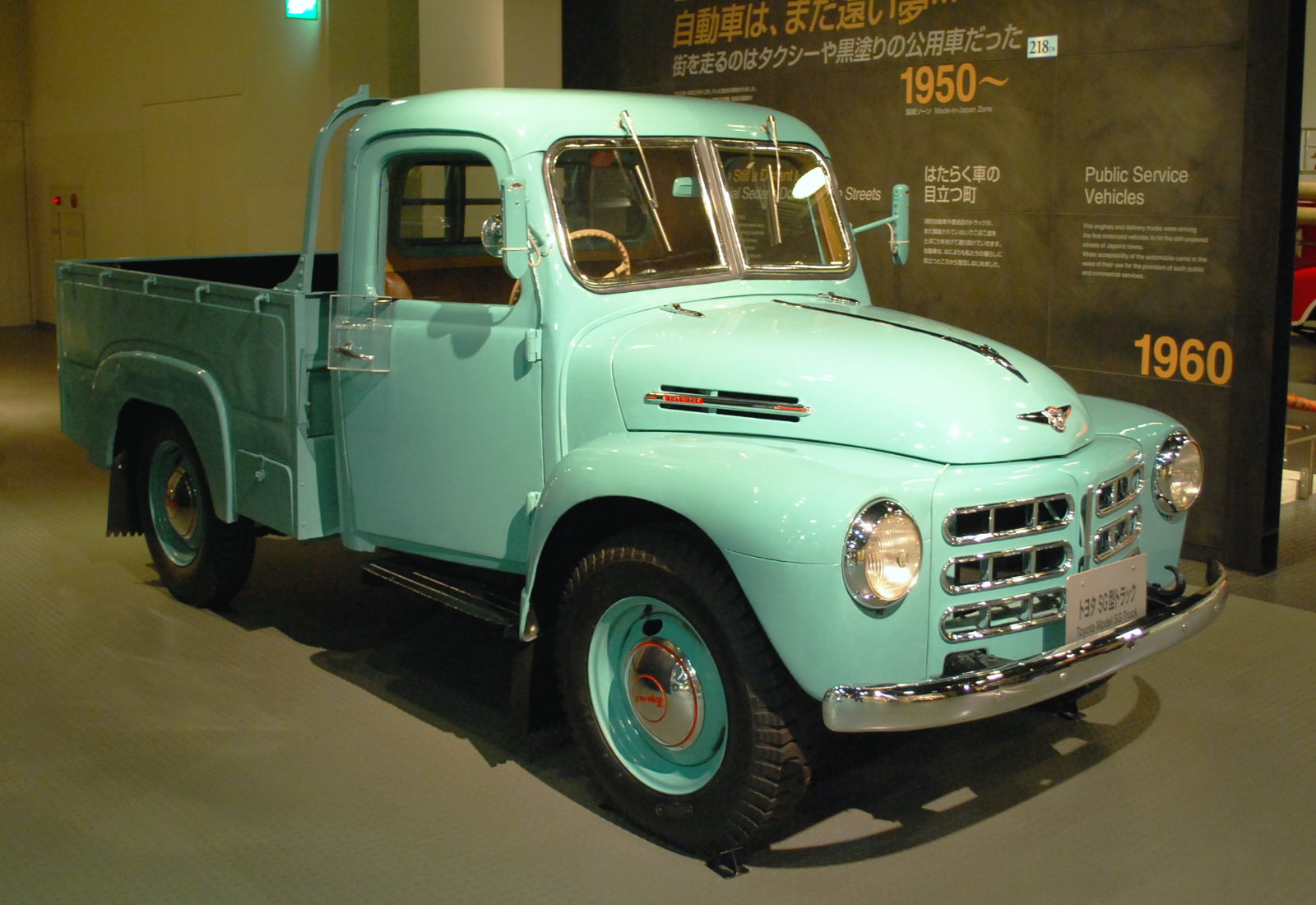

Overview
- Manufacturer: Toyota
- Production: Mar 1952–1954
- Assembly: Japan

Body and chassis
- Class: light truck
- Layout: front-engine, rear-wheel drive
- Platform: ladder frame

Powertrain
- Engine: Type S
- Transmission: 3-speed manual

Dimensions
- Wheelbase: 2500 mm
- Length: 4,195 mm (165.2 in)
- Width: 1,595 mm (62.8 in)
- Height: 1,735 mm (68.3 in)
- Curb weight: 1,170 kg (2,579 lb)

Chronology
- Predecessor: SB
- Successor: RK

An update to the SB, sharing components with the SF.

=== Dates and production figures ===
Produced from March 1952 until 1954.

=== Mechanicals ===
Same as the SF.

== RH series ==
Toyopet RH
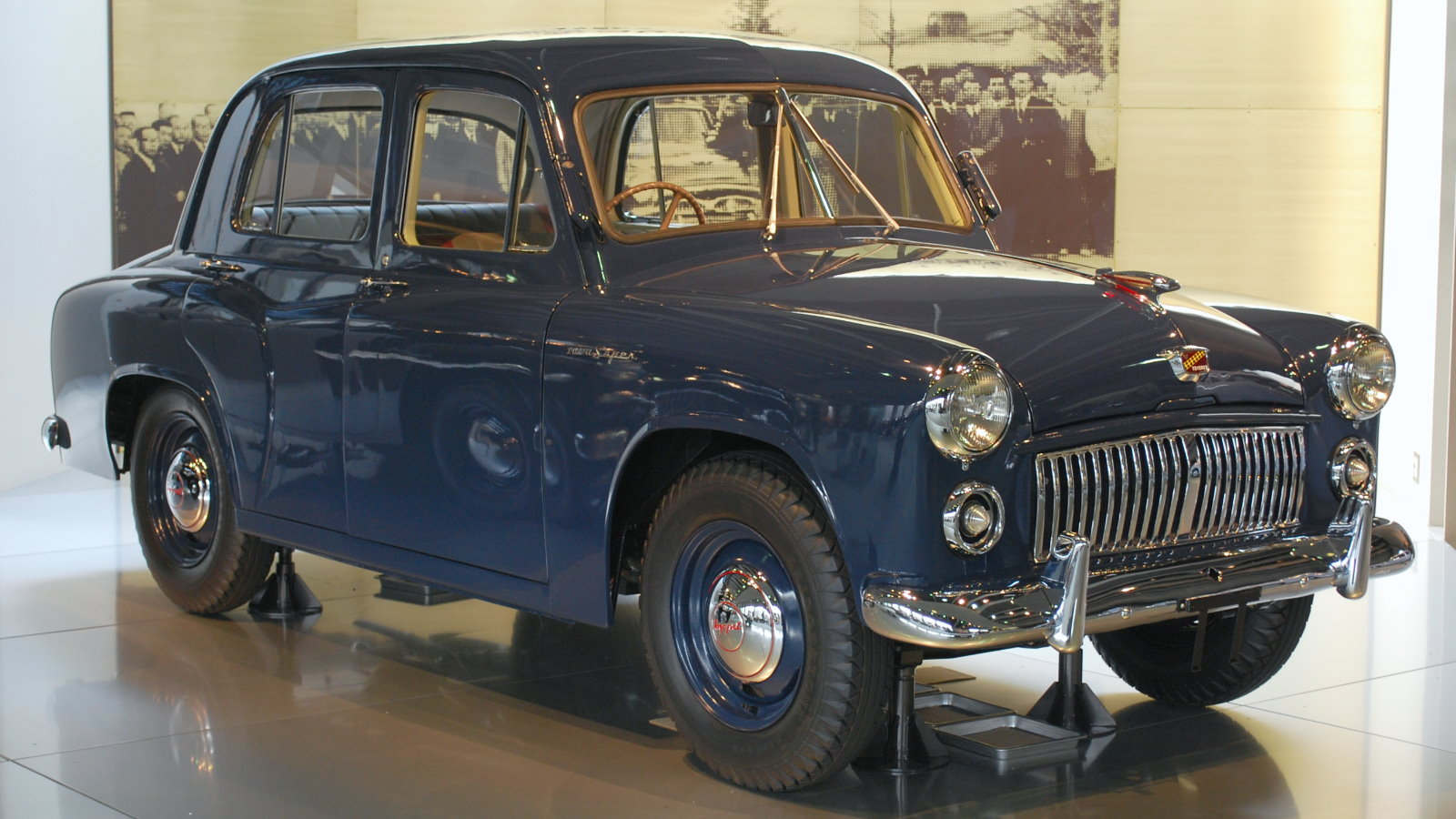

Overview
- Manufacturer: Toyota
- Also called: Toyopet Super; Toyopet BHR/BH26/28; Toyopet RHK/RHN; Toyopet SH
- Production: Sep 1953–1955
- Assembly: Japan

Body and chassis
- Class: large family car
- Body style: sedan
- Layout: front-engine, rear-wheel drive
- Platform: ladder frame
- Related: FHJ; FH24

Powertrain
- Engine: 995 cc type S SV I4; 1453 cc type R OHV I4; 3386 cc type B I6
- Transmission: 4-speed unsynchronized manual

Chronology
- Predecessor: Toyota SF
- Successor: Toyota Crown; Toyopet Master

A further update to the SF but with the newly designed 1.5 litre Type R engine. The RHN's body was made by the New Mitsubishi Heavy Industrial Manufacturing Co. and the RHK's body was made by Kanto Auto Works, Ltd. The transmission was a four-speed manual sliding mesh unit.

The BHR police patrol car sedan was made from the four-cylinder RH sedan by using the Type B six-cylinder engine and a longer front end. This later became the BH26 patrol by using the Crown RS body with the same RH chassis, Type B engine and BHR extended front end. Similarly, the BH28 ambulance was made by converting the BH26 police sedan into a van body. Even later, the Type B engine was upgraded to the F engine and they were renamed as the FH26 and FH28.

The RH was succeeded by the similar 1955 RR Master and the much more modern 1955 RS Crown.

The one-litre SH version equipped with the type S engine was also produced. The 1500 cc version was named Toyopet Super and the 1000 cc version was named Toyopet Custom but found few takers.

=== Dates and production figures ===
Produced from September 1953 to 1955, 5,845 RHs were built. On the other hand, 230 SHs (1000 cc "Custom" version) were built.

=== Mechanicals ===
Same as the SF except for the new Type R engine.

== FHJ ==
Toyopet FHJ

Overview
- Manufacturer: Toyota
- Assembly: Japan

Body and chassis
- Class: light truck
- Body style: fire appliance
- Layout: front-engine, rear-wheel drive
- Platform: ladder frame
- Related: RH

Powertrain
- Engine: Type F

Dimensions
- Length: 4,540 mm (178.7 in)
- Width: 1,680 mm (66.1 in)
- Height: 1,870 mm (73.6 in)
- Curb weight: 965 kg (2,127 lb)

Chronology
- Successor: FH24

The FHJ was a fire appliance vehicle built based on the RH but with the much larger Type F engine. This was sold at the same time as the FAJ (based on the heavy duty FA truck), the FCJ (based on the medium duty FC truck) and the FJJ (based on the BJ Jeep).

=== Mechanicals ===
Same as the RH except for the Type F engine. The front body was based on the SG light truck, there were no doors and the rear of the body was heavily customised with typical fire appliance accessories (e.g. hoses, axes, ride-on steps, grab bars). In spite of looking like a small truck, the FHJ still used the single rear wheels of the RH passenger car.

== FH24 ==
Toyopet FHJ FH24
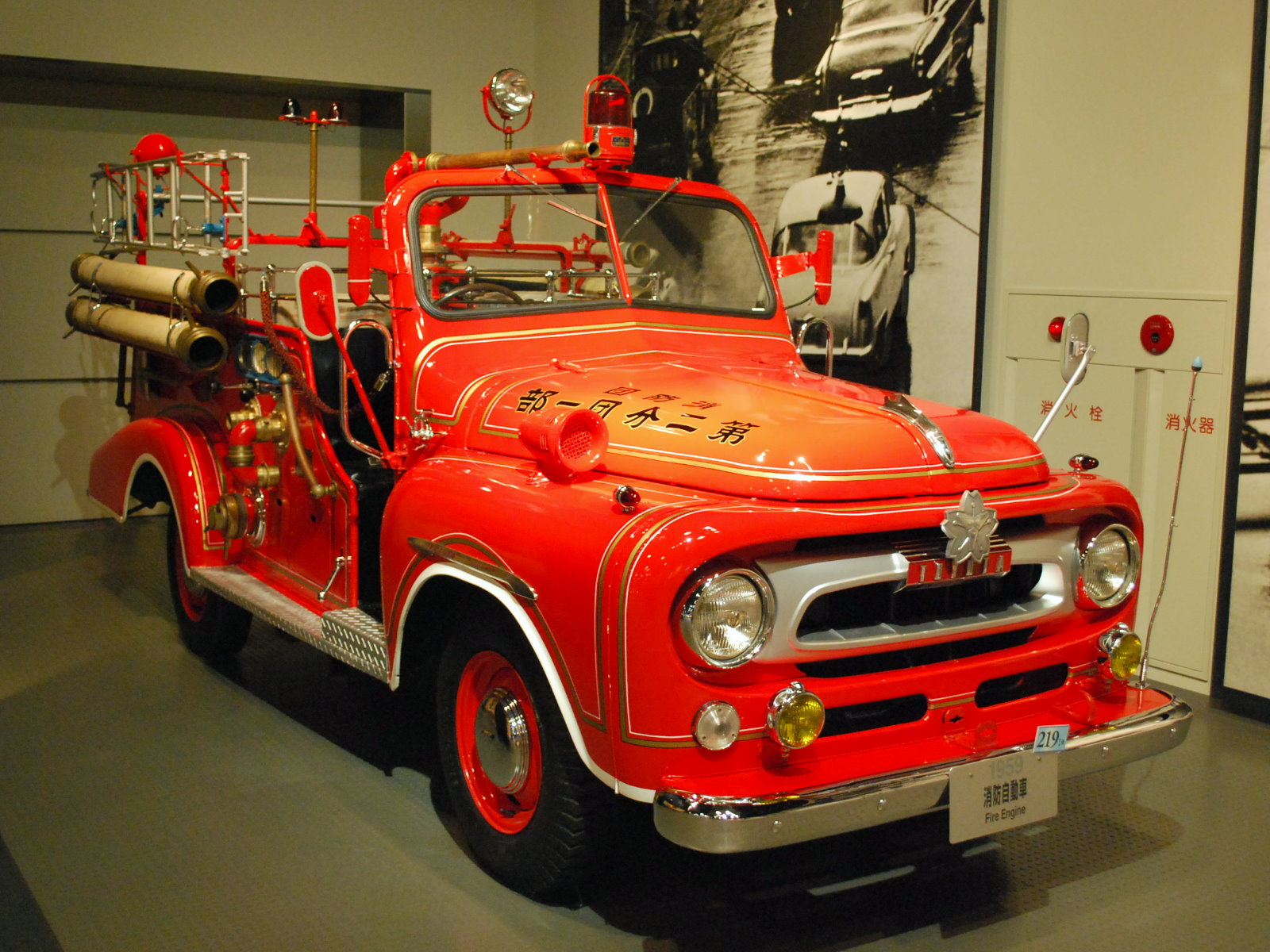

Overview
- Manufacturer: Toyota
- Assembly: Japan

Body and chassis
- Class: light truck
- Body style: fire appliance
- Layout: front-engine, rear-wheel drive
- Platform: ladder frame
- Related: RH

Powertrain
- Engine: Type F

Chronology
- Predecessor: FHJ

The FH24 was a fire appliance vehicle built based on the RH but with the much larger Type F engine. It was very similar to the earlier FHJ fire appliance.

=== Mechanicals ===
Same as the RH except for the Type F engine. The front body was based on the SG light truck, there were no doors and the rear of the body was heavily customised with typical fire appliance accessories (e.g. hoses, axes, ride-on steps, grab bars). In spite of looking like a small truck, the FH24 still used the single rear wheels of the RH passenger car.
