= Toyota Classic =

Toyota Classic (YN86)
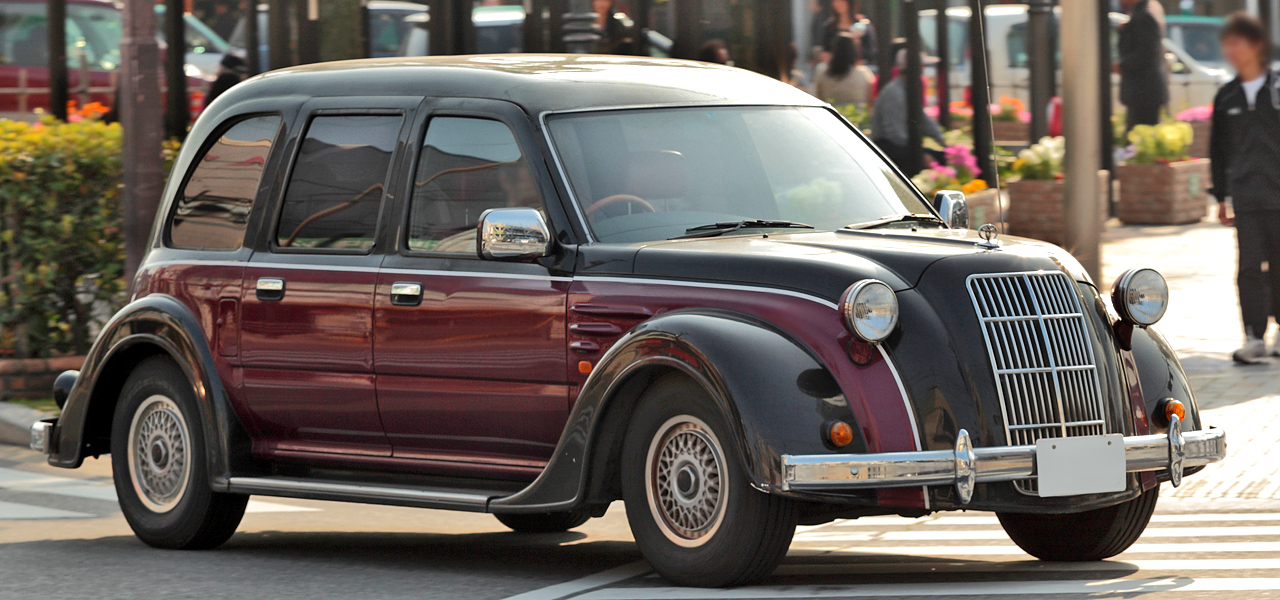

Overview
- Manufacturer: Toyota
- Production: 1996; 100 produced

Body and chassis
- Class: Executive-Luxury car (E/F)
- Body style: 4-door sedan
- Layout: FR layout
- Related: Toyota Hilux (N80)

Powertrain
- Engine: 2.0-litre 3Y-E OHV I4
- Transmission: 4-speed automatic; 5-speed column-shift manual

Dimensions
- Wheelbase: 2,850 mm (112.2 in)
- Length: 4,885 mm (192.3 in)
- Width: 1,735 mm (68.3 in)
- Height: 1,650 mm (65.0 in)
- Curb weight: 1,480 kg (3,263 lb)

Chronology
- Predecessor: Toyota AC

The Toyota Classic is a limited-production luxury car produced by Japanese manufacturer Toyota in 1996. It was styled after the Toyota AA of the 1930s–1940s (which was a visual copy of the Chrysler Airflow). It used a fifth generation Toyota Hilux, type GA-YN86 rear-wheel-drive frame, with a 2-litre 3Y-E petrol engine producing 96 hp (72 kW) and 118 lbf⋅ft (160 N⋅m). Its interior was taken from a contemporary Toyota, but made more consistent with the car's exterior by the addition of wood to the dashboard and leather to the seats. (This was similar to the work carried out by companies such as Mitsuoka.) Toyota sold 100 cars and charged roughly US$75,000 for each of them.

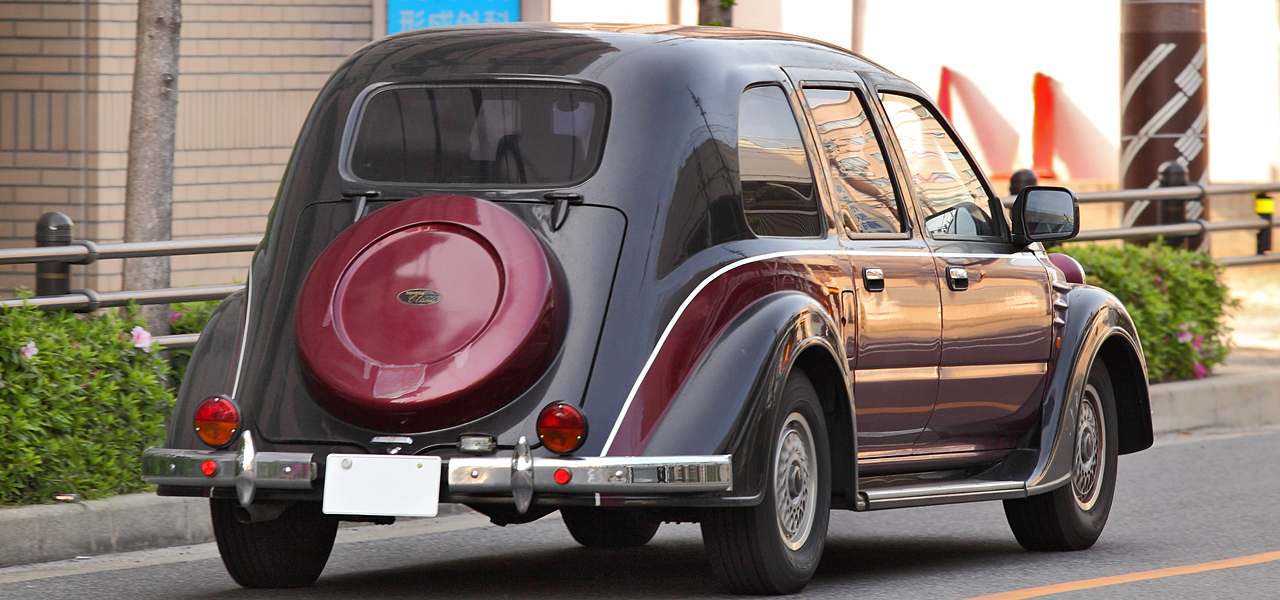
Rear view

The Classic arose as part of the boom in retro-style automobiles, and also perhaps as a celebration of the 60th anniversary of the Toyota AA. The Toyota Origin of 2000 was a similar model resembling the first Toyota Crown.
