= Toyota AA =

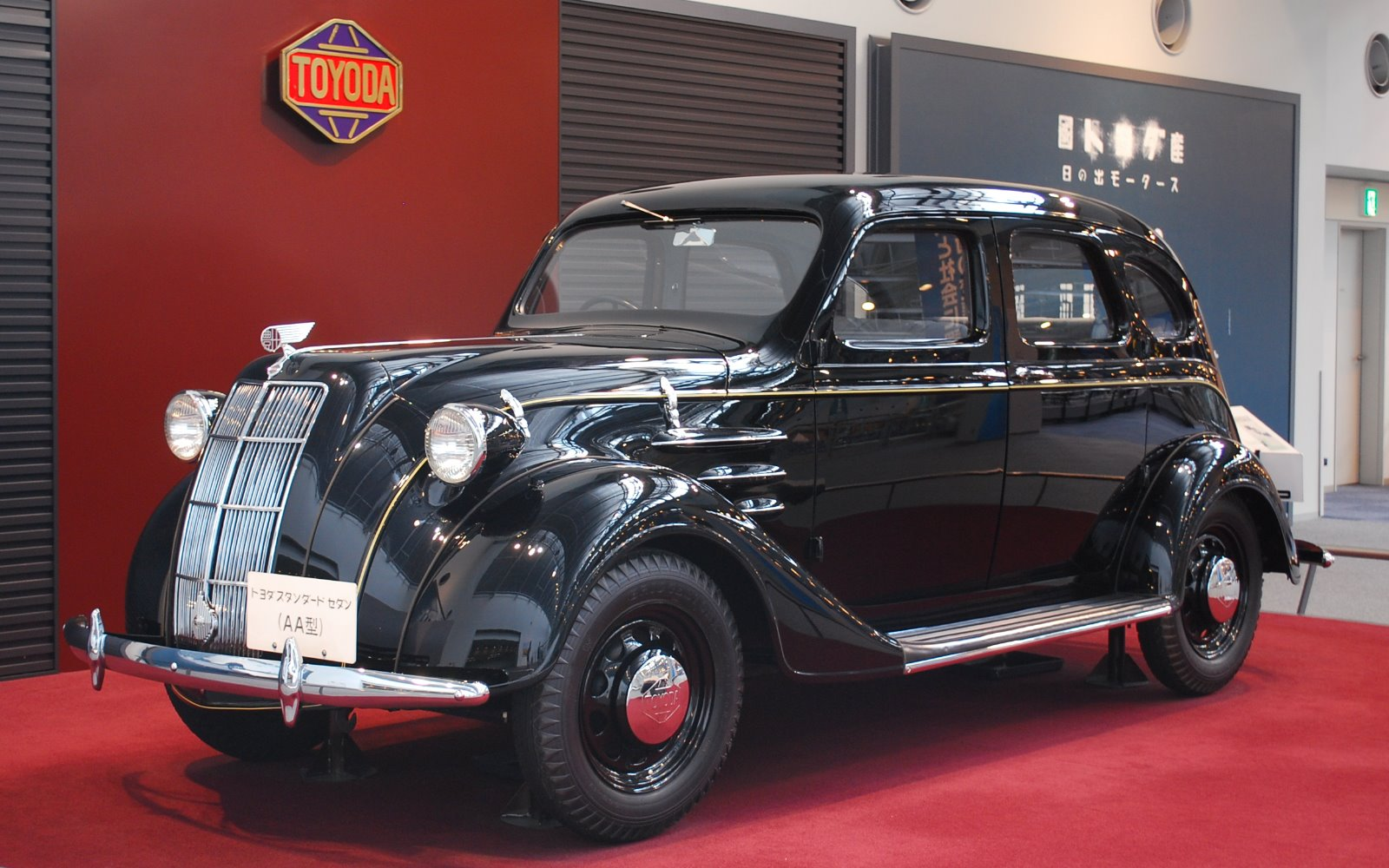
Replica of 1936 Toyota AA Standard Sedan

The A1 was the first prototype passenger car built by the company that became Toyota. It was redesigned and put into production as Toyota's first production cars, the AA sedan and the AB cabriolet. These were succeeded by the similar AE, AC and BA sedans.

The series as a whole was replaced by the quite different and much more advanced SA.

== A1 ==
Toyota A1

Overview
- Manufacturer: Toyota
- Production: 1935 (3 prototypes)
- Assembly: Koromo, Japan

Body and chassis
- Class: full-size car
- Body style: Sedan
- Layout: FR layout
- Related: Toyota G1

Powertrain
- Engine: 3.4L Type A I6
- Transmission: 3-speed manual

Chronology
- Successor: Toyota AA

Three A1 prototypes were completed in May 1935, however none of them have survived. The prototypes were blessed in a Buddhist ceremony, and Kiichiro Toyoda then drove one of them to the grave of Sakichi Toyoda, his father, who gave him the seed money to start a car factory.

After completion of the prototypes, Toyota then switched its attention to the G1 truck because it was more likely to be profitable in the short term. After the G1 was in production, the company was able to spend resources on developing the AA and AB passenger cars.

=== Dates ===
The A1 prototypes were completed in May 1935.

=== Mechanicals ===
The A1 used the 3,389 cc (206.8 cu in) Type A Overhead valve 6-cylinder engine producing 62 horsepower (46 kW) with a 3-speed column-shift manual gearbox.

The Type A engine was copied from a purchased and reverse engineered 1933 Chevrolet Master, and the chassis and electrics were copied from Ford.

Solid axles were used at both ends. Pressed metal discs were used for all 4 wheel rims (which was very modern for the time). Braking was by drums.

The mechanicals were the same as used in the production AA, AB and G1 vehicles.

=== Body ===
The A1 was a fully enclosed, 4-door sedan, with conventional front-hinged front doors and rear-hinged suicide-style rear doors. It was heavily based on the Chrysler built DeSoto Airflow, which was a reflection of Art Deco and streamlined appearances. Toyoda bought an Airflow and disassembled it the year before producing the A1. The front window was a single piece of flat glass with a top-mounted wiper on the driver's side. There were 3 windows per side, one for the front door (without a quarter light window), one for the rear door and one behind the rear door. A spare tyre was mounted on the nearly vertical boot lid.

The A1 was available only as a right-hand-drive vehicle.

== AA/AB ==
Toyota AA/Toyota AB
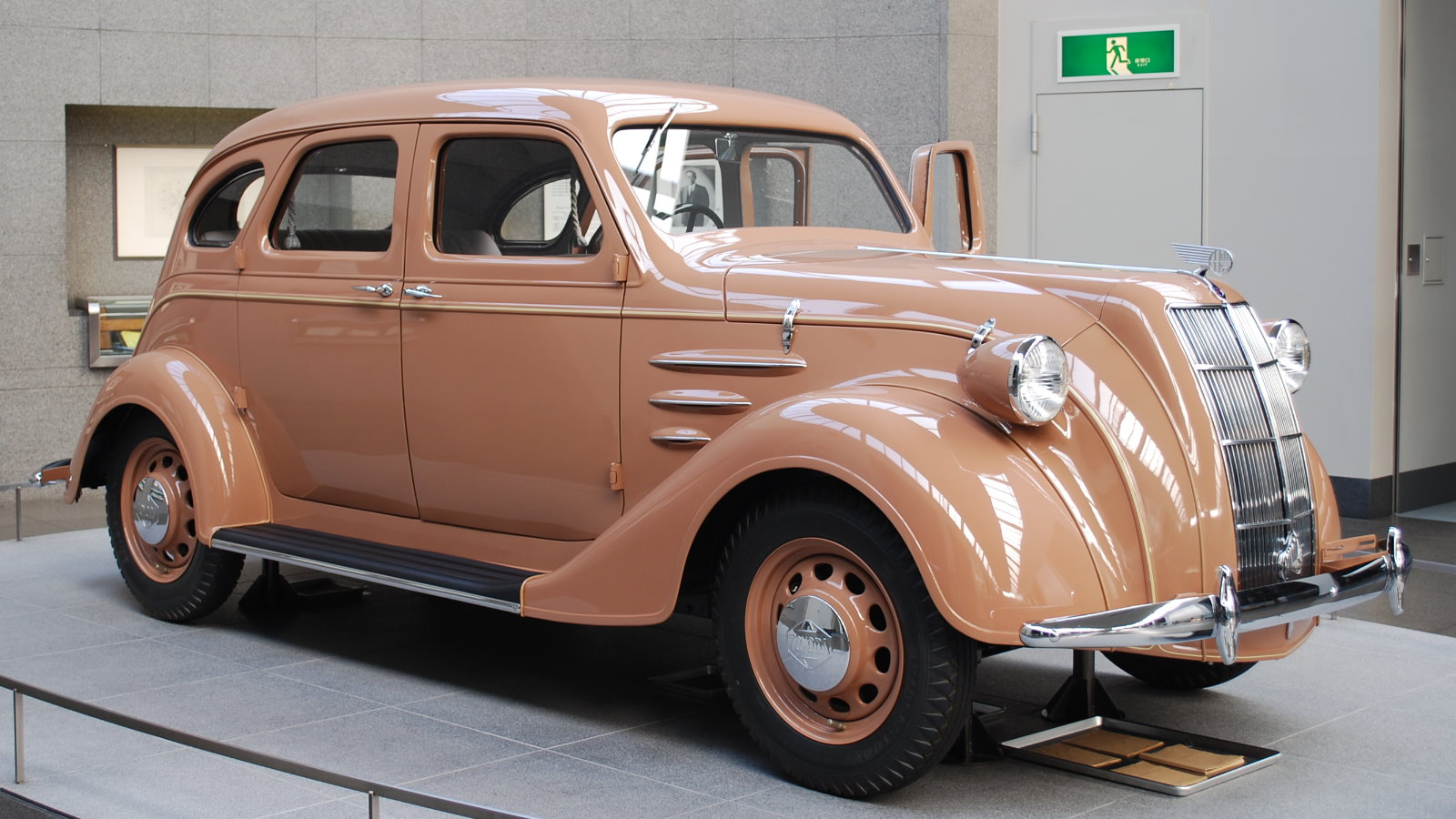
- 1936 Toyota AA official replica by Toyota

Overview
- Manufacturer: Toyota
- Production: 1936–1943
- Assembly: Koromo, Japan

Body and chassis
- Class: full-size car
- Body style: 4-door sedan (AA); 4-door convertible (AB)
- Layout: Front-engine, rear-wheel-drive

Powertrain
- Engine: 3.4 L Type A I6 (original)
- Transmission: 3-speed manual

Dimensions
- Wheelbase: 2,851 mm (112.2 in)
- Length: 4,737 mm (186.5 in)
- Width: 1,734 mm (68.3 in)
- Height: 1,737 mm (68.4 in)
- Curb weight: 1,500 kg (3,307 lb)

Chronology
- Predecessor: Toyota A1
- Successor: Toyota AC

The AA was similar to the A1 prototypes with only minor changes.

=== Dates and production figures ===
A total of 1,404 AA sedans were produced from 1936 to 1943, when the model was replaced by the more austere AC.

A total of 353 AB convertible, including the military ABR version, was produced from 1936 to 1942. There was no direct replacement.

=== Body types ===
Like the previous model, the AA was a fully enclosed 4-door sedan that largely copied the design of the Chrysler built DeSoto Airflow. It had a metal body on a metal ladder chassis. The metal body was of modern construction compared to the fabric-over-wooden-frame bodies used on cars designed in the 1920s. The rear doors opened backwards as suicide doors. The front glass spanned the entire width of the body in a single pane.

The AB was identical to the AA except that it was a convertible with a folding cloth roof, the rear doors opened forwards like conventional doors and the front glass could fold down onto the engine compartment.

=== Mechanicals ===
The mechanicals were the same as used in the A1 prototype.

=== 50th year replica ===
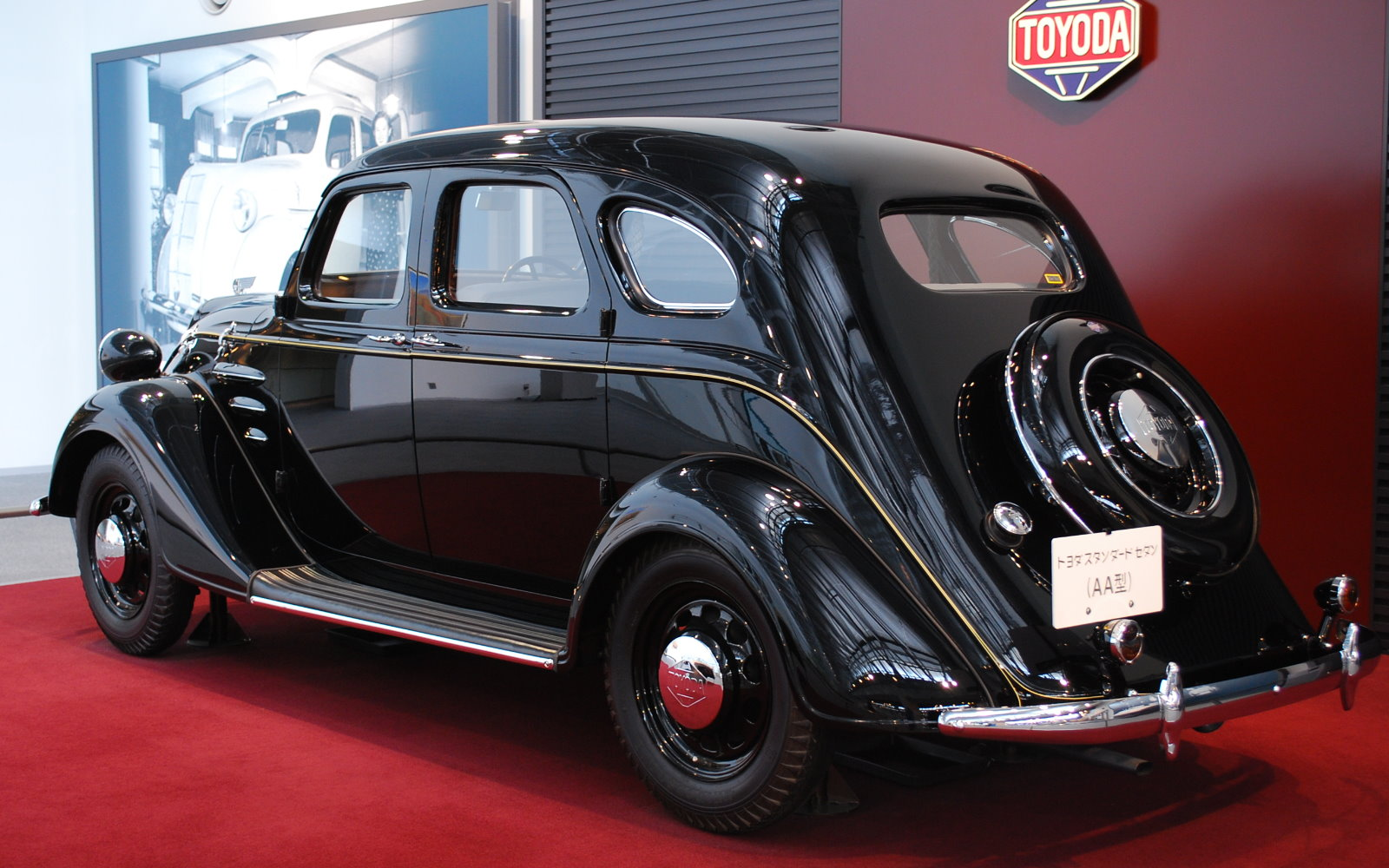
1936 Toyota AA official replica by Toyota rear view

Toyota wanted to use an AA for its 50th birthday in 1987 but couldn't find any surviving examples. Toyota decided to build a replica but even for that there were no complete and consistent plans. Plans that could be found were from various points during the car's development process and in any case were often incomplete and lacking by today's standards. However, a single replica was built that is believed to be representative of the AA. The replica uses the 2.3-liter Toyota 2M straight-six engine. This replica is now in the Toyota Automobile Museum.

=== Discovery of the oldest known AA ===
In 2008 an original AA was found in Vladivostok, Russia in derelict and heavily modified condition, with the undercarriage and drivetrain from a GAZ-51 truck. It is now displayed, still in this condition, in the Louwman Museum in the Netherlands. The car was apparently used by a local family for their farm until the 1990s (without them actually knowing its value) before it faced engine problems and was placed in an old barn, where it was later discovered by a 25-year-old student who called the museum. It is unknown how the car ever got to Russia.

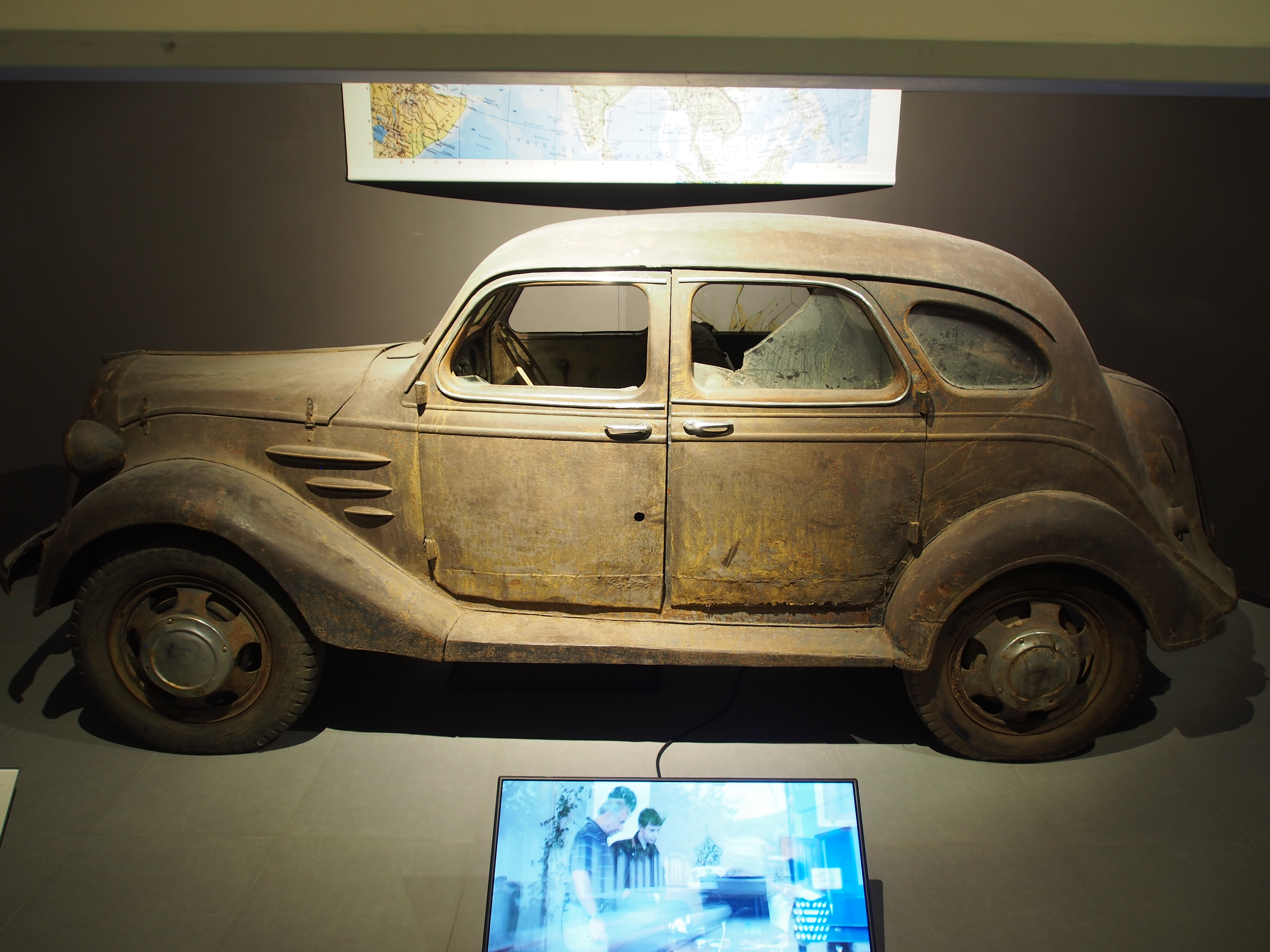
Model AA at the Louwman Museum

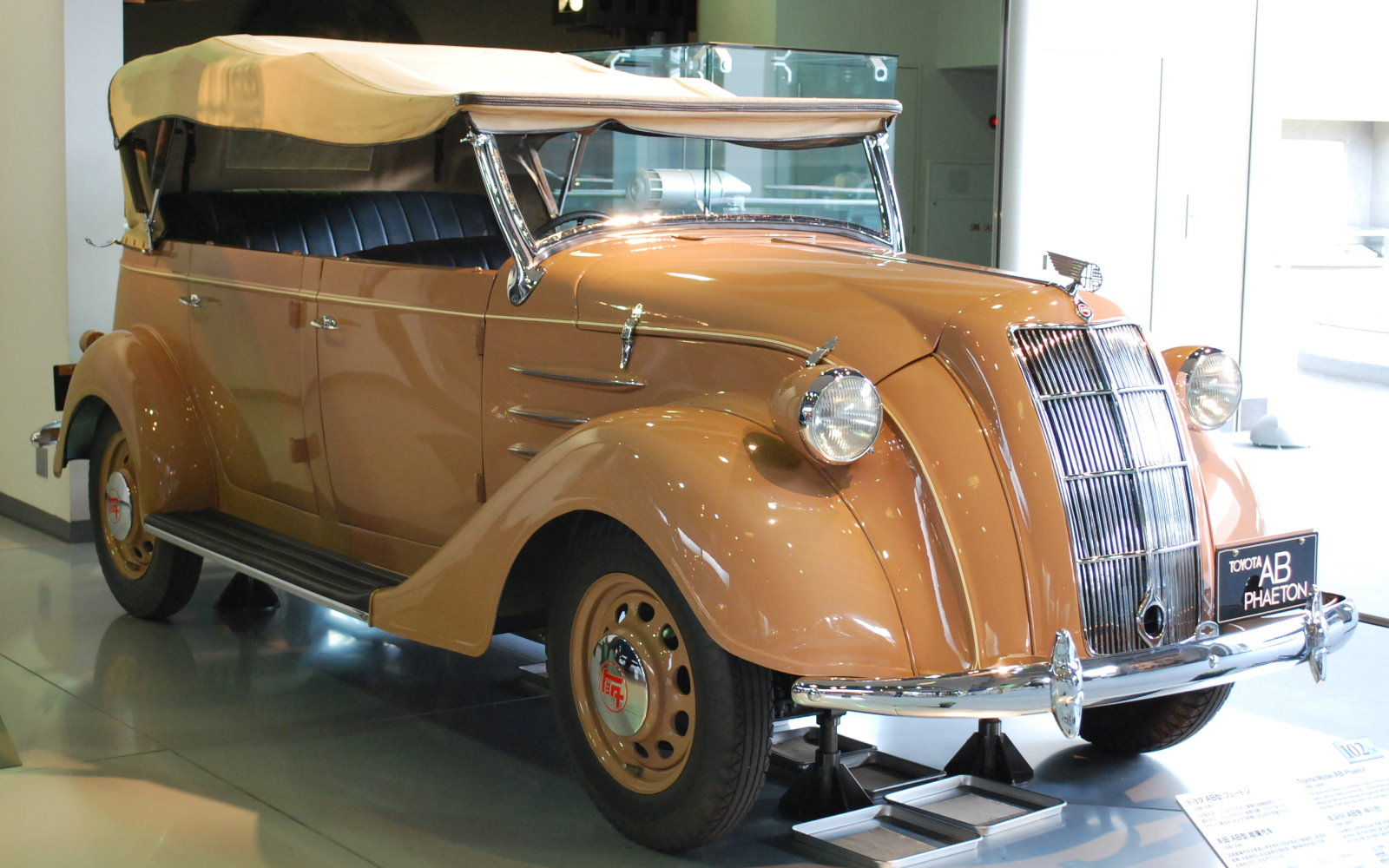
1936 Model AB Convertible

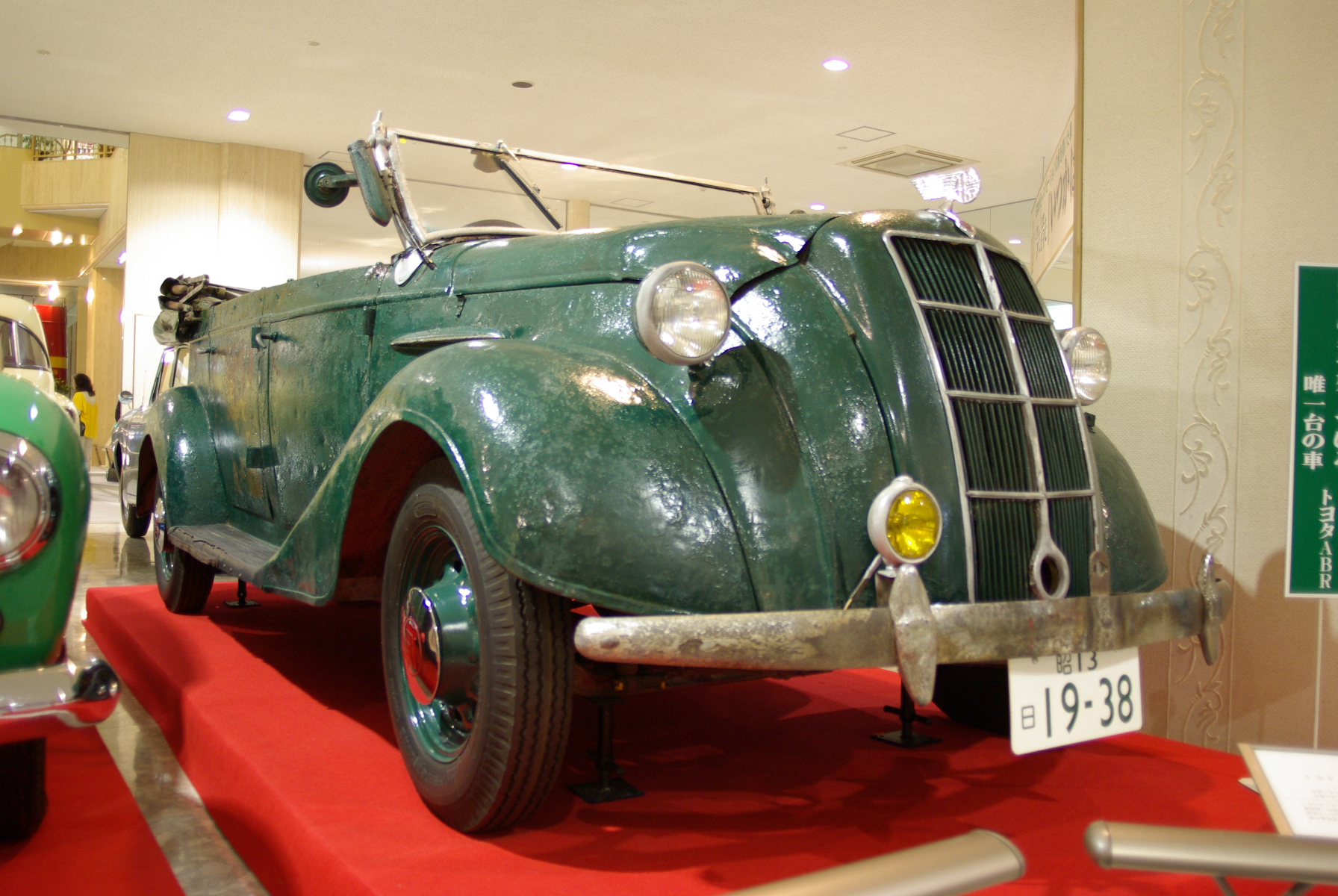
1938 Model ABR

== AC ==
Toyota AC
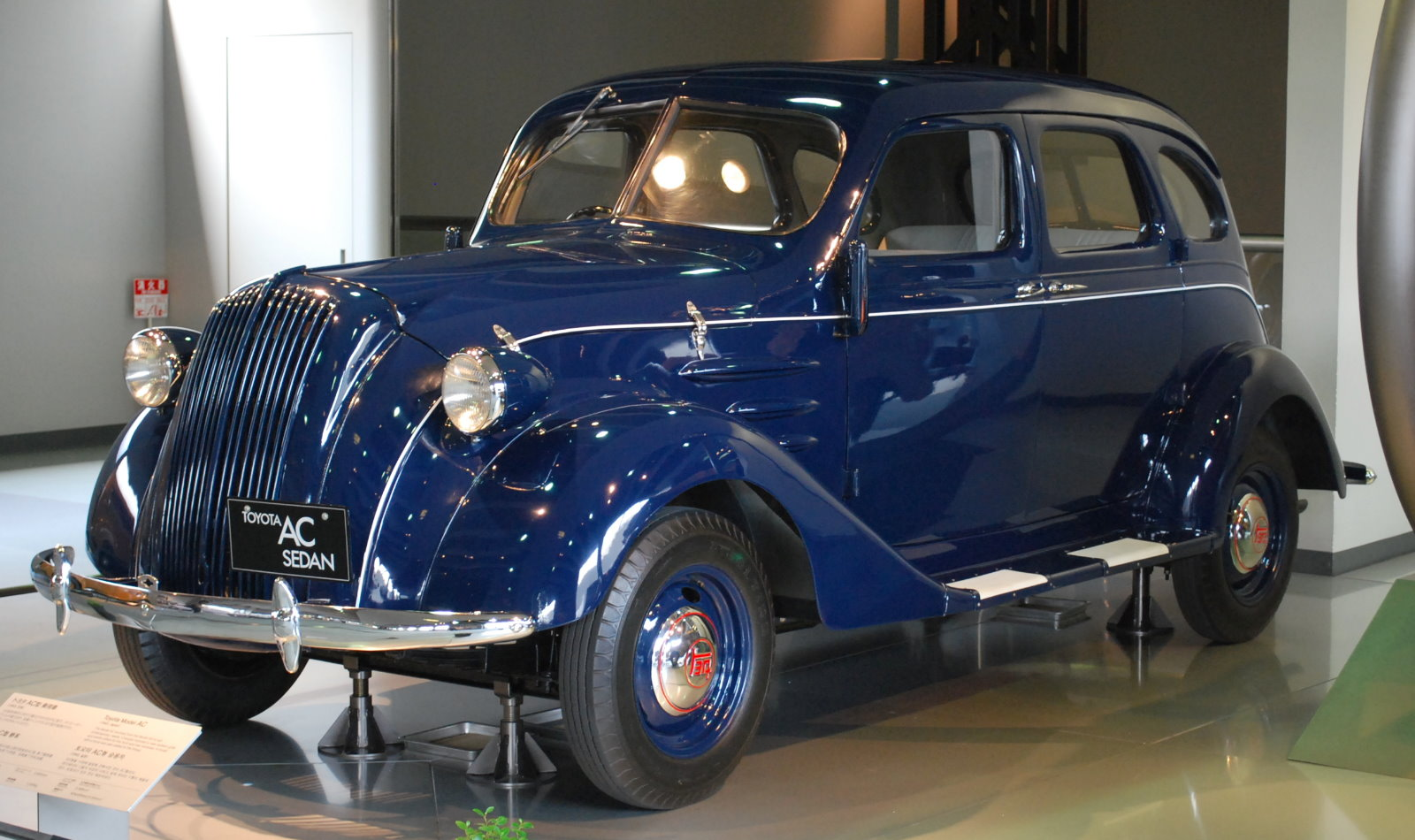

Overview
- Manufacturer: Toyota
- Production: 1943–1944, 1947–1948

Body and chassis
- Class: full-size car
- Body style: 4-door sedan
- Layout: FR layout

Powertrain
- Engine: 3.4L Type B I6
- Transmission: 3-speed manual

Dimensions
- Wheelbase: 2,850 mm (112.2 in)
- Length: 4,884 mm (192.3 in)
- Width: 1,734 mm (68.3 in)
- Height: 1,746 mm (68.7 in)
- Curb weight: 1,550 kg (3,417.2 lb)

Chronology
- Predecessor: Toyota AA and AB

The AC was similar to the AA, with only minor alternations to the body. The front glass was now a split into left and right halves with thick metal body work between them.

=== Dates and production figures ===
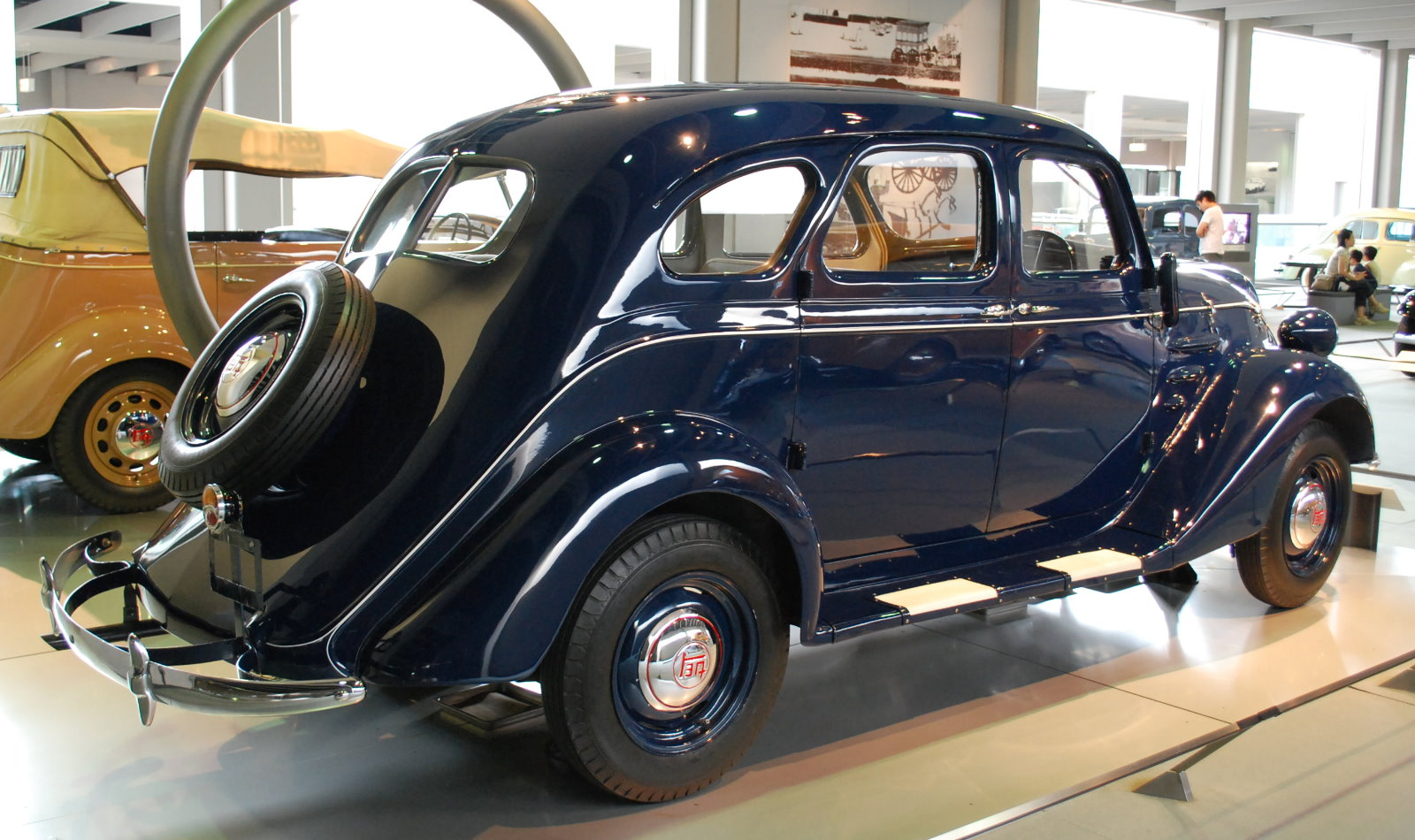
1943 Toyota Model AC rear view

Design work began in 1938. A total of 115 AC sedans was produced from 1943 until 1948 with no direct replacement as production efforts focused on the much smaller SA. Forty-three were produced in 1943, 19 in 1944 (until February), and 50 units were made from spares in 1947 for a military order, with a final three being built in 1948. No Toyota passenger car production occurred in the years 1945 and 1946, although what would become the first post-war car, the SA, was in development during these years.

During the retro craze of the 1990s-2000s, Toyota would capitalize on the styling of the original AA/AB/AC series to create the Toyota Classic. Based on the Toyota Hilux chassis, the Classic incorporated classic sedan styling with streamlined features but modern amenities. Nevertheless, no more than 100 vehicles were ever produced and today it is very rare.

=== Mechanicals ===
The mechanicals were similar to the AA and AB.

== AE ==
Toyota AE

Overview
- Manufacturer: Toyota
- Production: 1941–1943

Body and chassis
- Class: medium size family car
- Body style: sedan
- Layout: FR layout

Powertrain
- Engine: 2.3 L Type C I4
- Transmission: 3-speed manual

Dimensions
- Wheelbase: 2,500 mm (98.4 in)
- Length: 4,500 mm (177.2 in)
- Width: 1,730 mm (68.1 in)
- Height: 1,635 mm (64.4 in)
- Curb weight: 1,220 kg (2,689.6 lb)

The AE sedan was a smaller car than the related AA, AB, and AC models.

=== Dates and production figures ===
The AE was developed during 1939, and a prototype was completed in September of that year. The model was introduced at the beginning of 1940. However, production occurred from 1941 to 1943. Only 76 of this model were built.

=== Mechanicals ===
The mechanicals were similar to the AA except that it had the Type C engine, which was a Type A with two cylinders removed.

== Prototypes not put into production ==
=== EA ===
Toyota EA

Overview
- Manufacturer: Toyota
- Production: 1938 (prototypes)
- Assembly: Koromo, Japan

Body and chassis
- Class: Subcompact family car
- Body style: 2-door saloon
- Layout: FF layout
- Related: DKW F7

Powertrain
- Engine: 585 cc Type E I2 two-stroke

Dimensions
- Wheelbase: 2,610 mm (102.8 in)
- Length: 3,220 mm (126.8 in)
- Width: 1,300 mm (51.2 in)
- Height: 1,250 mm (49.2 in)
- Curb weight: 650 kg (1,433 lb)

Kiichiro Toyoda designed the EA as a copy of the DKW F7 sedan in 1938 but production was prevented by war time restrictions.

==== Dates and production figures ====
The EA was designed in 1938 but did not go into production.

==== Mechanicals ====
A small front-mounted, 2-cylinder, 2-stroke Type E engine connected as front-wheel drive.

=== EB ===
The EB was a rear-wheel-drive minicar derived from the DKW-inspired EA type, but production was prevented by wartime restrictions.

==== Dates and production figures ====
The EB was designed in 1938 but did not go into production.

==== Mechanicals ====
A small front-mounted, 2-cylinder, 2-stroke Type E engine installed at the front and driving the rear wheels.

=== BA ===
The BA was an austerity sedan, and used wood in its framing to conserve metal. This model is said to have been based on the Volvo PV 60, but this is open to question, since the PV60 was not introduced until 1944, and did not enter production until 1946. Most of the prototypes of this Volvo were built in the 1942–1944 period. There is anecdotal information regarding a 1939 PV60 prototype, but the data is sketchy and no photos exist.

==== Dates and production figures ====
The BA was introduced and first produced in 1940. No more than 17 were built. Some sources, however, claim the model did not enter production, such as it was, until 1943, with one giving the date of June 1943. But judging from 1943's production figures, the majority of which would have to represent the AC, it would not seem to be the case that all 17 BA production cars were built that year. The production of the 17 cars may have occurred in 1940 and 1943, or perhaps it was stretched over the 1940–1943 period, with the last few being completed in 1943, when the model was said to have started "official" production. Support for the notion that at least a few of these cars were produced in 1943 would come from a photograph (obtained from Toyota Motor Co. Ltd.) of a BA captioned as "1943 Totoya Model BA 4-cylinder saloon" in at least one source.

=== BB phaeton ===
One example of the Model BB phaeton was built, in 1941. It resembled a contemporary Chevrolet.

=== B/BC ===
Two or three examples of a luxury sedan, known as the Model B (or Model BC, according to one source), were built. Although one source associates this model with the year 1942, most claim the prototypes were built in 1944. This was the last passenger car development until after the war ended.

== Toyota passenger car production from 1935 to 1949 ==
The following table is a portion of that put out by Toyota, and represents passenger car production only, apparently not including prototypes:

| 1935 | 1936 | 1937 | 1938 | 1939 | 1940 | 1941 | 1942 | 1943 | 1944 | 1945 | 1946 | 1947 | 1948 | 1949 |
|---|---|---|---|---|---|---|---|---|---|---|---|---|---|---|
| 0 | 100 | 577 | 539 | 107 | 268 | 208 | 41 | 53 | 19 | 0 | 0 | 54 | 21 | 235 |
