= Toyota Type A engine =

The Type A engine was a straight-six engine produced from 1935 through 1947 by Toyota and is a copy of the 1933 Chevrolet Stovebolt 207 engine.

The Type B was a technically more advanced version of the Type A. There was an enlarged version of this, called the Type D, but it did not enter production.

The Type C was a straight-four engine derived from the Type A.

Many parts were interchangeable between the Type A, Type B and Type C engines (e.g. pistons, valves, rods). Many of the same parts were also interchangeable with the 1930s Chevrolet First generation Stovebolt engines, from which it was derived.

The Type E was a copy of a DKW engine.

The Type S was a straight-four engine that replaced the Type A, B and C in Toyota's passenger cars.

== Type A ==
Type A
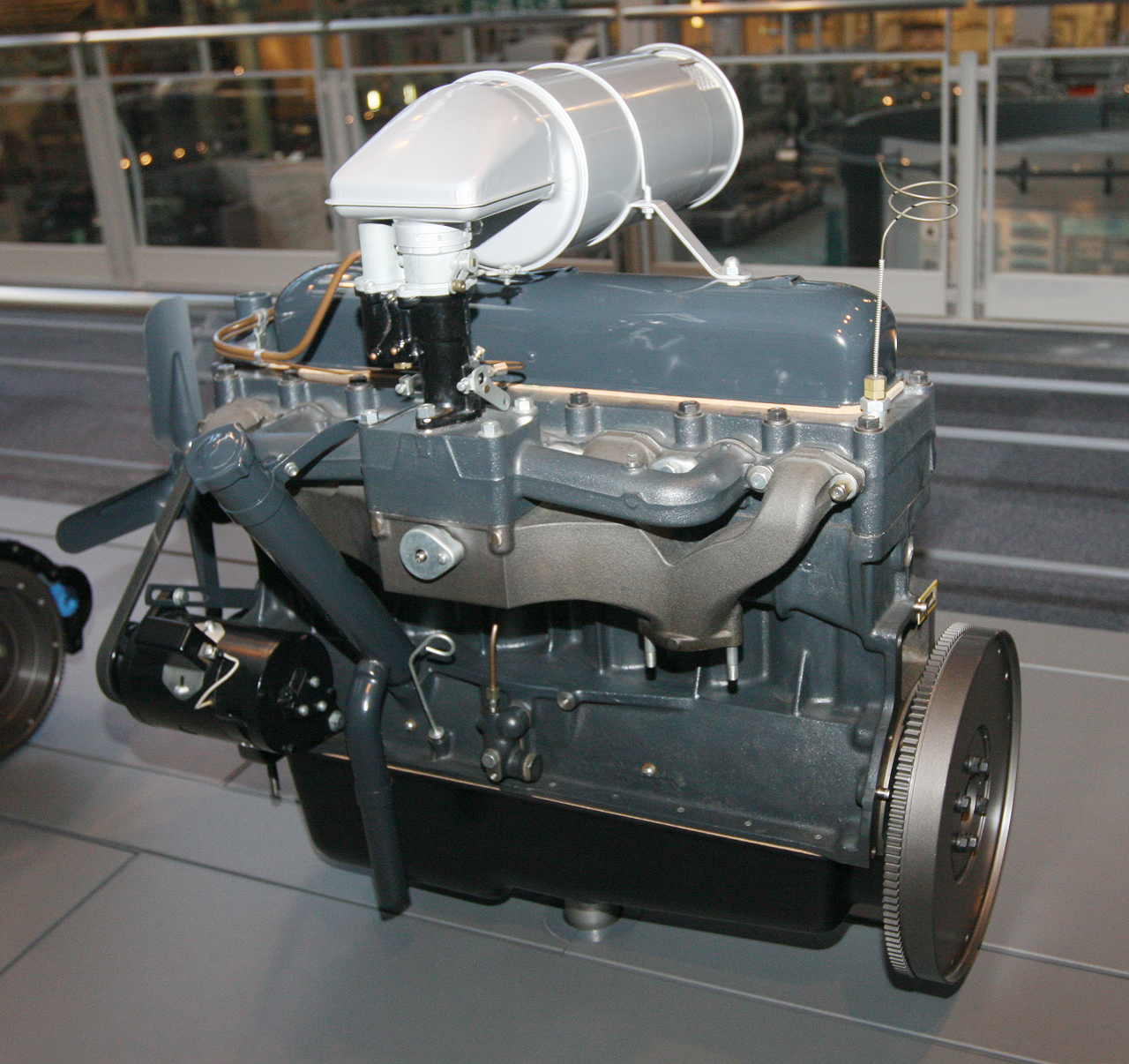

Overview
- Manufacturer: Toyota
- Production: 1935–1947

Layout
- Configuration: I6
- Displacement: 3,389 cc (3.4 L; 206.8 cu in)
- Cylinder bore: 84.1 mm (3.3 in)
- Piston stroke: 101.6 mm (4.0 in)
- Cylinder block material: iron
- Cylinder head material: iron
- Valvetrain: OHV

Combustion
- Fuel system: carburettor
- Fuel type: Gasoline

Output
- Power output: 62 PS (46 kW; 61 hp)

The Type A engine was Toyota's first production engine, being produced from 1935 through 1947.

This engine was a 3,389 cc (3.4 L; 206.8 cu in) pushrod, overhead valve, 6-cylinder, three bearing engine copied from the 1929–36 Chevrolet Gen-1 3 bearing Stovebolt L6 OHV engine. By virtue of a modified intake manifold it produced 62 PS (46 kW), while the Chevrolet engine produced 60 PS (44 kW). GM used a number of local Japanese suppliers for the smaller engine parts (e.g. carburettors) while the Osaka Assembly location was open until appropriated by the Imperial Japanese Government. Toyota was able to use the same suppliers for its cars. The parts were identical enough that pistons, rods, valves, etc. could be used in both the Chevrolet and Toyota engines interchangeably. There are several recorded instances of parts intended for one being used to repair the other.

Toyota had initially considered copying the Ford flathead V8 engine because it was the most popular engine in Japan at the time. However, the machining of two separate banks of cylinders would add too much to the production cost, so the Chevrolet engine was copied instead. The Ford Model T was also being manufactured in Japan beginning in March 1925, followed by the Ford Model A in 1927; both used the flathead Ford Model T engine.

Other references to the Chevy engine claim different power figures. Different manufactures used different measuring techniques (e.g. with or without the generator/alternator connected), engines differed from year to year, and some manufacturers simply lied. In this case, Toyota did back-to-back comparisons using the same techniques, so it is likely that the Toyota engine did in fact produce slightly more power than the Chevy engine on which it was based, which was likely to be a year or two old.

=== Applications ===
- A1 prototype car
- AA sedan
- AB cabriolet
- G1 truck
- GA truck

== Type B ==
Type B

Overview
- Manufacturer: Toyota
- Production: 1938-1956

Layout
- Configuration: I6
- Displacement: 3,386 cc (3.4 L; 206.6 cu in)
- Cylinder bore: 84.1 mm (3.3 in)
- Piston stroke: 101.6 mm (4.0 in)
- Cylinder block material: iron
- Cylinder head material: iron
- Valvetrain: OHV
- Compression ratio: 6.4:1

Combustion
- Fuel system: carburettor
- Fuel type: Gasoline

Output
- Power output: 75-85 HP

Chronology
- Successor: Toyota F engine

The 3,386 cc (3.4 L; 206.6 cu in) Type B was a more technically advanced version of the Type A. Production commenced in November 1938 with the opening of Toyota's Koromo plant. The design was based on the Chevrolet 207 engine, and built under license but with metric dimensions and minor revisions to suit the local market. It had a four-bearing crank and shaft-mounted rocker arms, as did the Chevrolet engine. The type B engine remained in production until 1956 at least.

The original output was 75 PS (55 kW) at 3000 rpm. In January 1940 this was increased to 78 PS (57 kW) at the same engine speed. Another bump, to 82 PS (60 kW) occurred at the time of the BM truck's introduction in March 1947. A 1944 prototype for a large passenger car called "Toyota Large B" also received the B-series engine, although with a higher 6.9:1 compression ratio and producing 85 PS (63 kW). This was also the output of the improved engine fitted to the 4-ton BA and 2.5-ton BC trucks which were built until February and July 1956 respectively.

The Type B was complemented and eventually supplanted by the similar 3.9 L Type F which first appeared in 1951. The Type F is based on the larger OHV GMC Straight-6 engine built from 1939 until 1963 in the same way that the Type A and Type B were based on the Chevrolet engines of their times. There was also an experimental 4-liter version called the Type D.

An unrelated four-cylinder diesel engine introduced in the 1970s was also called the Type B.

=== Applications ===
- Toyota AC sedan
- 1938-1942 Toyota GB truck
- 1940-1941 Toyota HB truck, a shortened GB
- 1942-1944 Toyota KB truck
- 1943-1947 Toyota KC/KCY truck
- 1944-1945 Shinyo (suicide motorboat)
- 1947-1951 Toyota BM truck, also shorter wheelbase BS model from 1949
- 1949- Toyota BL bus
- 1951-1955 BX/BZ truck (82 PS)
- 1951-1955 BJ Jeep (predecessor to the Land Cruiser)
- 1952- Toyota BQ 3/4-ton 4WD truck, reserved for security and police forces
- Toyota BH26 Police Patrol Car (using a modified Toyopet Crown RS body)
- Toyota BH28 Ambulance
- 1954-1956 BA/BC truck (85 PS, improved BX type)

== Type C ==
Type C

Overview
- Manufacturer: Toyota
- Production: 1939-1941

Layout
- Configuration: I4
- Displacement: 2,259 cc (2.3 L; 137.9 cu in)
- Cylinder bore: 84.1 mm (3.3 in)
- Piston stroke: 101.6 mm (4.0 in)
- Cylinder block material: iron
- Cylinder head material: iron
- Valvetrain: OHV
- Compression ratio: 6.4:1

Combustion
- Fuel system: carburettor
- Fuel type: Gasoline

Output
- Power output: 49 PS (36 kW; 48 hp)
- Torque output: 152 N⋅m (112 lb⋅ft) @ 1400 rpm

The 2,259 cc (2.3 L; 137.9 cu in) Type C was produced from 1939 through 1941. It was formed by removing two cylinders from a Type A engine.

=== Applications ===
- AE sedan
- AK 4WD

== Type D ==
Type D

Overview
- Manufacturer: Toyota
- Production: 1944 (prototype)

Layout
- Configuration: I6
- Displacement: 4,052 cc (4.1 L; 247.3 cu in)
- Cylinder bore: 92.0 mm (3.6 in)
- Piston stroke: 101.6 mm (4.0 in)
- Cylinder block material: iron
- Cylinder head material: iron
- Valvetrain: OHV

Combustion
- Fuel system: carburettor
- Fuel type: Gasoline

Chronology
- Successor: Toyota F engine

The 4,052 cc (4.1 L; 247.3 cu in) Type D was a larger version of the B engine developed in early 1944, featuring an increased bore while retaining the same stroke. It was a direct response to a national order issued in 1940, instructing Toyota to develop a higher output engine based on the B. It did not enter series production, with Toyota instead developing the somewhat smaller Type F engine after the war. Output was 100 PS (74 kW).

== Type E ==
Type E

Overview
- Manufacturer: Toyota
- Production: 1938

Layout
- Configuration: I2 two-stroke
- Displacement: 585 cc (0.6 L; 35.7 cu in)

Combustion
- Fuel system: carburettor
- Fuel type: Gasoline

The 585 cc (0.6 L; 35.7 cu in) Type E was produced in 1938 only for the prototype EA sedan. It was a copy of the two-stroke engine used in the DKW F7.

=== Applications ===
- EA FWD sedan (a copy of the DKW F7)
- EB RWD sedan

== Type S ==
Type S
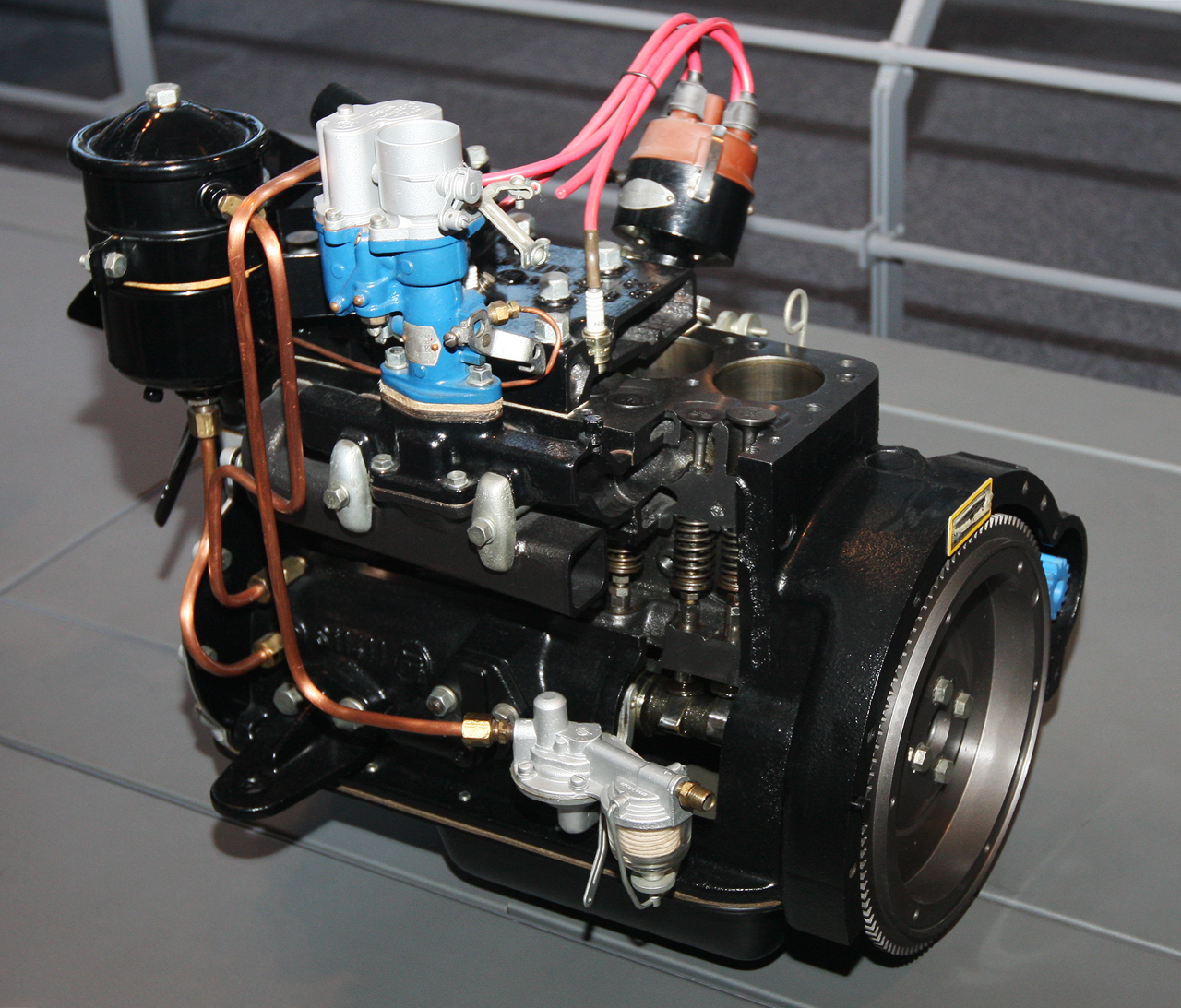

Overview
- Manufacturer: Toyota
- Production: 1947-1959

Layout
- Configuration: I4
- Displacement: 995 cc (1.0 L; 60.7 cu in)
- Cylinder bore: 65 mm (2.6 in)
- Piston stroke: 75 mm (3.0 in)
- Cylinder block material: iron
- Cylinder head material: iron
- Valvetrain: side valve
- Compression ratio: 6.5:1

Combustion
- Fuel system: carburettor
- Fuel type: Gasoline

Output
- Power output: 27 PS (20 kW; 27 hp)
- Torque output: 98 N⋅m (72 lb⋅ft) @ 2400 rpm

Chronology
- Predecessor: None
- Successor: Toyota P engine

The 995 cc (1.0 L; 60.7 cu in) Type S was produced from 1947 through 1959. It was unrelated to previous Toyota overhead valve engines, being designed by reverse-engineering a 1930s Adler Trumpf Junior's engine, and used the less sophisticated flathead engine design which was short lived.

=== Applications ===
- SA sedan
- SB light truck
- SC sedan
- SD sedan
- SF sedan
- SG light truck
- Toyopet SH Custom sedan
- Toyopet Light Truck SKB/SK20 Toyoace
- ST10 Corona, ST16 Corona Van

== See also ==
- List of Toyota engines
- Toyota AA passenger car
- Toyota G1 truck
