= Toyota BX =

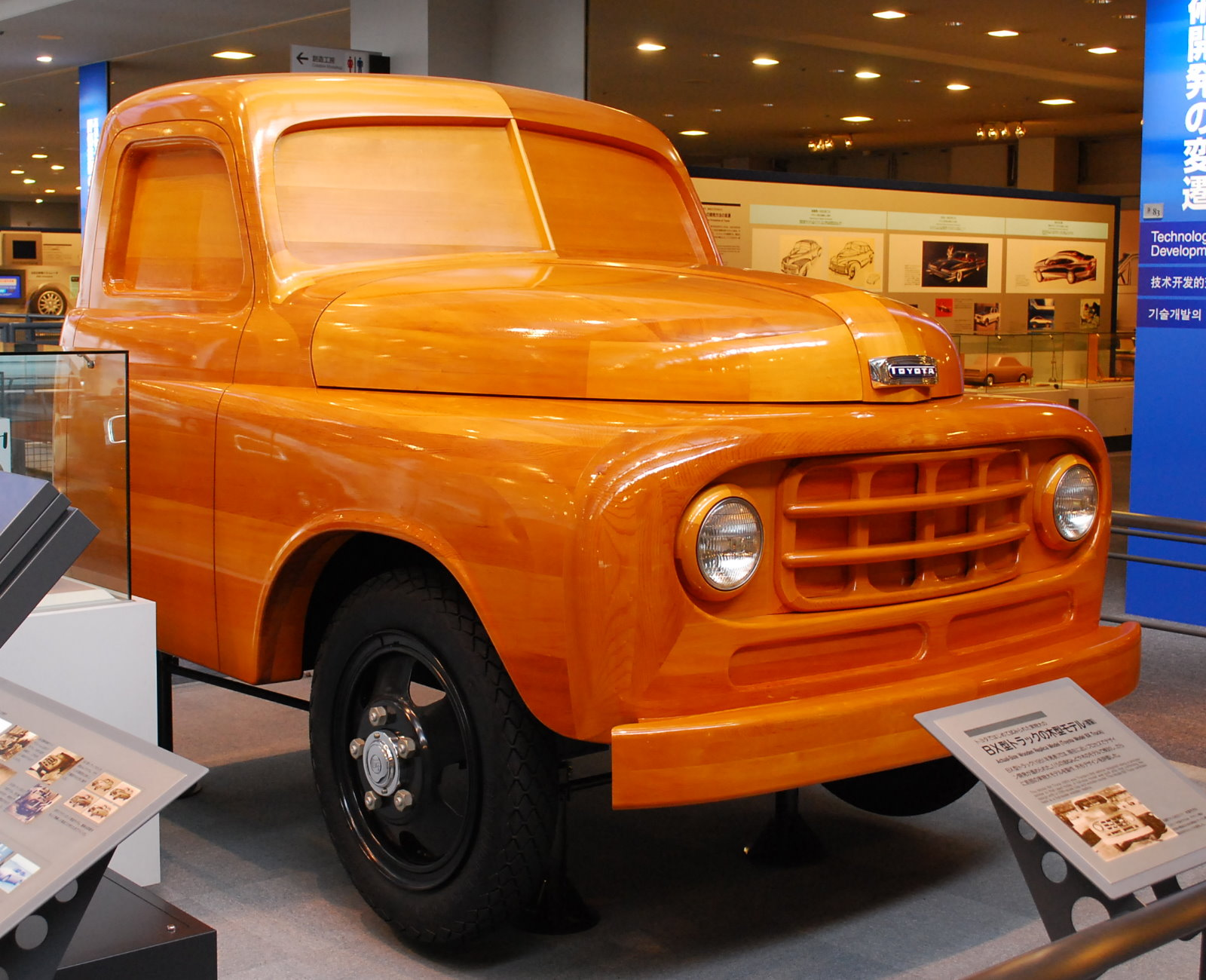
Wooden BX replica in the Toyota Automobile Museum

The Toyota BX is a 4,000 kg truck built by Toyota from 1951. It is 6.6 metres (22 ft) long, and has a close resemblance to Ford's 1948 trucks. The engines owed much to Chevrolet's inline-sixes of the period. The BX replaced the BM truck, which was introduced in 1947. Compared to the BM, the BX was considerably easier to build and the cabin could seat three rather than two.

== History ==
The BX prototype entered production in June 1951 after the prototype had undergone extensive testing in 1950. The truck had been meant for introduction in August 1950, but a two-month strike beginning in April 1950 combined with Toyota's production commitments for the Korean War efforts meant a sizable delay. The BX was built at the Toyota Honsha plant.

=== Mechanicals ===
The BX originally used the 3,386 cc Type B 6-cylinder engine that was first introduced in the 1938 Toyota GB truck. It produced 82 PS (60 kW) at 3,000 rpm. Top speed was 72 km/h (45 mph). In September 1951, this was joined by the bigger 3.9 litre F-engined FX, which offered 95 PS (70 kW) at the same engine speed. At the same time, the 2.5-ton BZ and FZ models on a shorter wheelbase were also added. In June 1953, output of the Type B engine increased to 85 PS (63 kW).

The BX/FX did see some exports, mainly to countries without their own car industries. A left-hand-drive model had been planned from the beginning, and the range was marketed in Taiwan, Thailand, Argentina, Brazil, and Uruguay.

The BX and FX were re-designed in February 1954, becoming the BA and FA models. On the outside, changes were largely limited to a new grille, but the Type F engine was also upgraded and now produced 105 PS (77 kW). Through a series of upgrades these trucks were kept in production until 1964, although the BA was discontinued in 1956. The FA (and diesel-engined DA) names were kept on a new generation of trucks that were kept in production in Japan until 1978 and elsewhere in the world into the 2000s.

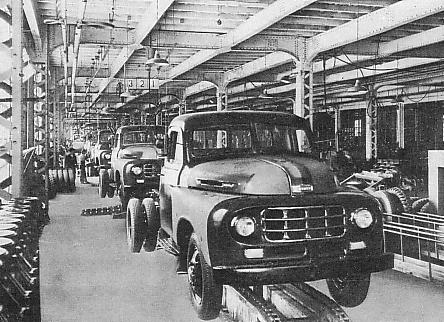
BXs on the production line in the 1950s
