= Toyota F engine =

The Toyota F series engine was a series of OHV inline-6-cylinder engines produced by Toyota between November 1949 and 1992. They are known for their high amount of torque at low engine speeds, massive cast-iron blocks and heads and also their high reliability. The F engine had one of the longest production runs of any Toyota engine. The F engines all incorporate overhead valves actuated by pushrods from a gear driven camshaft in the lower portion of the engine.

== History ==
The engine was developed beginning in December 1948 and was largely a bored out version of the earlier Type B engine. However, Toyota incorporated lessons learned during the war, and the F engine benefitted from lightweight alloy pistons and better lubrication than earlier models. The engine's first installation was in a 1949 version of the Toyota BM truck (called FM with this engine fitted), originally only in units bound for the Brazilian market. The FM became available in the Japanese market as well beginning in 1950. The F engine gained fame as the Land Cruiser engine, it was used in a variety of other large truck applications as well, such as in fire trucks and the Toyota FQ15 trucks. It was also used in the FH26 police patrol car (based on the RH Super), FS20-FS50 police patrol cars (based on the RS20-MS50 Crown), the FHJ and FH24 fire trucks (both based on the RH Super) and the FS35 (based on the RS30 Crown) and FS45V ambulance (based on the MS40 Crown).

=== F ===
F
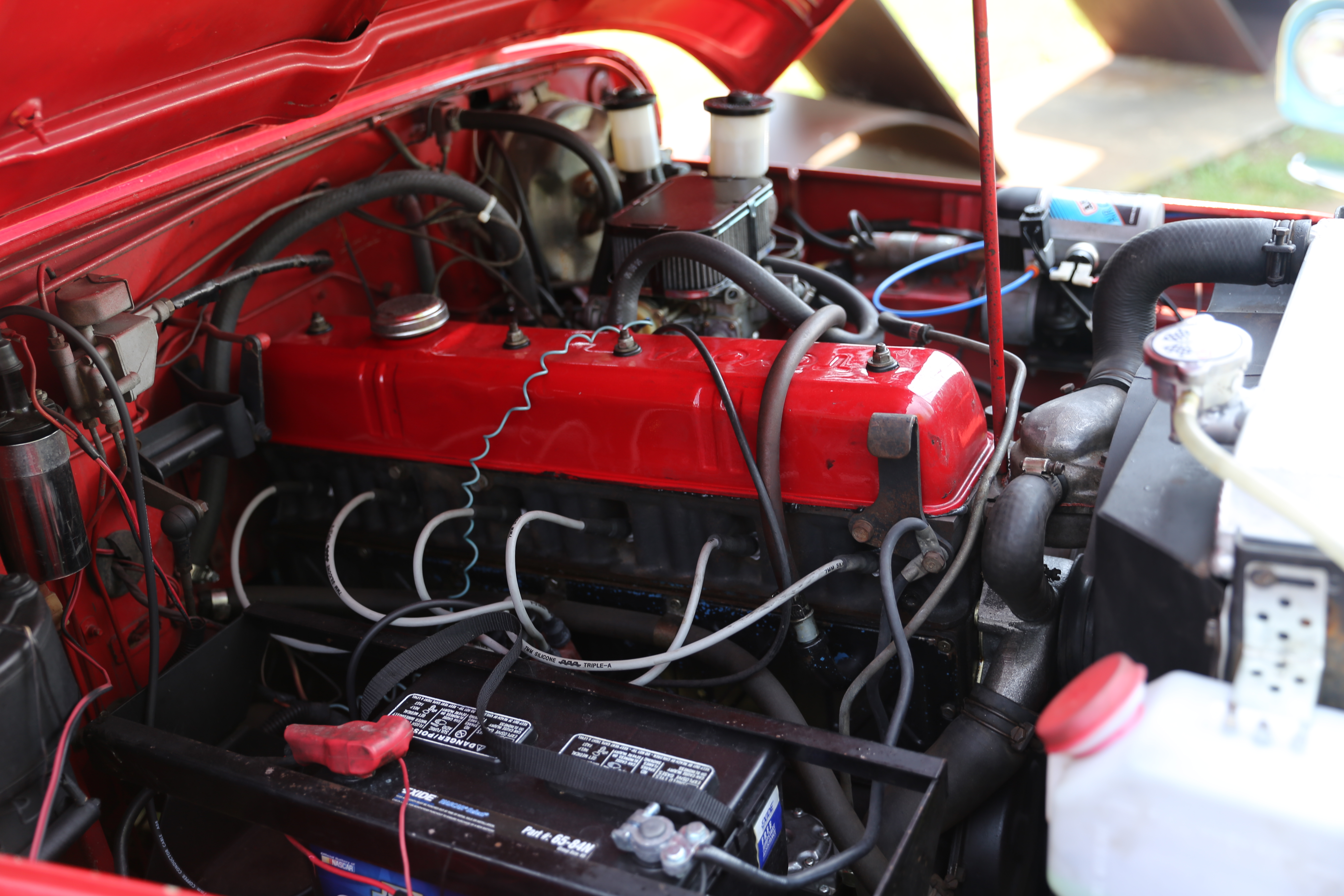
- Toyota F engine in a FJ40 Land Cruiser

Overview
- Manufacturer: Toyota
- Production: 1949–1975

Layout
- Configuration: Inline-6
- Displacement: 3.9 L (3878 cc)
- Cylinder bore: 90 mm (3.5 in)
- Piston stroke: 101.6 mm (4.0 in)
- Compression ratio: 6.4:1 (until 1954); 6.8:1

Combustion
- Fuel system: Carbureted
- Fuel type: Gasoline

Output
- Power output: 70/75/93 kW (95/105/125 hp)
- Torque output: 261/289 N·m (189/209 ft·lb)

Chronology
- Predecessor: B
- Successor: 2F

The F engine is a 3.9-liter, 75/93 kW (105/125 hp), carbureted gasoline engine that is capable of 261/289 N·m (189/209 lb·ft) of torque at 2000 rpm; the difference in power and torque is different depending on the export destination. The original design was started in 1948 when Toyota begun to explore exporting their vehicles internationally.

The F engine block, crankshaft and lower end assembly is loosely based on the 1939-63 G.M.C. L6 OHV 236 engine but with a taller deck (rather than the similar but smaller Chevrolet 1937-63 Gen-2 L6 OHV engine), and built under license. The cylinder head and combustion chamber is derived from the Chevrolet L6 OHV "Stovebolt" engine, slightly scaled up. The general idea was consumers would feel comfortable with the engine since it was a familiar design and had a proven track record. None of the bottom end of the engine is interchangeable with these engines.

The F engine replaced the early 3.4-liter type B gasoline engine introduced in 1938 (not to be confused with the 2.9-liter B diesel engine introduced much later). The early B engine was based on the original 1929-36 Chevrolet Gen-1 207 inline-6, not the later 1937-1963 Gen-2 216, 235 etc. engine.

First introduced in export models of the 4-ton BM (FM) truck in November 1949 with 6.4:1 compression and 95 PS (70 kW), it then found its way into the Toyota FX/FZ in September 1951. Beginning in 1954 it became installed in the long running FA/FC series of trucks; this was also when the combustion chambers were reworked and the compression ratio was increased, upping output to 105 PS (77 kW). The FB type bus also used this engine, as did the Toyota Massy Dyna FC10. From 1964 until 1975 the FA100 truck (and derivatives) used a 130 PS (96 kW) F engine, although by this time, diesel-engined trucks found more favor in the market. A variety of fire trucks and special bodied patrol cars also used the F engine.

The F engine had numerous slight variations over its lifetime. These were changes Toyota made to the engine to improve its power such as the shape of the cylinder head, type of pistons or the shape of the intake manifold. To designate the different iterations, Toyota added a three digit suffix to the engine code ranging from 105-155 (ex: F135).

- F105 - The first iteration of the Toyota F engine.
- F135 - Siamesed Intake ports.
- F145 - Low compression.
- F155 - Domed pistons, high output.

In September 1973 the F engine was updated, to a model sometimes referred to as "F and a half" or F.5. This remains a 3.9-liter, 75/93 kW (105/125 hp), carbureted gasoline engine capable of 261/289 N·m (189/209 lb·ft) of torque at 2000 rpm; the major difference between the F and the F.5 is the oiling system. The F.5 uses the same oiling set-up and configuration as its 2F successor.

=== 2F ===
2F

Overview
- Manufacturer: Toyota
- Production: 1975–1988

Layout
- Configuration: Inline-6
- Displacement: 4.2 L (4230 cc)
- Cylinder bore: 94 mm (3.7 in)
- Piston stroke: 101.6 mm (4.0 in)
- Compression ratio: 7.8:1

Combustion
- Fuel system: Carbureted
- Fuel type: Gasoline

Output
- Power output: 101 kW (135 hp)
- Torque output: 271 N·m (200 ft·lb)

Chronology
- Predecessor: F
- Successor: 3F/3F-E

The second version of the engine, called the 2F, was introduced in 1975. There are a few differences between the F and 2F, i.e., a larger bore in the 2F, removing one oil ring and forcing the oil to travel through the oil filter before the engine.

=== 3F/3F-E ===
3F/3F-E

Overview
- Manufacturer: Toyota
- Production: 1985–1992

Layout
- Configuration: Inline-6
- Displacement: 4.0 L (3955 cc)
- Cylinder bore: 94 mm (3.7 in)
- Piston stroke: 95 mm (3.7 in)
- Compression ratio: 8.1:1

Combustion
- Fuel system: Fuel Injected
- Fuel type: Gasoline

Output
- Power output: 116 kW (155 hp)
- Torque output: 303 N·m (220 ft·lb)

Chronology
- Predecessor: 2F
- Successor: 1FZ-FE

The 3F was introduced in 1985, but did not become available in the United States until 1988. Differences from the 2F engine include a modified cylinder head to reduce warping and separation from inlet and exhaust manifolds, the introduction of electronic fuel injection (EFI) in some markets, a vastly improved emissions system, and a smaller displacement resulting from a shorter piston stroke. The displacement decreased from 4.2 liters to 4 liters, but the engine power increased by 15 kW (20 hp) and torque increased by 14 N⋅m (10 lb⋅ft). As a result of these changes to the engine design the redline was increased, allowing a wider powerband which made this engine far more suitable for on-road travel.

In 1992, the F series engines, after almost 45 years, finally ceased production. In 1993, the F series was replaced by the dual overhead cam (DOHC) 1FZ series.

Due to the low rpm design and cast iron construction of these engines, it is not uncommon to see them reach over 480,000 km (300,000 miles) before needing a major overhaul.
