= Toyota Massy Dyna =

Japanese truck

The Toyota Massy Dyna (トヨタ・マッシーダイナ) is a four-tonne medium-duty truck built by Toyota between 1969 and 1979. It could seat three.

The chassis was developed by Toyota, with the Toyota Auto Body subsidiary designing the bodywork. Hino Motors did the work on engine, transmission, and clutch. The Massy Dyna (QC10) was introduced in September 1969. While the Massy Dyna's name related to the smaller Toyota Dyna truck, also of a cab-over engine design, its mechanics were closer to those of the five-ton DA/FA100 trucks. The doors were actually shared with the larger DA115-series cabover models. Originally it was equipped with an inline-six 4507-cc DQ100 Hino diesel engine, with 105 PS (77 kW). The 130 PS (96 kW) petrol F-series engine (3878 cc) was also in the lineup, a model which carries the FC10 chassis code. The petrol version was mostly used as a fire truck, as its high fuel consumption made it uninteresting for commercial users.

The truck was also available in a somewhat lighter 3.5 ton model, as well as with a longer wheelbase of 3,845 mm (151.4 in). The long model received the QC15 chassis code. The regular version has a wheelbase of 3,445 mm (135.6 in), and an overall length of 6,350 mm (250 in). There was also a short wheelbase model, most commonly built as a dump truck, on a 3,045 mm (119.9 in) wheelbase and with the QC12 chassis code. By 1972 the DQ100 engine had been upgraded and produced 110 PS (81 kW) at 3200 rpm.

In March 1975 the Massy Dyna was updated, and its name changed to "Toyota Massy Dyna Cargo". Capacity was increased to 4.5 tons, while the new EH100 diesel engine (still from Hino) was of 5871 cc and offered 145 PS (107 kW). The truck also received a very light facelift: the grille was now painted white rather than black and the headlight surrounds were slightly altered. The wheelbase increased to 4,000 mm (157.5 in), combined with the new engine this meant a new chassis code: EC20. The EC20 also has triple wipers. There was also the petrol-engined FC20, which appeared a month after the diesel EC20. This has the 4.2 litre 2F engine with 140 PS (103 kW) at 3600 rpm. The short wheelbase version (originally FC12/QC12) was now called the EC22/FC22. In March 1976 the Massy Dyna received another slight change, when the fenders on the cab were widened. An extra long wheelbase model was added at the same time. By the time of the 1979 Tokyo Motor Show the Massy Dyna, never a strong seller, had been discontinued in favour of Toyota subsidiary Hino's Ranger.
