= Toyota FA =

The Toyota FA and BA were heavy duty trucks introduced in February 1954. They were facelifted versions of the earlier BX/FX trucks, retaining those trucks Type B and Type F six-cylinder petrol engines. The first letter in the model name indicates the engine family fitted; in 1957 the Type D diesel engine was introduced in a model known as the DA. The second letter indicated the size of the truck, with shorter medium duty versions being coded BC/FC/DC. A second letter "B" was used on bus versions of this chassis. A second generation FA/DA was introduced in 1964 and was built in Japan until 1980, when Hino replaced Toyota's heavier truck lines entirely. The DA, however, was also built in numerous other countries and manufacture continued into the first decade of the 21st century.

== First generation (1954) ==
Toyota BA/FA/DA (first generation)
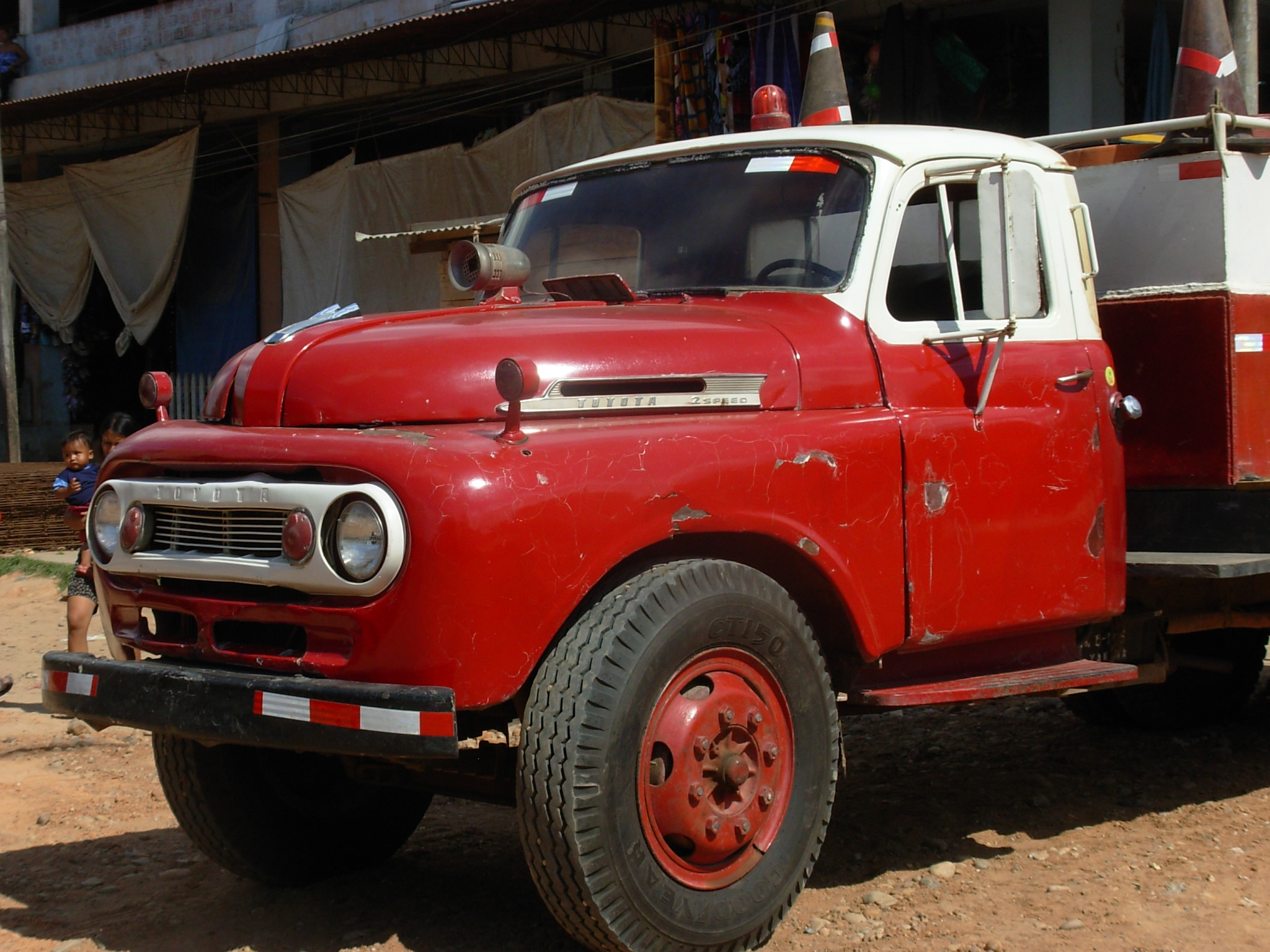

Overview
- Type: Truck
- Manufacturer: Toyota
- Also called: Toyota BC/FC/DC
- Production: 1954–1964
- Assembly: Toyota Koromo plant

Body and chassis
- Class: Class 3 truck
- Body style: 2-door truck
- Related: Toyota BB/DB/FB buses

Powertrain
- Engine: 3.4 L B petrol I6 (BA/BC); 3.9 L F petrol I6 (FA/FC); 5.9 L D diesel I6 (DA/DC); 6.5 L 2D diesel I6 (DA)

Chronology
- Predecessor: Toyota BX/FX
- Successor: Toyota DA100/FA100; Toyota Massy Dyna (for cab-over models)

Introduced in February 1954, the original models were 4-or-4.5-tonne (8,800 or 9,900 lb) trucks (BA and FA respectively) on a 4,150 mm (163 in) wheelbase. Visible changes vis-a-vis the earlier BX and FX trucks were mainly limited to a new grille, but the 3878 cc (236.7 cu in) F engine in the FA was upgraded, gaining ten horsepower for a total output of 105 PS (77 kW) at 3000 rpm. The BA's 3386 cc (206.6 cu in) Type B engine still produced 85 PS (63 kW) at 3000 rpm. In March the 2.5-tonne (5,500 lb) BC model was added, followed by the F-engined FC in June. The BC and FC have a 3,000 mm (120 in) wheelbase and were often used as tractor units.

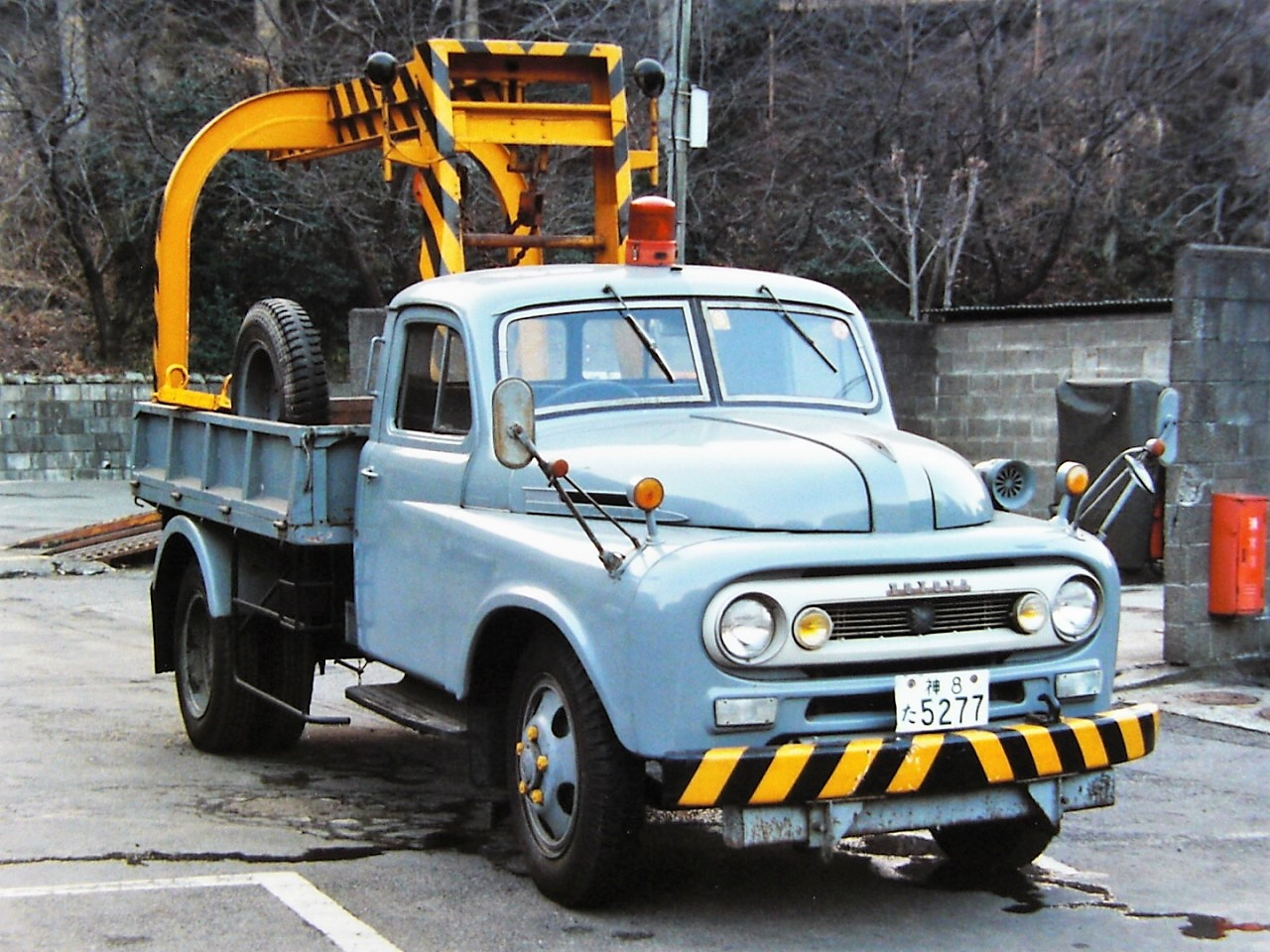
Toyota FA80 (1959-1961)

The heavier FA sold very well in a changing Japanese trucking market which was moving to larger loads and greater distances. Accordingly, in September 1954 Toyota lengthened the FA's chassis and upgraded it to carry 5 tonnes, renaming it the FA5. The smaller BA and BC were discontinued in February and July 1956. Also in February 1956, the FA5 was facelifted with a wider grille and equipped with a transmission with synchromesh on second through fourth gear (a first for the segment in Japan) and renamed the FA60. The new name did not reflect a change in payload, which remained at 5 tonnes (11,000 lb). Simultaneously, the lighter FC received similar changes, becoming the FC60 in the process. The FC60 became the FC70 in January 1958, reflecting an increased compression ratio and a power increase to 110 PS (81 kW) for the F engine. Along with a payload upgrade to 3 tonnes (6,600 lb) it was renamed the FC80 in November 1959. This was kept in production until September 1964, when it was replaced by the second generation FC100. The FA60 became the FA70 in January 1958, with the same engine upgrade as for the FC70. The heavier part of the F-engined range was split into two in September 1959, with the FA80 and FA90 being built to handle 5 or 6 tonnes (11,000 or 13,000 lb) respectively; these model codes were again maintained until the first generation was replaced.

In March 1957 the diesel-engined DA60 was introduced. The all new "D" engine was a pre-combustion diesel straight-six displacing 5890 cc (359 cu in) and producing 110 PS (81 kW) at 2600 rpm. The DA60 also prompted Toyota to introduce the new Toyota Diesel Store sales network, which remained until 1988 and was the exclusive distributor of Toyota's diesel-engined vehicles in Japan. This became the DA70 at the beginning of 1958. As with the petrol-engined models, the diesel lineup was split into the 5-tonne DA80 and the 6-tonne DA90 in September 1959. Unlike the petrol-engined models, however, the 6-tonne diesels also received a new, larger and more powerful engine. The 2D displaces 6,494 cc (396 cu in) and produces 130 PS (96 kW). There were also the long-wheelbase DA95/FA95, with 4,400 mm (170 in) between the axles. Some diesel-engined models carry an "H" suffix (such as a DA90-H); this signifies a model with a two-speed rear axle, giving a total of eight forward speeds.

=== Appearance ===
In late 1959 the lineup was refreshed and the grille was changed to incorporate two yellow marker lights. In late 1961 (for the 1962 model year) the range was facelifted again, with a single-piece curved windshield replacing the earlier split unit. This was Japan's first heavy truck with such a fitment. At the same time, the grille was stamped directly with widely spaced "TOYOTA" lettering rather than having chromed letters mounted to a red bar as earlier.

=== Cabover trucks ===
With the sales of bonneted trucks slowing down in Japan at this time, reflecting ever more congested city streets, Toyota developed a 4-tonne (8,800 lb) cab-over version on a 3,400 mm (130 in) wheelbase. Based on the medium-duty FC80 model, the new DC80C was presented in October 1963, fitted with the D-type diesel engine and a tilting cab. As with the bonneted models, the 5.9-liter D-type six-cylinder engine develops 110 PS (81 kW). Because the engine was mounted between the seats, the cabover model could only take two occupants. The DC80C initially sold very well, but problems with the drivetrain as well as the chassis meant that it soon lost out to its competitors. At the same time as the DC80C, the petrol-engined FC100C with 130 PS (96 kW) was also introduced. The cabovers received a facelift in September 1966. The 4-ton cabover trucks were both replaced by the new Toyota Massy Dyna in September 1969.

== Second generation (1964) ==
Toyota FA/FC/DA (second generation)
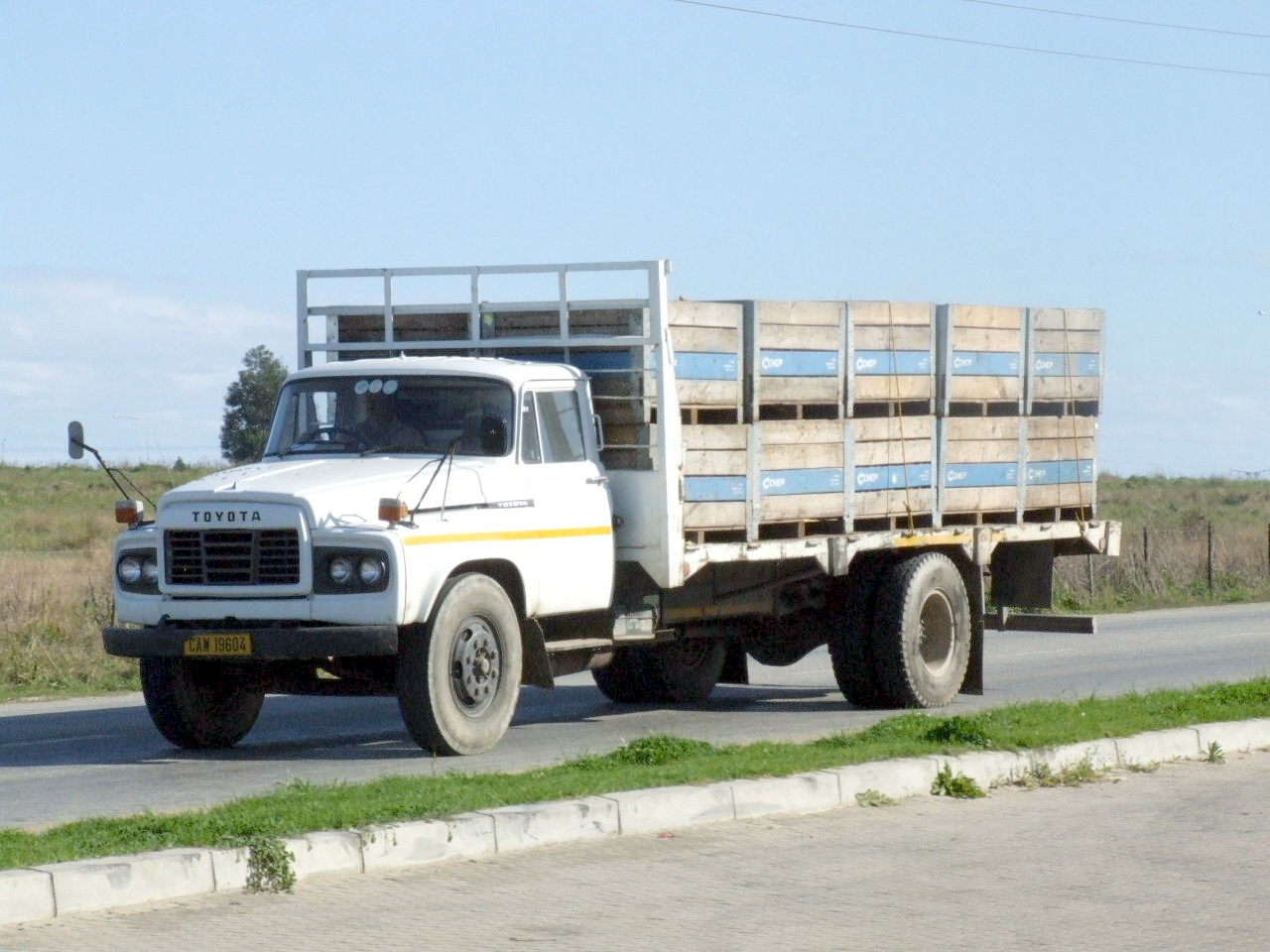
- Late South African Toyota DA116

Overview
- Type: Truck
- Manufacturer: Toyota
- Also called: Toyota 6000 (Australia)
- Production: 1964–1978; 1970–1986 (Indonesia); Until 2001 in South Africa
- Assembly: Toyota Koromo plant; Indonesia; Kenya; South Africa; Thailand

Body and chassis
- Class: Class 3 truck
- Body style: 2-door truck
- Related: Toyota DB/DR buses

Powertrain
- Engine: 3.9 L F petrol I6 (FA/FC); 4.2 L 2F petrol I6 (FA); 5.9 L D diesel I6 (DA); 6.5 L 2D diesel I6 (DA)

Dimensions
- Wheelbase: 3,400 mm (133.9 in) (FC-series); 4,100 mm (161.4 in) (100/110-series); 4,300 mm (169.3 in) (115-series); 4,500 mm (177.2 in) (116-series)

Chronology
- Predecessor: Toyota BA/DA/FA (first generation)
- Successor: Hino 600

Appearing in September 1964, the second generation adopted a new squared-off cab with twin headlights. Wheelbases were adjusted upwards, to 4,100 and 4,300 mm (161 and 169 in). The longest wheelbase was installed in the 115-series, the shorter ones were 100- and 110-series. The chassis remained mostly the same as the previous model but was modified for increased rigidity and the suspension was strengthened. The glass area of the cabin was increased and a dished steering wheel was adopted for safety. These moves were intended to make the truck a more capable proposition on Japan's newly developed highways.

At the time of introduction, there were six main models available: The 100-series is a 5-tonne (11,000 lb) truck, fitted with either the F or the D engine. The 110- and 115-series are rated for 6 tonnes (13,000 lb), and received the F or the larger 2D diesel engine. A month after the heavy-duty models, the 3.5-tonne (7,700 lb) FC100 was introduced. Power output for the F as well as the 2D engines were 130 PS (96 kW) at the time of introduction. The diesel unit, however, offered considerably higher torque, at 40 kg⋅m (392 N⋅m; 289 lb⋅ft) versus 30 kg⋅m (294 N⋅m; 217 lb⋅ft). The 5.9-liter D engine produces 110 PS (81 kW) and 35 kg⋅m (343 N⋅m; 253 lb⋅ft) of torque at 1200 rpm. In June 1965, the extra long-wheelbase, 6-tonne DA116 was introduced.

The FC100 was taken out of production in March 1974. Around this time, the series was also facelifted. The new models have a grille with four central openings flanked by six openings on either side, rather than the earlier seven-bar grille. The engine badges were removed from the front fenders, and the identification script between the door and the bonnet now read simply "TOYOTA" rather than TOYOTA 5000 or 6000 depending on the weight rating. In January 1975, petrol-engined FAs changed over to the 4.2-liter 2F engine. In April 1977 the 2D engine was thoroughly overhauled, to further increase reliability over the earlier, somewhat troublesome Toyota diesels.

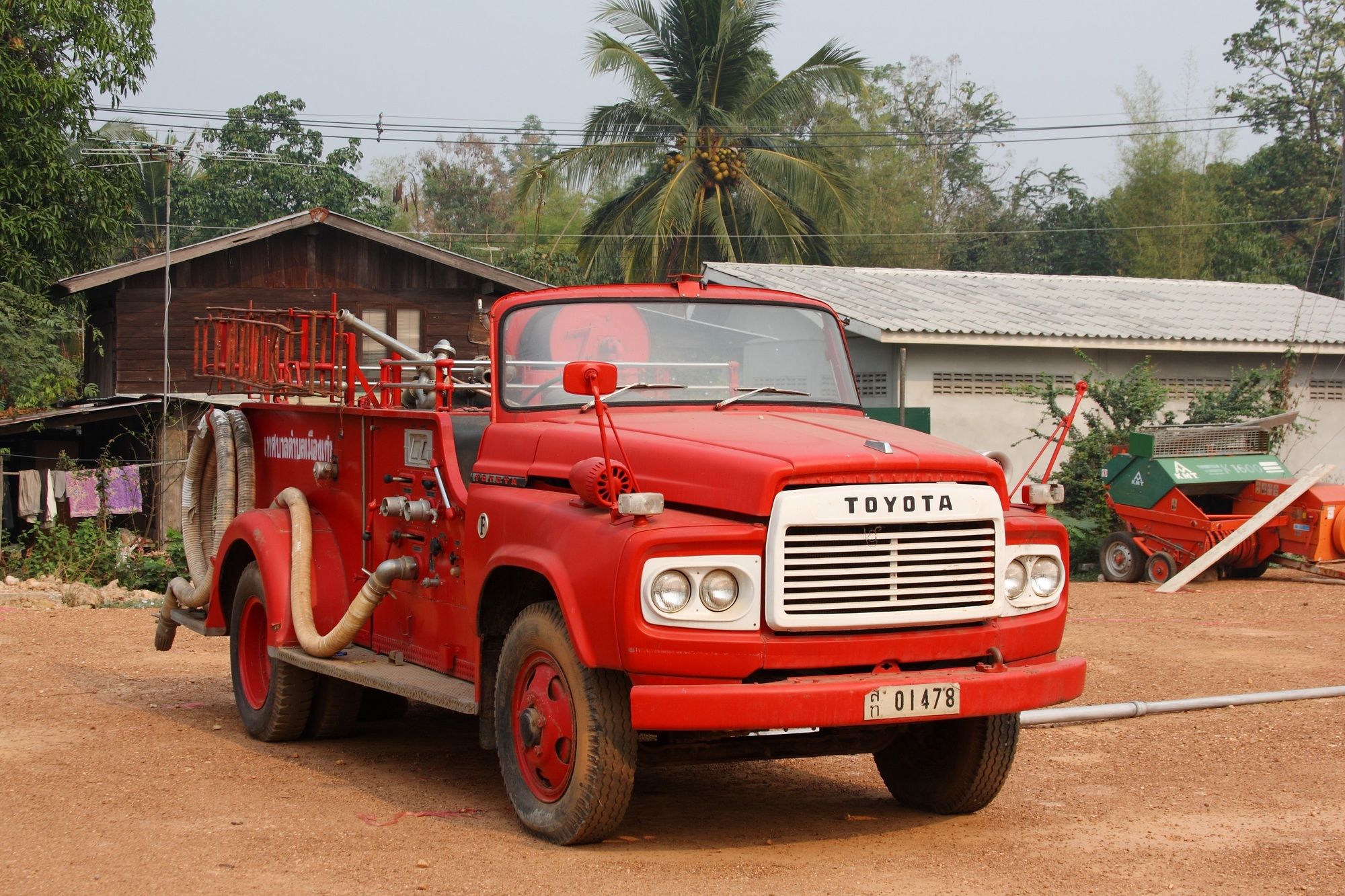
Petrol-engined Toyota FA100 fire engine in Thailand. In many markets, petrol engines were reserved for such applications where quick starting and strong performance were essential.

Japanese production of the second generation DA/FA ended in 1978 in favor of subsidiary brand Hino Motors, and likely because bonneted trucks in this segment were falling out of favor in Japan during these years. The DA/FA was also assembled in several other countries, however, including but not limited to Indonesia, Thailand, Kenya, and South Africa. In Indonesia it was nicknamed "Toyota Buaya" (Alligator Toyota or Crocodile Toyota), a reference to the alligator-style bonnet. Indonesian sales officially began in January 1970 under the auspices of Astra International until the formation of the Toyota Astra Motor (TAM) joint venture in 1971. TAM built a dedicated plant for the FA/DA in 1973 and exported SKD kits to various countries, including Nigeria and Australia. Indonesian models were facelifted in 1976 and post-facelift models were painted moss green as standard; they continued in local production until 1986.

Kenyan assembly began in 1977, while South African-made trucks began using locally made engines in May 1982. Production in South Africa continued until 2001, over twenty years after Japanese manufacture had ended.

Under Toyota's partnership with Hino, the next bonneted truck of both companies would not come out until 2004 - when the Hino 600 started being produced.

=== Cabover trucks ===
There was also a cabover 6-tonne (13,000 lb) version, called the FA115C or DA115C depending on engine fitment. They sit on a 4,300 mm (169 in) wheelbase and were introduced in September 1964; the DA115C received the enlarged 2D diesel engine with 130 PS (96 kW). After an engine revision in April 1977, this engine produced 160 PS (118 kW) at 2800 rpm and torque increased to 45 kg⋅m (441 N⋅m; 325 lb⋅ft) at 1400 rpm. The DA115C was kept in production until February 1980. It thus outlived the bonneted FA/DA-series which it preceded. The 6-tonne cabovers have a longer cab to accommodate a small sleeping area behind the front seats. There are also period brochures from 1963/1964 showing a 5.5-tonne (12,000 lb) model called the DA95C, using the 2D engine and a version of the DA115C cab with unusual additional small windows flanking the grille.
