= Toyota Coaster =

Single-decker minibus produced by Toyota

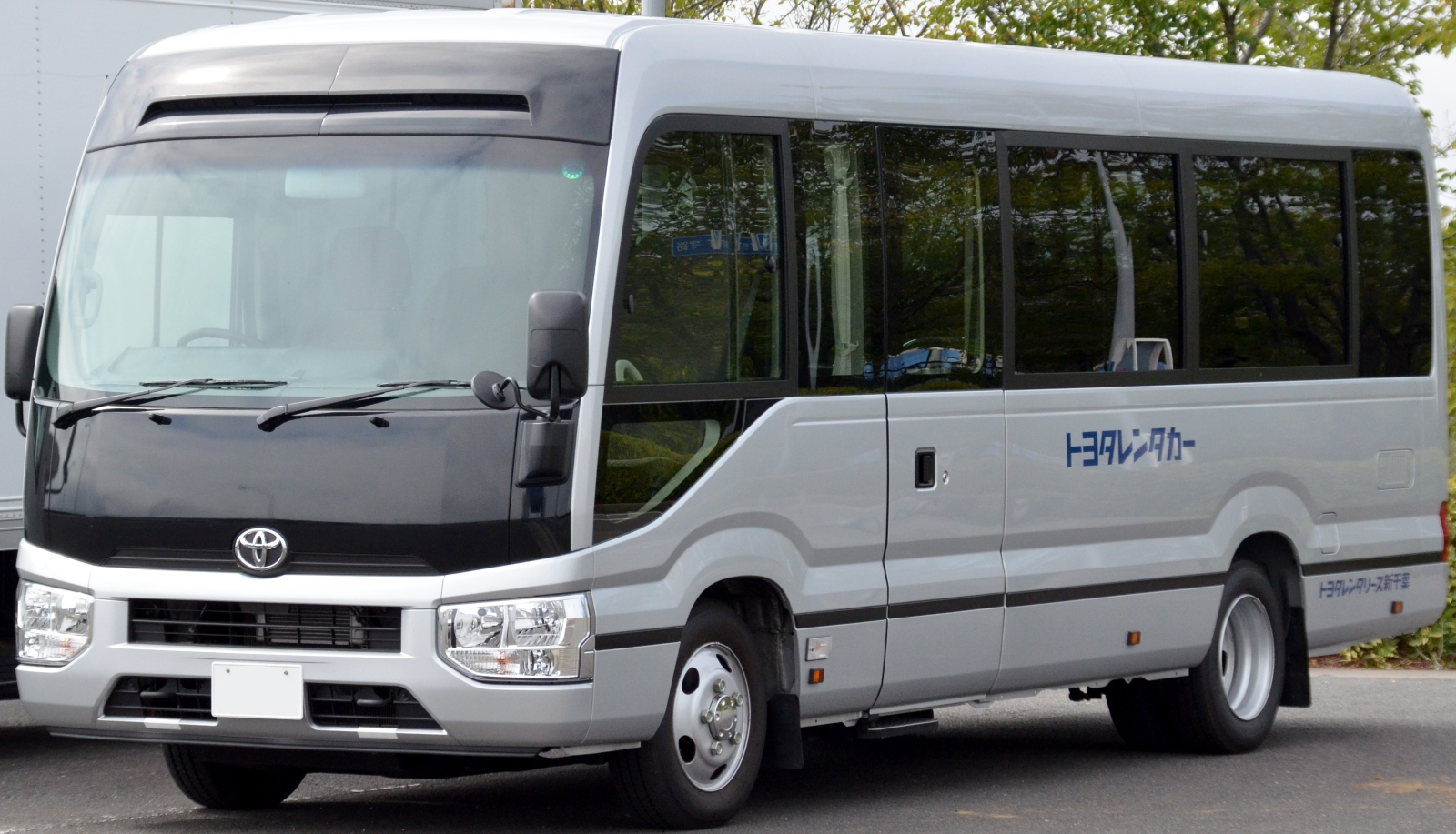
- Toyota Coaster GX (XZB70)

Overview
- Manufacturer: Toyota
- Also called: Hino Liesse II; Wanli Toyota Coaster (China, JV)
- Production: 1969–present
- Assembly: Japan: Toyota, Aichi (Toyota Auto Body); Japan: Kakamigahara, Gifu (Gifu Auto Body); China: Sichuan (Sichuan FAW Toyota) (CKD)

Body and chassis
- Class: Minibus
- Body style: Single-decker minibus
- Layout: Front-engine, rear-wheel-drive / four-wheel drive
- Floor type: Step entrance
- Chassis: SWB/LWB/SLWB

Powertrain
- Engine: Petrol: 1.5 L 5E I4 (Hybrid); 2.0 L 5R I4; 2.2 L 20R I4; 2.4 L 22R I4; 2.7 L 3RZ I4; 2.7 L 2TR-FE I4; 4.0 L 3F I6; 4.0 L 6GR-FE V6; Diesel: 2.5 L 2J I4; 2.8 L 1GD-FTV I4; 3.0 L B I4; 3.0 L 3GD-FTV I4; 3.2 L 2B I4; 3.4 L 3B I4; 3.4 L 13B I4; 3.7 L 14B I4; 4.0 L Hino N04C series turbo-diesel I4; 4.0 L 2H I6; 4.0 L 12H-T turbo-diesel I6; 4.1 L 15B/15B-FT/15B-FTE turbo-diesel I4; 4.2 L 1HD turbo-diesel I6; 4.2 L 1HZ I6; LPG: 4.1 L 1BZ-FPE I4
- Capacity: 8–30
- Transmission: 6 speed Aisin AH15/16 manual; 5 speed Aisin M155/M551 manual; 6 speed A860E/A861E/AK60E automatic; 4 speed A441E/A442E/A443E/A444E automatic

Dimensions
- Length: 6,200–7,725 mm (244.1–304.1 in)
- Width: 2,000 mm (78.7 in)
- Height: 2,600 mm (102.4 in)
- Curb weight: 2,575–3,745 kg (5,677–8,256 lb)

The Toyota Coaster (Japanese: トヨタ・コースター, Hepburn: Toyota Kōsutā) is a single-decker minibus produced by Toyota. It was introduced in 1969, with the second generation introduced in 1982, followed by the third generation in 1992 and the fourth generation in late 2016. In Japan, the Coaster is sold exclusively at Toyota Store dealerships. Since 1996, the Toyota Coaster has been badge engineered as the Hino Liesse II.

In Japan, the Coaster was formerly produced by Toyota Auto Body at its Yoshiwara plant. In December 2016, after the launching of a revised Coaster, production was transferred to the Honsha plant of a Toyota Auto Body subsidiary, Gifu Auto Body.

A number of unlicensed clones of third generation Coasters have been (and are still) made in China, including Jiangnan Motors' JNQ5041/JNQ6601, Joylong Motors' HKL6700, Golden Dragon's XML6700 and Sunlong Bus' SLK6770.

== History ==
The Toyota Coaster was introduced in 1969 as a 17-passenger minibus using the same running gear as the Toyota Dyna of the time. Early models used the 2.0-litre Toyota R engine with a 4-speed manual transmission. With its engine rated at 98 PS (72 kW), a RU19 Coaster could attain a top speed of 110 km/h (68 mph). Subsequent models used a variety of four and six-cylinder diesel and petrol engines, and an option of automatic transmission was later introduced. A smaller alternative was later introduced at Toyopet Store locations, based on the Toyota ToyoAce called the Toyota HiAce which had the ability to carry up to 10 passengers but complied with Japanese Government regulations concerning exterior dimensions and engine displacement.

In August 1997, Toyota "Coaster Hybrid EV" minibus was launched, ahead of the Prius. The Coaster Hybrid, according to Toyota, became its first production hybrid vehicle. Production of the Coaster Hybrid continued until 2007.

The LPG Coaster, fueled by liquefied petroleum gas, was developed specifically for the Hong Kong market and its air pollution problems.

The Coaster is widely used in Singapore, Japan, Hong Kong and Australia, but also in the developing world for minibus operators in Africa, the Middle East, South Asia, the Caribbean, and Latin America as public transportation. These buses are imported mainly from Asia and have the steering wheel moved to the left and the passenger door to the other side.

== First generation (U10/B10) ==
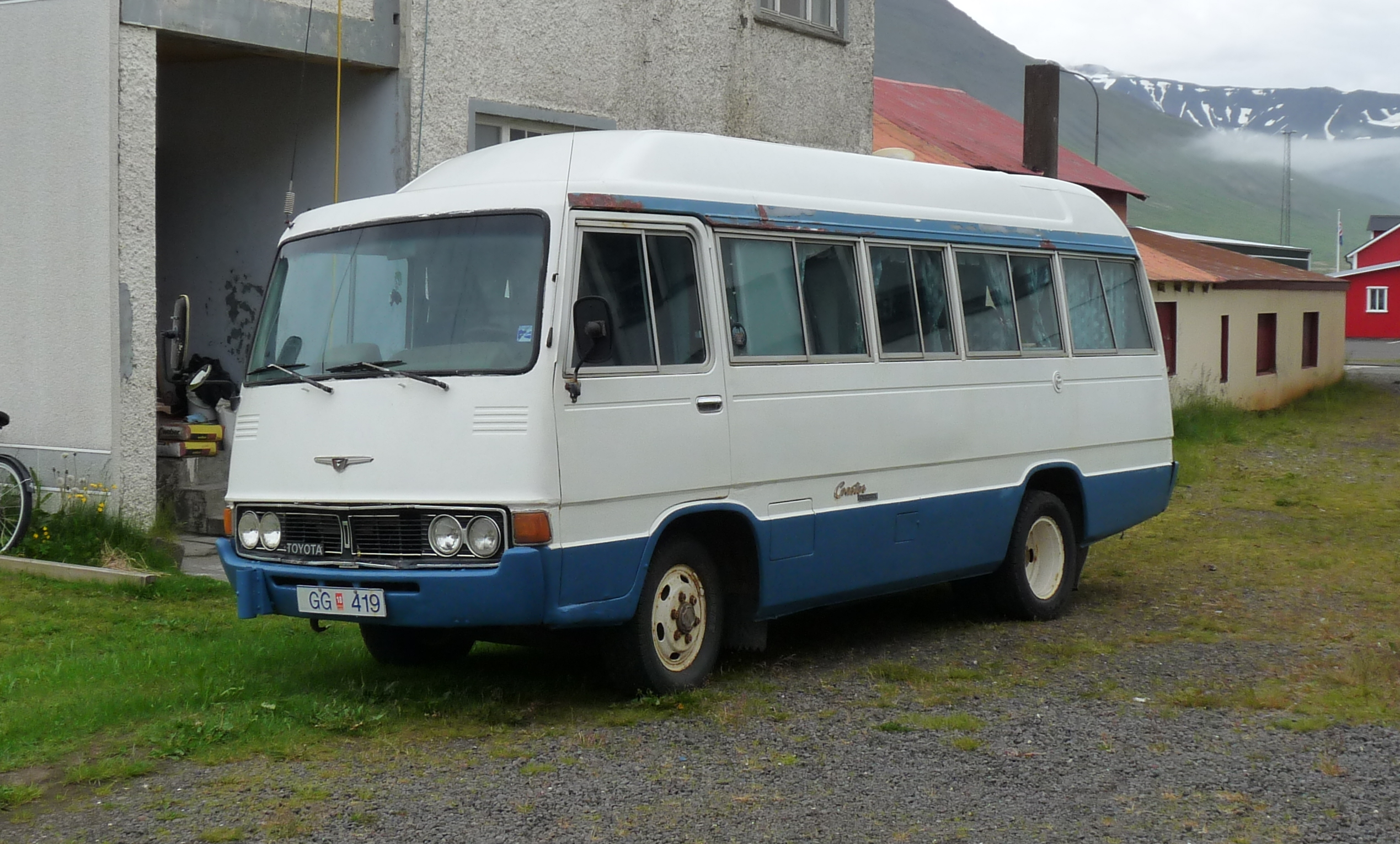
First generation Toyota Coaster

The Coaster was introduced in February 1969 in 22 and 26-seat models using the Dyna's U platform. It had the 1,994 cc (2.0 L) 5R petrol engine and the 2,481 cc (2.5 L) 2J diesel engine and was sold with the model code of RU18 and JU18. All models had a 4-speed manual gearbox with column shift. Air conditioning was available as an option on the deluxe models.

In February 1972, the 2J engine was replaced by the 2,997 cc (3.0 L) diesel B engine, which was only available with a 5-speed manual gearbox with column shift. The updated models were sold with the model codes of RU19 and BU19.

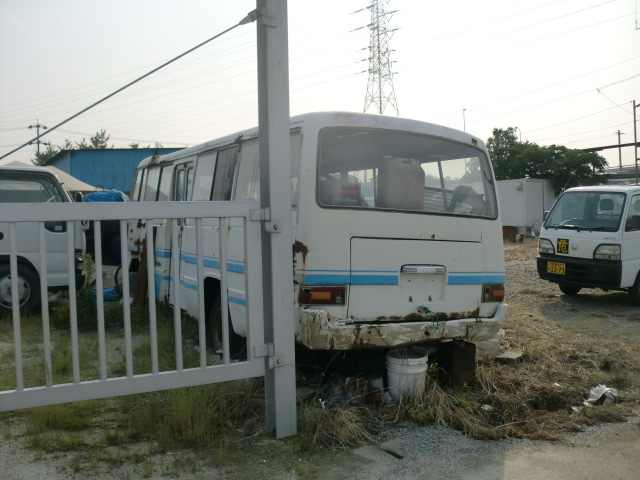
Rear view (first generation)

In August 1977, the Coaster's model platform code was changed to the B series, although the vehicle itself was mostly unchanged. The RB10 had the same 5R petrol engine as before but RB11 a 2,189 cc (2.2 L) 20R petrol engine was introduced. The B diesel engine was dropped and the 3,168 cc (3.2 L) 2B diesel engine was introduced on the B10. 21 and 25-seat models were available in addition to the previous 22 and 26-seat models. A high–roof model was added.

In November 1979, column shift gearbox selection was dropped. All gearboxes were henceforth floor shifted. The 5R petrol engine was also dropped. The front grille received a mild face lift.

In August 1980, the 2,366 cc (2.4 L) 22R petrol engine was introduced on the RB13 model.

== Second generation (B20/B30) ==
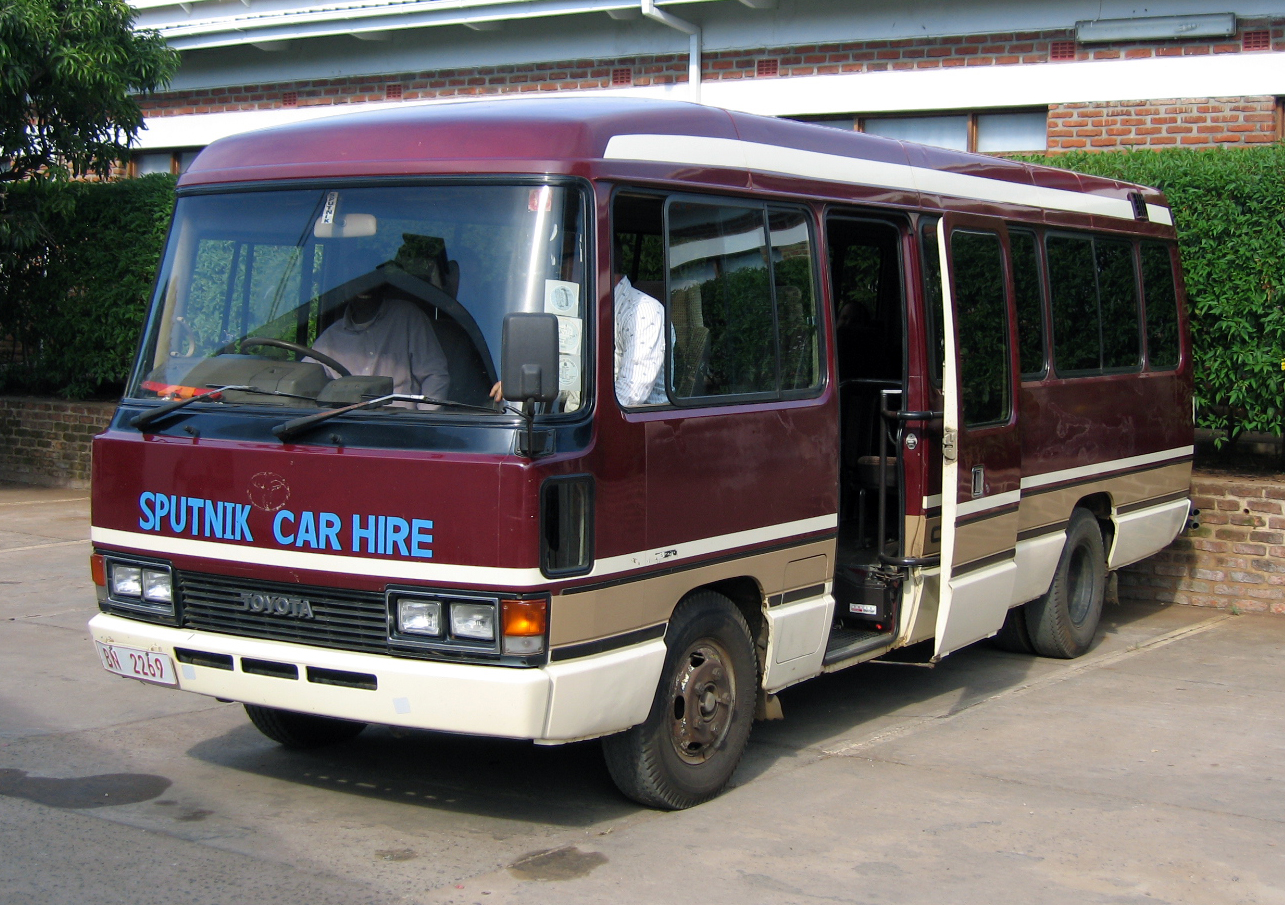
B30 Coaster

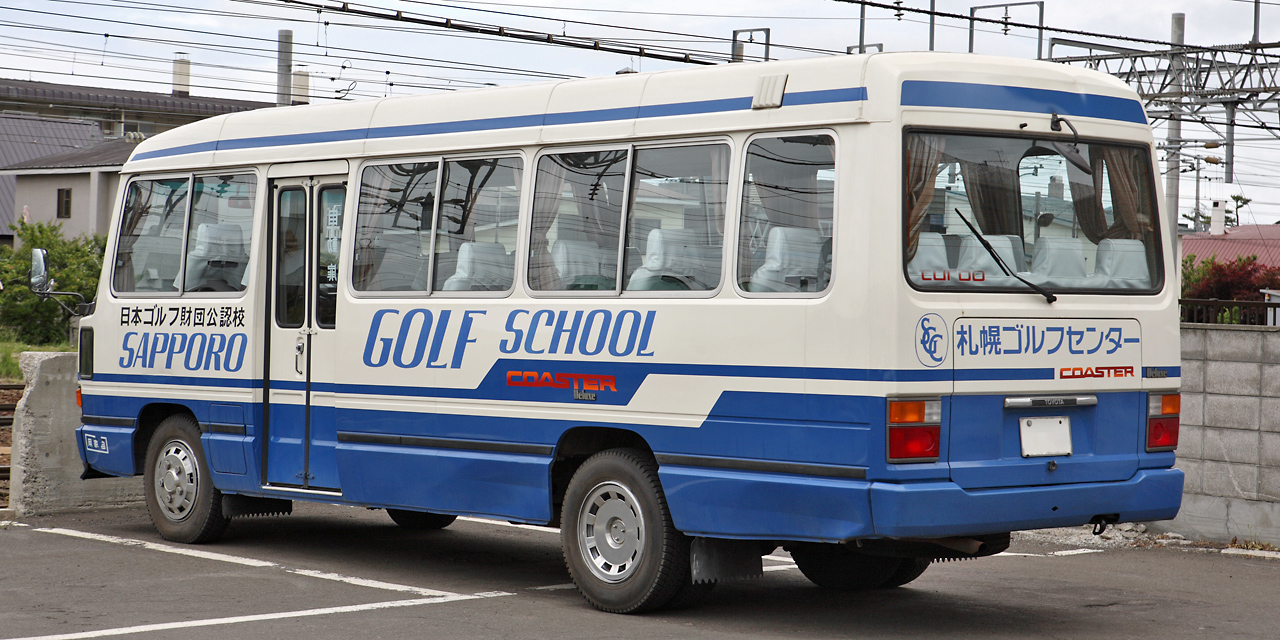
B30 Coaster rear

In May 1982, the Coaster received a major update to its body. It now had a wraparound front windscreen and thicker rear pillars. For the high-roof models, the 2-piece folding passenger door was replaced with a single piece door. The 20R petrol engine was dropped and the 2B diesel engine was replaced with the 3,431 cc (3.4 L) 3B diesel engine for the BB20. The 22R engine continued on the RB20. It was available in 16, 17, 20, 21, 22 and 26-seat models.

== Third generation (B40/B50) ==
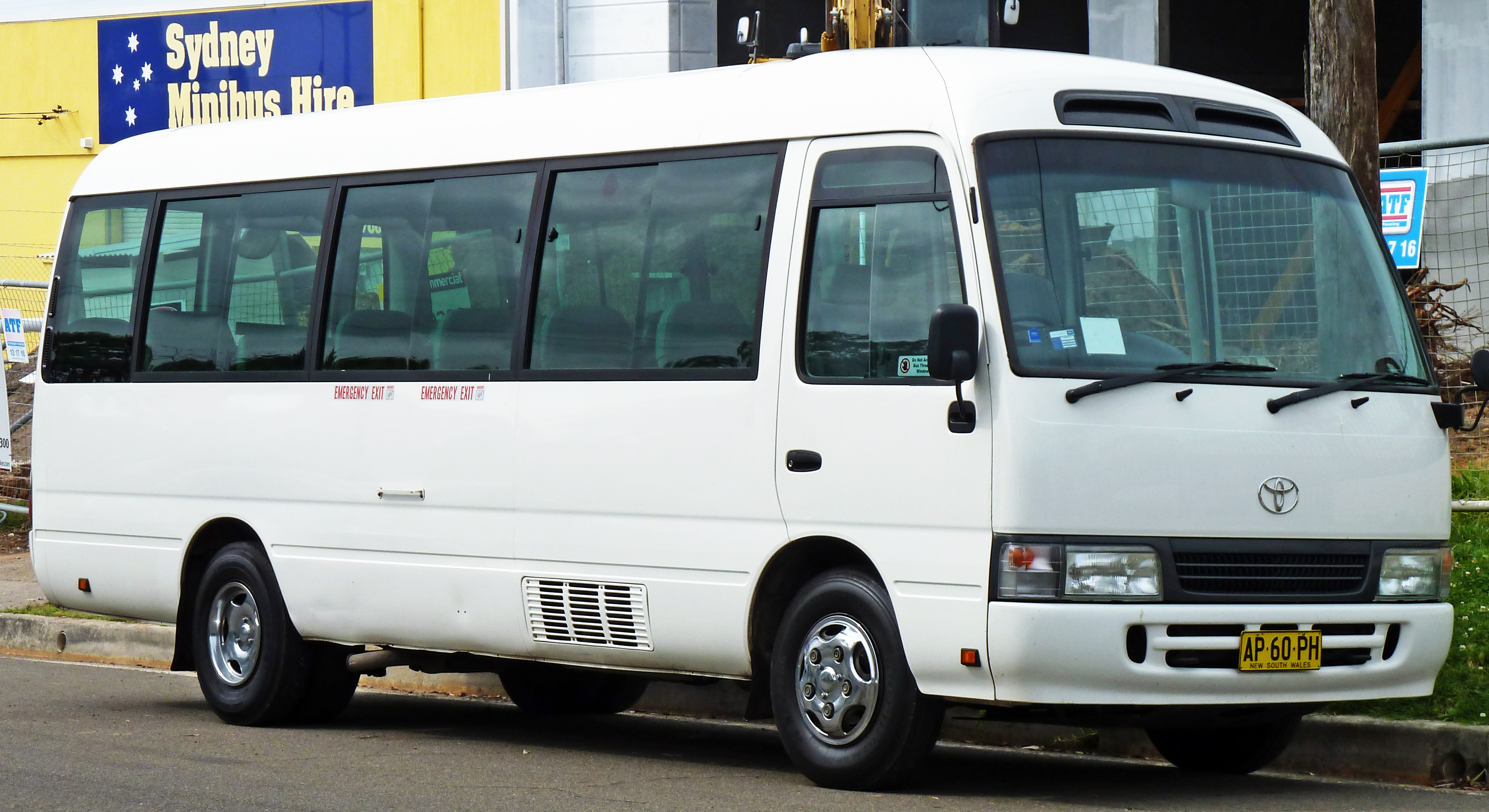
Toyota Coaster B50 (2001 facelift)

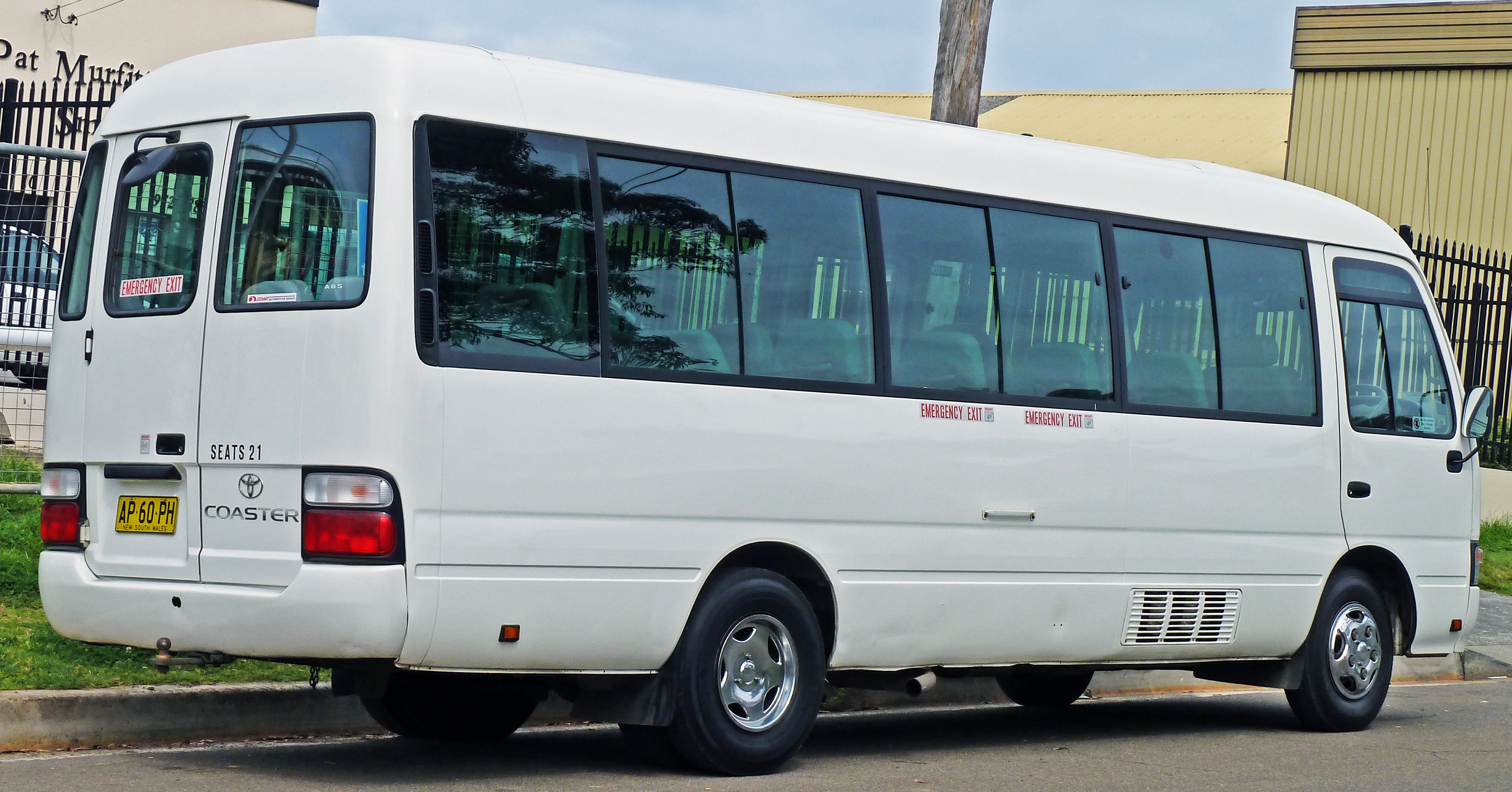
Toyota Coaster B50 (2001 facelift)

Introduced in January 1993, the new generation body was made more aerodynamic. Engines were the 4.2-litre 1HD-T turbocharged diesel, the 4.2-litre 1HZ diesel and the 3.4-litre 3B diesel.

In November 1995, the 4WD BB55/BB58 was added. The 4.1-litre 15B-F diesel engine was introduced.

In August 1997, a series hybrid EV model was added using the 1.5-litre 5E engine. It is configured where the engine is generating electricity which is supplied to the motor that drives the vehicle. The engine ran at a set RPM range and in turn led to lower noise, vibration, emissions, and better fuel economy. The engine in this configuration produces 95 PS (70 kW); it was only suitable for urban environments.

The third generation Coaster received a facelift in 2001, and again in 2007.

== Fourth generation (B60/B70/B80/B100/B110/B120) ==
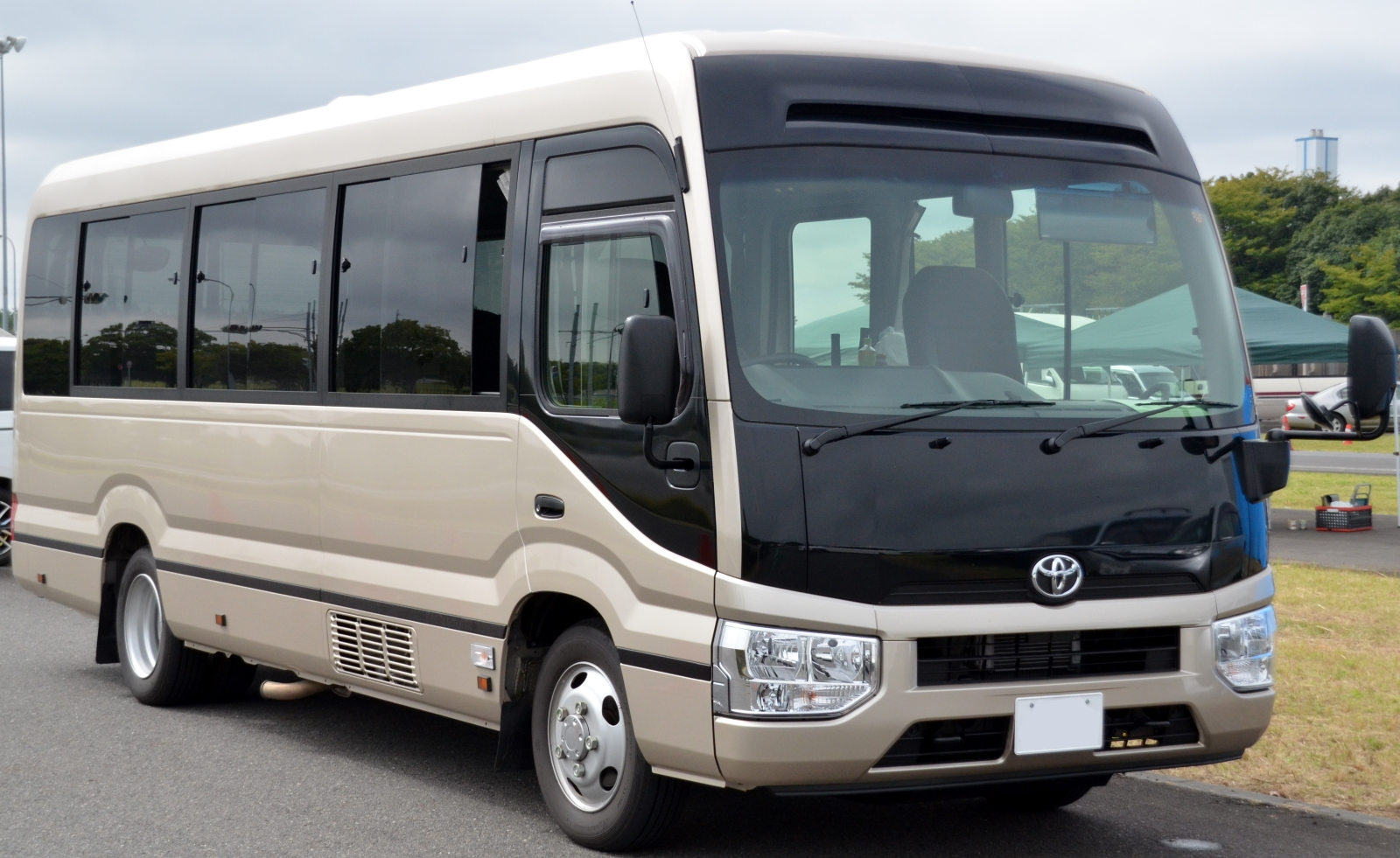
B70 Coaster

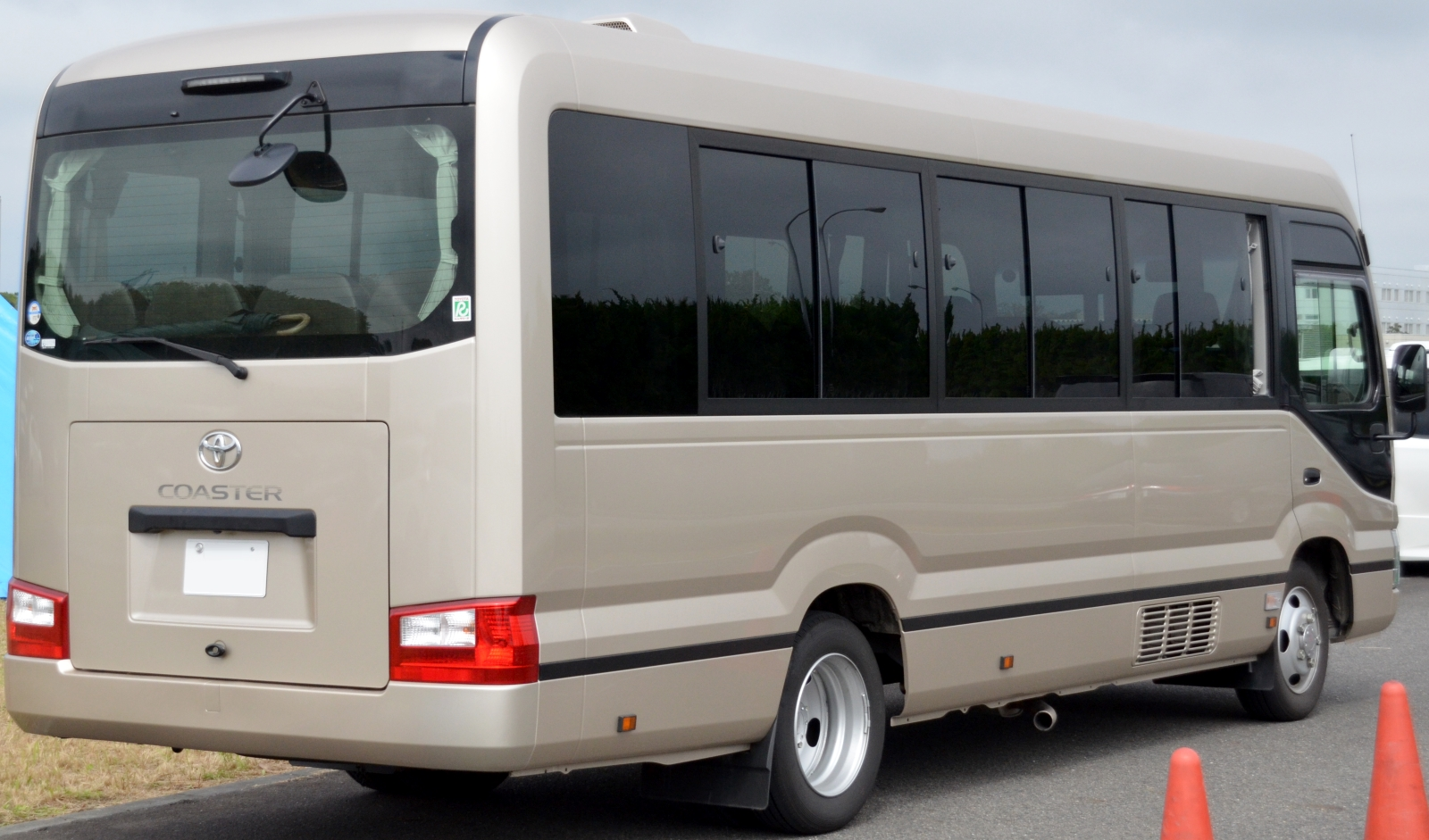
B70 Coaster rear

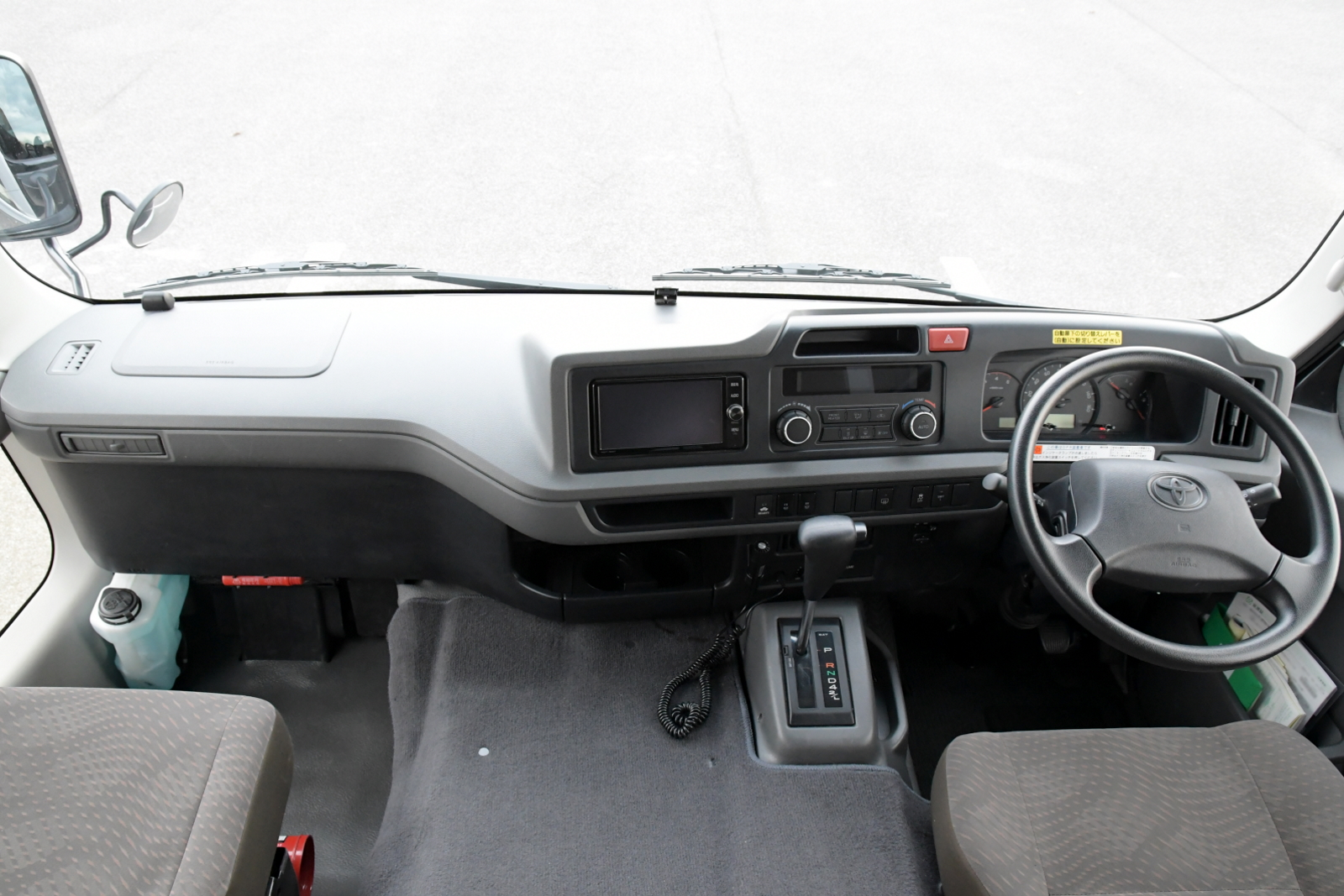
B70 Coaster interior

The fourth generation Toyota Coaster was unveiled on 22 December 2016 and was made available for purchase in Japan on 23 January 2017. It is available with the same engine choices as the outgoing model. The Coaster was the first vehicle to undergo a full redesign under Toyota's newly incorporated Commercial Vehicle (CV) company responsible for the design and development of commercial vehicles. The fourth generation Coaster incorporates many safety features as standard including air-bags for the driver and front passenger, Vehicle Stability Control (VSC), a ringed frame body for increased roll-over protection, pre-tensioners for the seat belts and force limiters which reduce the pressure on the passenger's chest in the event of a collision.

The height was increased by 60 mm (2.4 in), the width was increased by 40 mm (1.6 in) and the window height was increased by 50 mm (2.0 in) over the outgoing model. The door step were also lengthened by 65 mm (2.6 in) for easier entry and exit. The body was designed in a square shape for a more spacious seating space. The windshield was widened for increased outward visibility. The Coaster is available in three configurations; the standard wheelbase configuration can seat 25 passengers (19 passengers if used in Hong Kong as public light buses), the long wheelbase configuration can either seat 24 or 29 passengers while a school bus configuration can seat 3 adults and 49 children. The school bus configuration does not have a front passenger seat.

For Thailand, the Coaster was unveiled on 5 June 2019 with the Hino 4.0-litre common-rail diesel N04C-VL engine.

Production of models with the N04C diesel engine ended in February 2022 and were replaced by the 1GD-FTV diesel engine. In January 2026, it was replaced with the 3GD-FTV engine.

== Variants ==
- BB10 – 2B engine – First Generation diesel, 22–25 passengers
- RB20 – 22R 2.4-litre petrol engine, 26 passengers
- BB21/BB22/BB23 – 3B/13B/14B 4-cyl engine, 26 passengers (1981–1993)
- HB30 – 2H Engine, 30 passengers
- HB31 – 12H-T turbo engine for EX models, sliding door (1981–1990)
- HDB30 – 1HD-T turbo engine for EX models (1989–1993)
- HZB30 – 1HZ engine, 30 passengers (1990–1993)
- BB40 – 3B engine, 26 passenger (1993–2003)
- HZB40 – 1HZ engine, 26 passengers
- HZB50 – 1HZ engine, 30 passengers (1993–2016)
- HZB51 – 1HZ turbo engine, Intercooler 30 passengers (1993–2012)
- HDB50 – 1HD turbo engine, non airbag suspension (1993–2003)
- HDB51 – 1HD turbo engine, airbag suspension (1993–2003)
- BB50 – 15B-FTE 4-cyl turbo intercooled engine, 6-speed manual or auto (2003–2006)
- XZB50/XZB51/XZB56 - Hino N04C 4-cyl turbo intercooled engine (2004–2016)
- GDB60/GDB70/GDB80 - 1GD-FTV 4-cyl turbo intercooled engine (2022–2026)
- GDB100/GDB110/GDB120 - 3GD-FTV 4-cyl turbo intercooled engine (2026–present)
- BB55 / BB58 – 15B (1997–1999) / 15B-FT (1999–2004) 4x4 factory built, uses Toyota Mega Cruiser's transmission and front portal axle differentials

== Petrol Engines ==
Engine	Horsepower	Max. Torque	Region	Years
5R 1,994 cc (121.7 cu in)	79 kW (106 hp) at 5,200 rpm	163 N⋅m (120 lbf⋅ft) at 3,000 rpm		1969-1977
20R 2,190 cc (134 cu in)	67 kW (90 hp) at 4,800 rpm	165 N⋅m (122 lbf⋅ft) at 2,400 rpm		
22R 2,366 cc (144.4 cu in)	72 kW (97 hp) at 4,800 rpm	174 N⋅m (128 lbf⋅ft) at 2,800 rpm		
3RZ 2,693 cc (164.3 cu in)	112 kW (150 hp) at 4,800 rpm	240 N⋅m (177 lbf⋅ft) at 4,000 rpm		
2TR-FE 2,693 cc (164.3 cu in)	118 kW (158 hp) at 5,200 rpm	246 N⋅m (181 lbf⋅ft) at 3,800 rpm		
3F 3,995 cc (243.8 cu in)	116 kW (155 hp) at ? rpm	303 N⋅m (223 lbf⋅ft) at ? rpm		
6GR 3,956 cc (241.4 cu in)	171 kW (229 hp) at 5,000 rpm	345 N⋅m (254 lbf⋅ft) at 4,400 rpm		2013

== Diesel Engines ==
Engine	Power	Torque	Region	Years
2J 2,481 cc (151.4 cu in)	51 kW (70 PS) at 3,600 rpm	0 N⋅m (0 lbf⋅ft) at ? rpm		-
B 2,977 cc (181.7 cu in)	59 kW (80 PS) at 3,600 rpm	191 N⋅m (141 lbf⋅ft) at 2,200 rpm		-
2B 3,168 cc (193.3 cu in)	68 kW (93 PS) at 2,200 rpm	215 N⋅m (159 lbf⋅ft) at 2,200 rpm		-
3B 3,432 cc (209.4 cu in)	66 kW (90 PS) at 3,500 rpm	217 N⋅m (160 lbf⋅ft) at 2,000 rpm		-
13B 3,432 cc (209.4 cu in)	74 kW (100 PS) at ? rpm	235 N⋅m (173 lbf⋅ft) at ? rpm		-
14B 3,681 cc (224.6 cu in)	73 kW (98 hp) at 3,400 rpm	240 N⋅m (177 lbf⋅ft) at 1,800 rpm		-
2H 3,980 cc (243 cu in)	80 kW (107 hp) at 3,500 rpm	240 N⋅m (177 lbf⋅ft) at 2,000 rpm		-
12H-T 3,980 cc (243 cu in)	100 kW (134 hp) at 3,500 rpm	315 N⋅m (232 lbf⋅ft) at 1,800 rpm		-
15B-F 4,104 cc (250.4 cu in)	86 kW (115 hp) at 3,200 rpm	290 N⋅m (214 lbf⋅ft) at 2,000 rpm		1993-1999
15B-FT 4,104 cc (250.4 cu in)	101 kW (136 hp) at ? rpm	0 N⋅m (0 lbf⋅ft) at ? rpm		1999-2003
15B-FTE 4,104 cc (250.4 cu in)	114 kW (153 hp) at 3,200 rpm	382 N⋅m (282 lbf⋅ft) at 1,800 rpm		2003-2006
1HZ 4,164 cc (254.1 cu in)	96 kW (129 hp) at 3,800 rpm	285 N⋅m (210 lbf⋅ft) at 2,200 rpm		-
1HD 4,164 cc (254.1 cu in)	122 kW (164 hp) at 3,600 rpm	361 N⋅m (266 lbf⋅ft) at 1,400 rpm		1990-1995
Hino N04C series 4,009 cc (244.6 cu in)	110 kW (148 hp) at 2,800 rpm	420 N⋅m (310 lbf⋅ft) at 1,400 rpm	Japan, Worldwide	-
1GD-FTV 2,755 cc (168.1 cu in)	129 kW (175 PS) at 3,400 rpm	420 N⋅m (310 lbf⋅ft) at 1600 - 2,800 rpm	Japan, Worldwide	2022–present
3GD-FTV 2,999 cc (183.0 cu in)	123 kW (167 PS) at 2,600 rpm	452 N⋅m (333 lbf⋅ft) at 1,600 - 2,600 rpm	Japan	2026–present

== Conversions ==
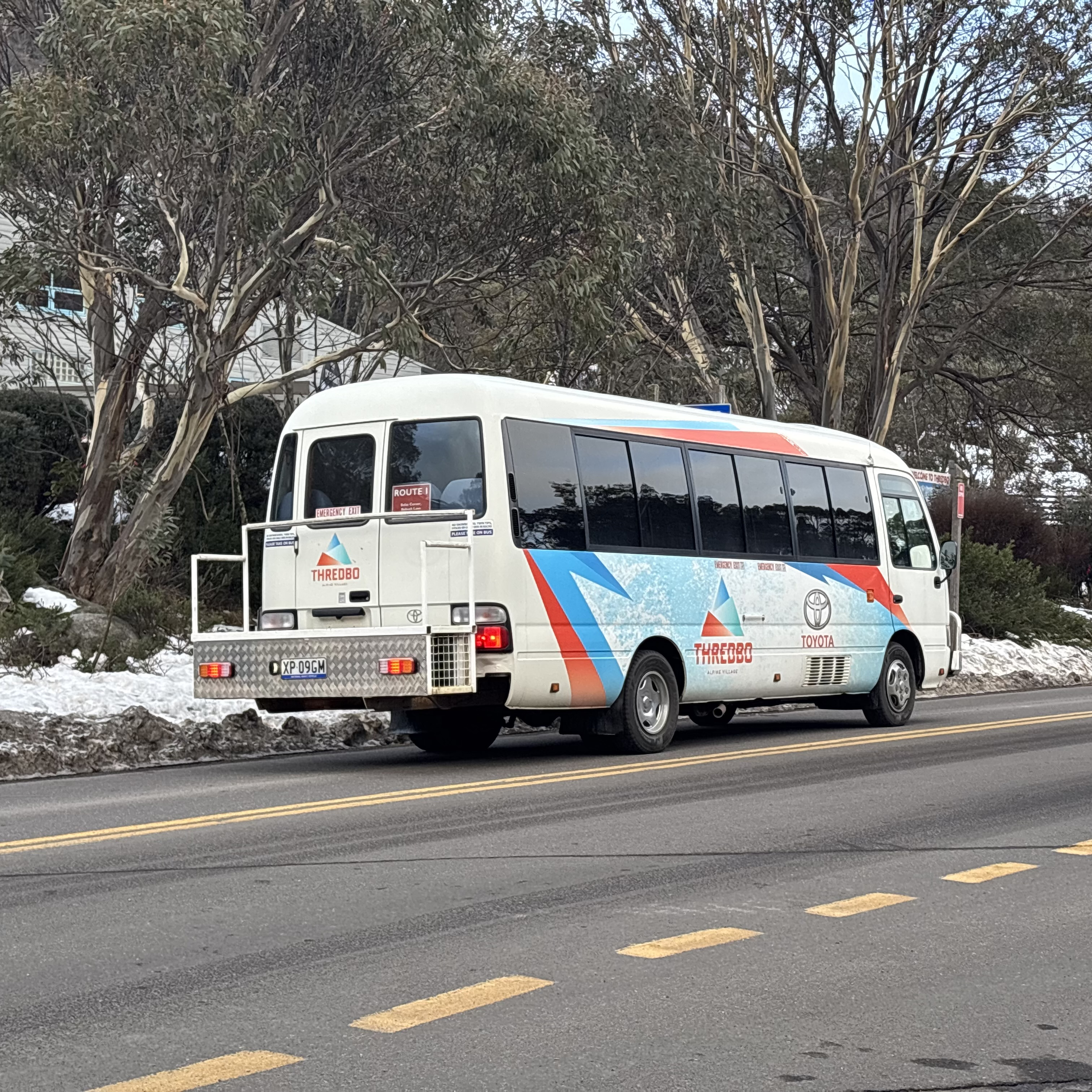
Coaster with a custom ski rack

The Toyota Coaster is used for motor home conversions. Retired Coasters are converted for home use by removal of most of the passenger seats, and the addition of beds, kitchens, TV, sink, water tanks, annexes and other fixtures.

The Toyota Coaster has also been used as a road–rail vehicle on the Asato Line with extensive DMV modifications such as an elongated bonnet that houses a mechanism that deploys the front steel wheels and lowers the rear steel wheels which allows the vehicle to run on rails. The original rear axles still move the vehicle in rail mode.

== See also ==
- List of Toyota vehicles
