= Toyota B engine =

The Toyota B engine family was a series of inline-four diesel engines.

Toyota also had a 3.4 L (3389 cc) inline-six gasoline engine from 1937 to 1947 that was also called the B engine. The earlier engine was used in early Toyota cars and trucks and in the first version of the Land Cruiser when it was known as the BJ Jeep. The later engine was used in later versions of the Land Cruiser. The two engines are unrelated and were not made at the same time.

Toyota made 5 generations of the B family engines, each one identified with a number before the B letter. Also, Toyota uses a series of letters to identify technical improvements to their engines:

- The number 1 (one) before the number of the engine model means that the engine uses direct injection, otherwise, indirect injection

- The F letter after the B letter means that the engine is multivalvular. Since the B family are inline-fours, that means that the engine uses 16 valves.

- The T letter, means that the engine is turbocharged

- The E letter, means that the engine is electronically controlled engine control unit (ECU)

For example, the 15B-FTE Engine is the fifth generation of the B engines, comes with 16 valves, is turbocharged, direct-injected and uses an ECU.

In August 1988, Toyota released re-designed B series engines (specifically the B, 3B and 11B) with a number of improvements. A mono-block design (with no cylinder liners) was adopted. An onboard, timing gear driven vacuum pump replaced a previously alternator-driven vacuum pump (Later a gear-driven power steering pump would be added to the 3B, 14B and 15B platforms). Camshafts gained larger bearing journals and roller lifters replaced earlier solid lifters. Pushrod inspection galleries disappeared to make a more solid engine block. The flywheel changed from 6 to 8 bolts and a PCV hose replaced the road draft tube. Toyota does not make a distinction in the naming of these engines, but in user communities the August 1988-on 3B is referred to as the '3B-II'.

== Features at a glance ==
Code	Capacity (cc)	Bore (mm)	Stroke (mm)	Direct injection	Turbo	Intercooler	Power	Torque
B	2977	95	105				80 hp (60 kW) ar 3,600 rpm.	141 lb·ft (191N·m) at 2,200 rpm.
11B	2977	95	105	yes				
2B	3168	98	105				93 hp (69 kW) at 2,200 rpm.	159 ft·lbf (215 N·m) at 2,200 rpm.
3B	3432	102	105				90 hp (67 kW) at 3,500 rpm	160 ft·lbf (217N·m) at 2,000 rpm.
13B	3432	102	105	yes				
13B-T	3432	102	105	yes	yes		120 hp (89 kW) at 3,400 rpm.	159 ft·lbf (217N·m) at 2,200 rpm.
4B	3661	102	112					
14B	3661	102	112	yes			98 hp (72 kW) at 3,400 rpm	177 lb·fts (240N·m) at 1,800 rpm.
14B-T	3661	102	112	yes	yes			
15B-F	4104	108	112	yes			86 kW (115 hp) at 3,200 rpm	290N·m (214 ft·lbf) at 2,000 rpm.
15B-FTE	4104	108	112	yes	yes	yes	114 kW (153 hp) at 3,200 rpm	382N·m (282 ft·lbf) at 1,800 rpm.

== B ==
B

Overview
- Manufacturer: Toyota

Layout
- Displacement: 2,977 cc
- Cylinder bore: 95.0 mm
- Piston stroke: 105.0 mm
- Cylinder block material: cast-iron
- Cylinder head material: cast-iron
- Valvetrain: OHV

Combustion
- Fuel type: diesel

The B is a 3.0 L inline-four eight-valve OHV diesel engine. Compression ratio is 21:1. Output is 80 PS (59 kW) at 3,600 rpm, with 19.5 kg⋅m (191 N⋅m; 141 lb⋅ft) of torque at 2,200 rpm. Later versions claim 85 PS (63 kW) and 20 kg⋅m (196 N⋅m; 145 lb⋅ft). Versions of the B made from August 1988 onwards are informally referred to as a 'B-II' and share the same engine block casting as the 11B.

Applications

- Land Cruiser 40
- Dyna 3rd, 4th, 5th generation
- Toyoace 5th generation
- Daihatsu Delta V9/V12-series
- 1978-19?? Hino Ranger 2 (V10)

== 2B ==
2B

Overview
- Manufacturer: Toyota

Layout
- Displacement: 3,168 cc
- Cylinder bore: 98.0 mm
- Piston stroke: 105.0 mm
- Cylinder block material: cast-iron
- Cylinder head material: cast-iron
- Valvetrain: OHV

Combustion
- Fuel type: diesel

The 2B is a 3.2 L inline 4 eight valve OHV diesel engine. Compression ratio is 21:1. Output is 93 PS (68 kW) at 2,200 rpm, with 21.9 kg⋅m (215 N⋅m; 158 lb⋅ft) of torque at 2,200 rpm.

Applications

- Land Cruiser (BJ41/44 JDM)
- Coaster (BB10/11/15)

== 3B ==
3B

Overview
- Manufacturer: Toyota

Layout
- Displacement: 3,432 cc
- Cylinder bore: 102.0 mm
- Piston stroke: 105.0 mm
- Cylinder block material: cast-iron
- Cylinder head material: cast-iron
- Valvetrain: OHV

Combustion
- Fuel type: diesel

The 3B is a 3.4 L inline 4 eight valve OHV diesel engine. Compression ratio is 20:1. Output is 90 hp (67 kW) at 3,500 rpm with 160 ft·lbf (217 N·m) of torque at 2,000 rpm. The 3B was offered with both in-line and rotary diesel injection pumps. Versions of the 3B made from August 1988 onwards are informally referred to as a '3Bii' and share the same engine block casting as the 14B. All post August 1988 3Bs have rotary diesel injection pumps.

Applications

- Dyna 4th, 5th, 6th generation
- Toyoace 4th, 5th generation
- Landcruiser 40/60/70
- Coaster 2nd, 3rd generation

== 4B ==
4B

Overview
- Manufacturer: Toyota

Layout
- Displacement: 3,661 cc
- Cylinder bore: 102.0 mm
- Piston stroke: 112.0 mm
- Cylinder block material: cast-iron
- Cylinder head material: cast-iron
- Valvetrain: OHV

Combustion
- Fuel type: diesel

The 4B is a 3.7-litre inline-four eight-valve OHV diesel engine of the swirl chamber type. The 4B was only sold on the Japanese domestic market. The 4B was released in 1999 at the time that production of the 3B ceased. Unusually, the indirect injection 4B was released considerably later than the equivalent direct injection 14B engine, which was released in 1988.

Applications

- QuickDelivery (third generation)

== 11B ==
11B

Overview
- Manufacturer: Toyota

Layout
- Displacement: 2,977 cc
- Cylinder bore: 95.0 mm
- Piston stroke: 102.0 mm
- Cylinder block material: cast-iron
- Cylinder head material: cast-iron
- Valvetrain: OHV

Combustion
- Fuel type: diesel

The 11B was released in 1985 and is a direct injection version of the original B engine. Power is 90 PS (66 kW) and max torque is 21.0 kg⋅m (206 N⋅m; 152 lb⋅ft). In August 1988 an updated version of the 11B was released, similar to the informally named 'Bii' and '3Bii'.

== 13B ==
13B

Overview
- Manufacturer: Toyota

Layout
- Displacement: 3,432 cc
- Cylinder bore: 102.0 mm
- Piston stroke: 105.0 mm
- Cylinder block material: cast-iron
- Cylinder head material: cast-iron
- Valvetrain: OHV

Combustion
- Fuel type: diesel

The 13B is a direct injection version of the 3B engine. Output for 1985 versions is 100 PS (74 kW) and 24.0 kg⋅m (235 N⋅m; 174 lb⋅ft).

=== 13B-T ===
The 13B-T is a turbocharged version of the 13B engine, with a compression ratio of 17.6:1. Output is 120 hp (89 kW) at 3,400 rpm with 159 ft·lbf (217 N·m) of torque at 2,200 rpm. The later "LASRE" version has 130 PS (96 kW) at 3,400 rpm and 30.0 kg⋅m (294 N⋅m; 217 lb⋅ft) at 2,000 rpm.

The 13B did not receive the full suite of improvements in August 1988 that the B, 3B and 11B received. At this time, the 13B received an 8 bolt flywheel and larger camshaft, but retained cylinder liners and pushrod inspection galleries. All versions of the 13B/13B-T came with in-line injection pumps. Production of the 13B/13B-T ended in 1989.

Applications

- Land Cruiser (BJ71&74)

== 14B ==
14B

Overview
- Manufacturer: Toyota

Layout
- Displacement: 3,661 cc
- Cylinder bore: 102.0 mm
- Piston stroke: 112.0 mm
- Cylinder block material: cast-iron
- Cylinder head material: cast-iron
- Valvetrain: OHV

Combustion
- Fuel type: diesel

The 14B is a 3.7 L (3661 cc) inline-four eight-valve OHV direct injection diesel engine. Compression ratio is 18:1. Output is 98 hp (72 kW) at 3,400 rpm with 177 lb·fts (240 N·m) of torque at 1,800 rpm. The 14B was launched in 1988 at the same time as the updated B, 3B and 11B. Unlike the 11B and 13B engines, the 14B did not evolve from an earlier indirect-injection engine. All 14B engines have rotary diesel injection pumps.

Applications

- Toyota Dyna/Toyoace
- Toyota Coaster
- Toyota Bandeirante
- Daihatsu Delta V11-series

=== 14B-T ===
The 14B-T is a 3.7 L (3661 cc) inline-four eight-valve OHV direct injection turbocharged diesel engine. Output is 140 PS (103 kW) at 3400 rpm with 34.0 kg.m (333 Nm) of torque.

Yamaha marinised the 14B-T to make the Yamaha ME372 engine. Output is 165 hp (123 kW).

Applications

- Dyna/Toyoace

== 15B ==
15B

Overview
- Manufacturer: Toyota

Layout
- Displacement: 4,104 cc
- Cylinder bore: 108.0 mm
- Piston stroke: 112.0 mm
- Cylinder block material: cast-iron
- Cylinder head material: cast-iron
- Valvetrain: OHV

Combustion
- Fuel type: diesel

=== 15B-T ===
The 15B-T was supplied only to the Japanese Armed Forces. Based on a 14B-T, it is presumed to be bored out to a 4.1 L (4104 cc) inline 4 cylinder, eight valve, OHV, direct (mechanical) injection, intercooled, turbocharged diesel engine. It was found in the earliest versions of the BXD-10 Megacruiser before the 1995 release of the 15B-FT. Visually it is nearly identical to the 14B-T but can be distinguished by having no external piston-cooling oil nozzles as found on the 3Bii, 14B and 14B-T versions of the engine block. Both '3B' and '14B' castings are machined off the engine block replaced by a simple '15B' stamp, and a separate '15' casting behind the diesel injection pump. The 15B-T is the only 15B engine to have a Toyota CT26 turbocharger.

=== 15B-F ===
The 15B-F is a 4.1 L (4104 cc) inline 4 cylinder, sixteen valve, OHV, direct injection diesel engine. Bore is 108 mm and stroke is 112 mm. Output is 86 kW (115 hp) at 3,200 rpm and 290 N⋅m (214 ft⋅lbf) of torque at 2,000 rpm.

Applications

- 1993-1999 Coaster (4×4 BB58)
- 1996-1999 Toyota Dyna BU112

=== 15B-FT ===
The 15B-FT is a 4.1 L (4104 cc) inline 4 cylinder, sixteen valve, OHV, mechanical injection, turbo, intercooled diesel engine. Bore is 108 mm and stroke is 112 mm. Output is 101 kW (136 hp).

Applications

- 05/1995-12/2002 Dyna (BU212L-TKMRX3)
- 1999-2003 Coaster (4×4 BB58)
- 1996-1999 Mega Cruiser (4×4 BXD20)
- Toyota Mega Cruiser (BXD10 military vehicle)

=== 15B-FTE ===
The 15B-FTE is a 4.1 L (4104 cc) inline 4 cylinder, sixteen valve, OHV, electronic direct injection, turbo, intercooled diesel engine. Bore is 108 mm and stroke is 112 mm, with a compression ratio of 17.8:1. Output is 114 kW (153 hp) at 3,200 rpm with 382 N⋅m (282 ft⋅lbf) of torque at 1,800 rpm.

Applications

- 1999-2001 Mega CruiserBXD20
- 2003-2006 Coaster (BB50-BB58)
- Mega Cruiser (BXD10 military vehicle)
- 1999-2011 Hino Dutro

== 1BZ-FPE ==
1BZ

Overview
- Manufacturer: Toyota
- Production: 2002-

Layout
- Configuration: Inline 4
- Displacement: 4.1L (4104 cc)
- Cylinder bore: 108mm
- Piston stroke: 112mm
- Valvetrain: OHV
- Valvetrain drive system: Gear
- Compression ratio: 9.5:1

RPM range
- Max. engine speed: 4000

Combustion
- Management: Electronically Controlled Carburetor
- Fuel type: LPG
- Cooling system: Liquid Cooled

Output
- Power output: 114 hp
- Torque output: 306 Nm

Dimensions
- Dry weight: 295 kg

The 1BZ-FPE is a 4.1 L (4104 cc) 16-valve, overhead valve, spark-ignited equivalent to the 15B-F. It produces 84 kW (113 hp) at 3600 rpm and 306 N⋅m (226 lbf⋅ft) at 2000 rpm. It comes fitted to LPG-fueled versions of the Dyna and the Coaster in selected Asian markets since 2002.
