= Hino Liesse =

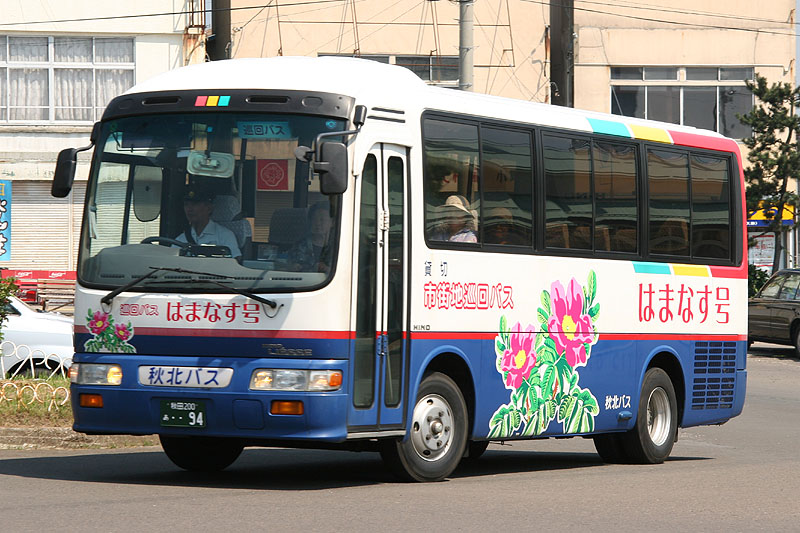

Overview
- Manufacturer: Hino
- Also called: Toyota Coaster R; Isuzu Journey-J; Toyota Coaster (Liesse II)
- Production: 1995–2011 (Liesse I); 1996–present (Liesse II)

Body and chassis
- Class: Minibus
- Body style: Single-decker bus Single-decker coach
- Doors: 1 or 2
- Floor type: Step entrance
- Related: Hino Poncho

Powertrain
- Engine: Hino J05C, J05D, N04C-VL, 3GD-FTV (2026–present)
- Transmission: 5-speed manual 3-speed automatic

Dimensions
- Length: 6.6m to 8.8m
- Width: 2.5m
- Height: 3.0m

Chronology
- Predecessor: Hino Rainbow RB/AB

The Hino Liesse (kana:日野・リエッセ) is a step-floor minibus built by the Japanese automaker Hino Motors from 1995 to present. The range is primarily available as a city bus and a tourist coach.

== Liesse ==
- KC-RX4JFAA (1995)
- KK-RX4JFEA (1999)
- PB-RX6JFAA (2004)
- BDG-RX6JFBA (2007)
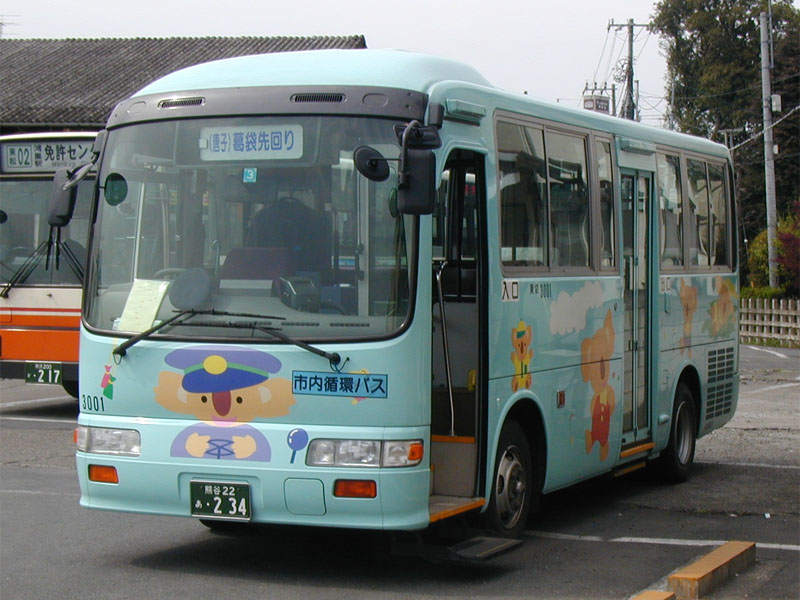
Liesse KC-RX4JFAA

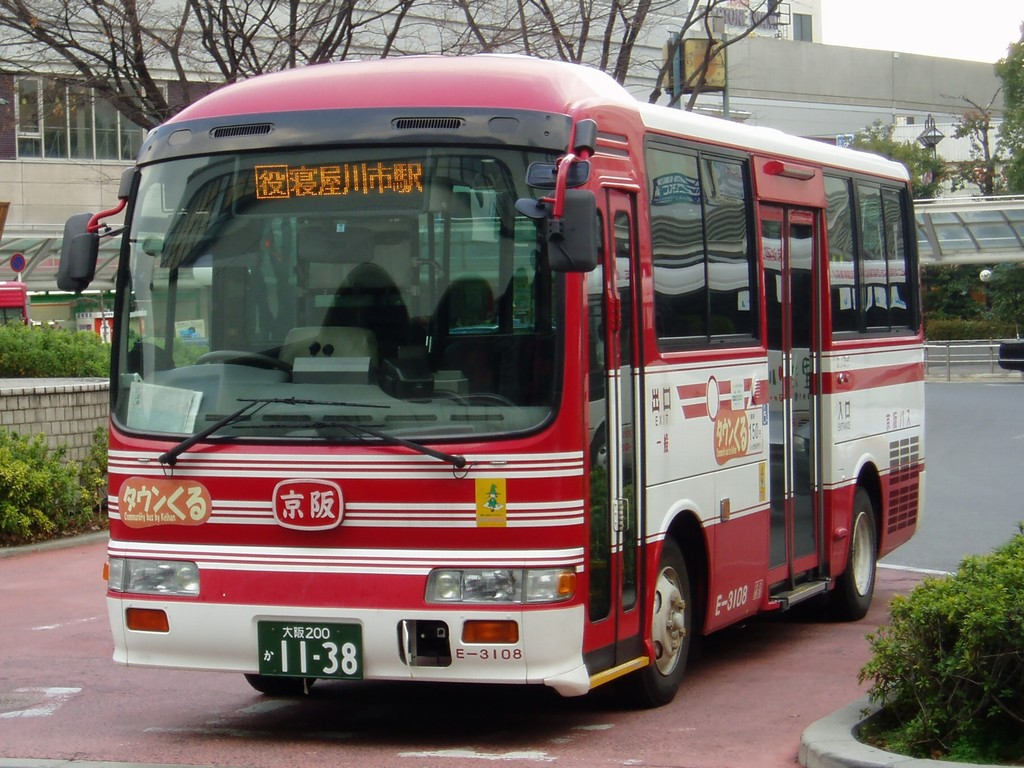
Liesse KK-RX4JFEA

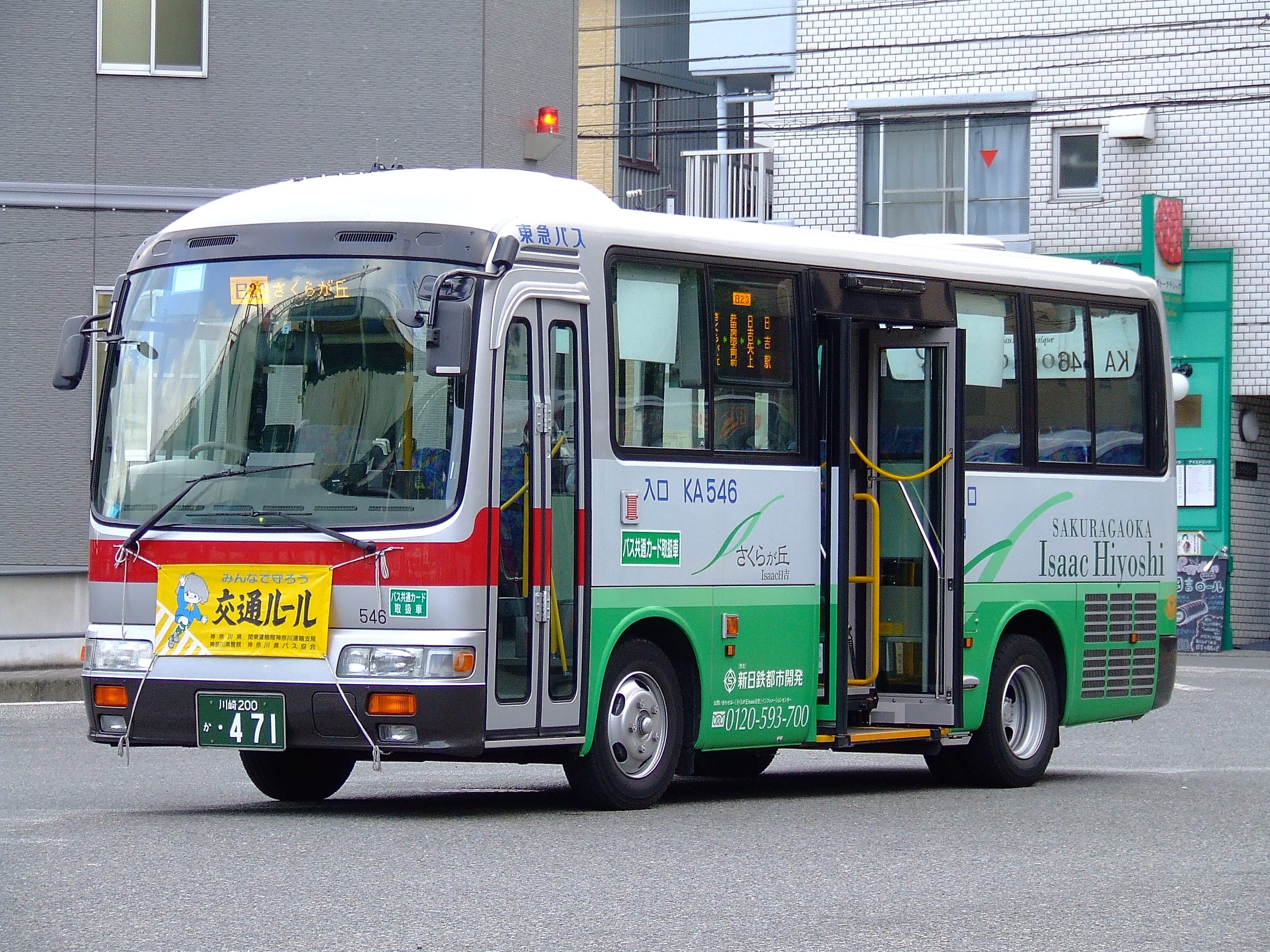
Liesse PB-RX6JFAA

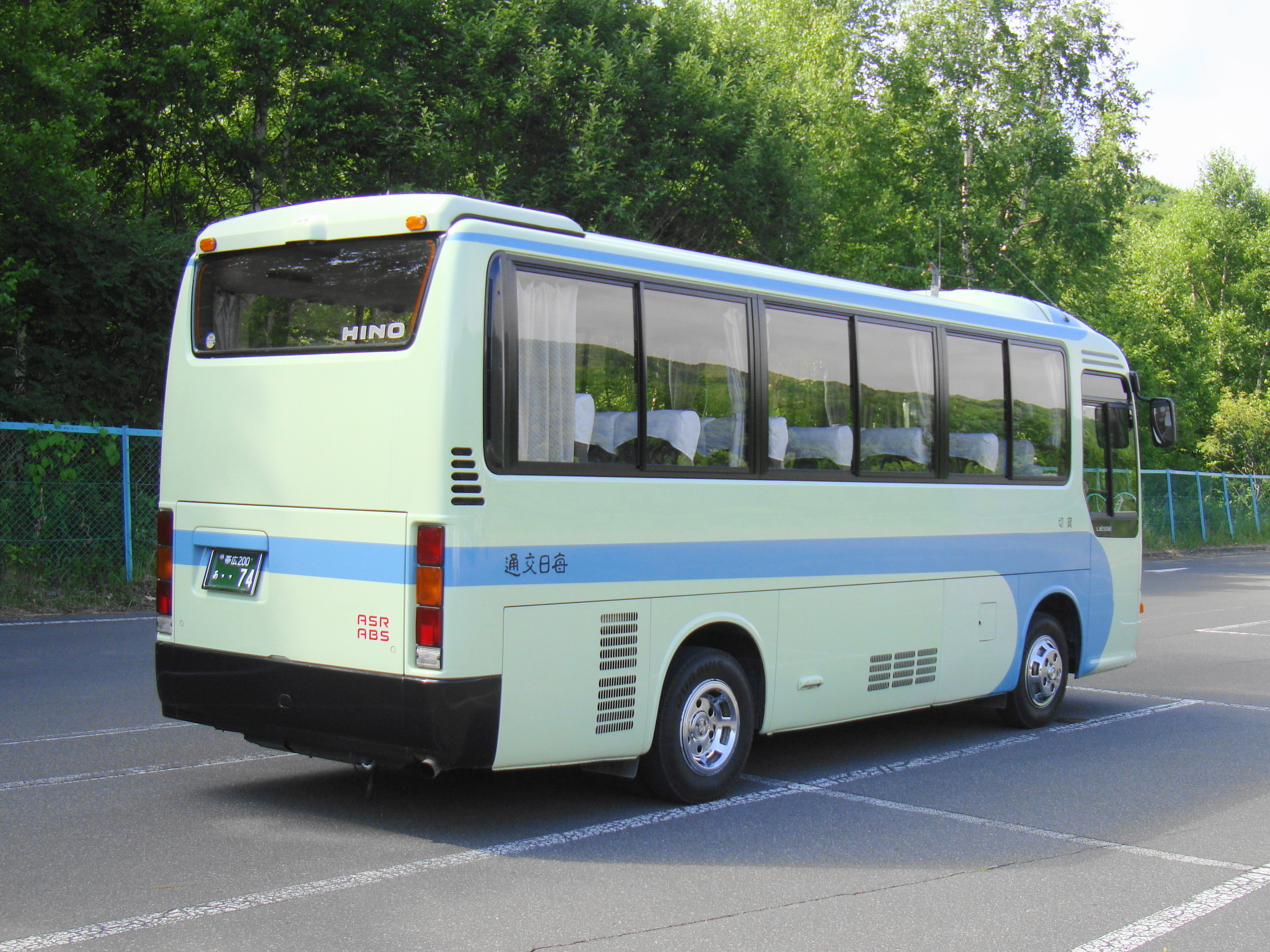
Rear view of Liesse

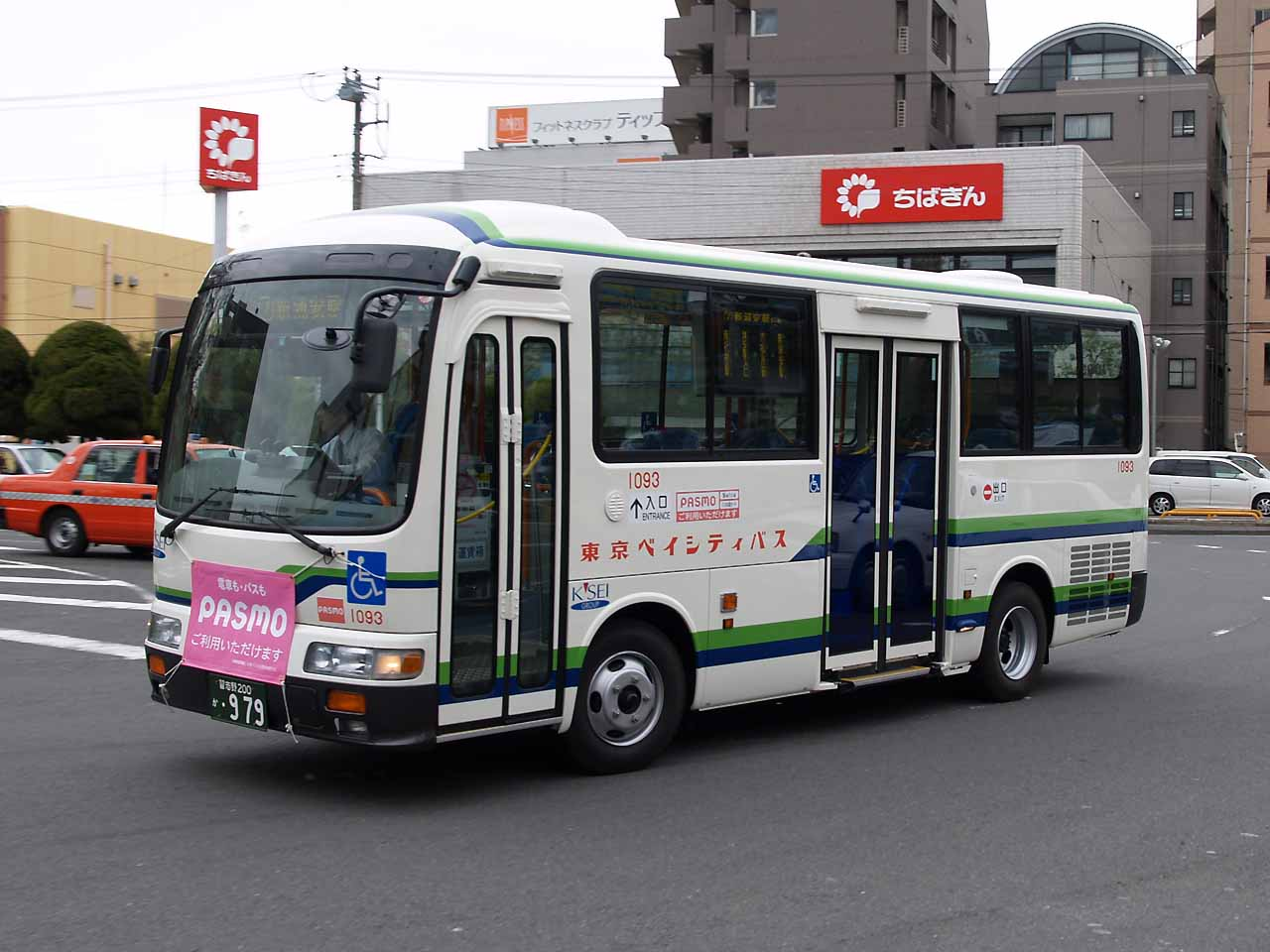
Isuzu Journey-J

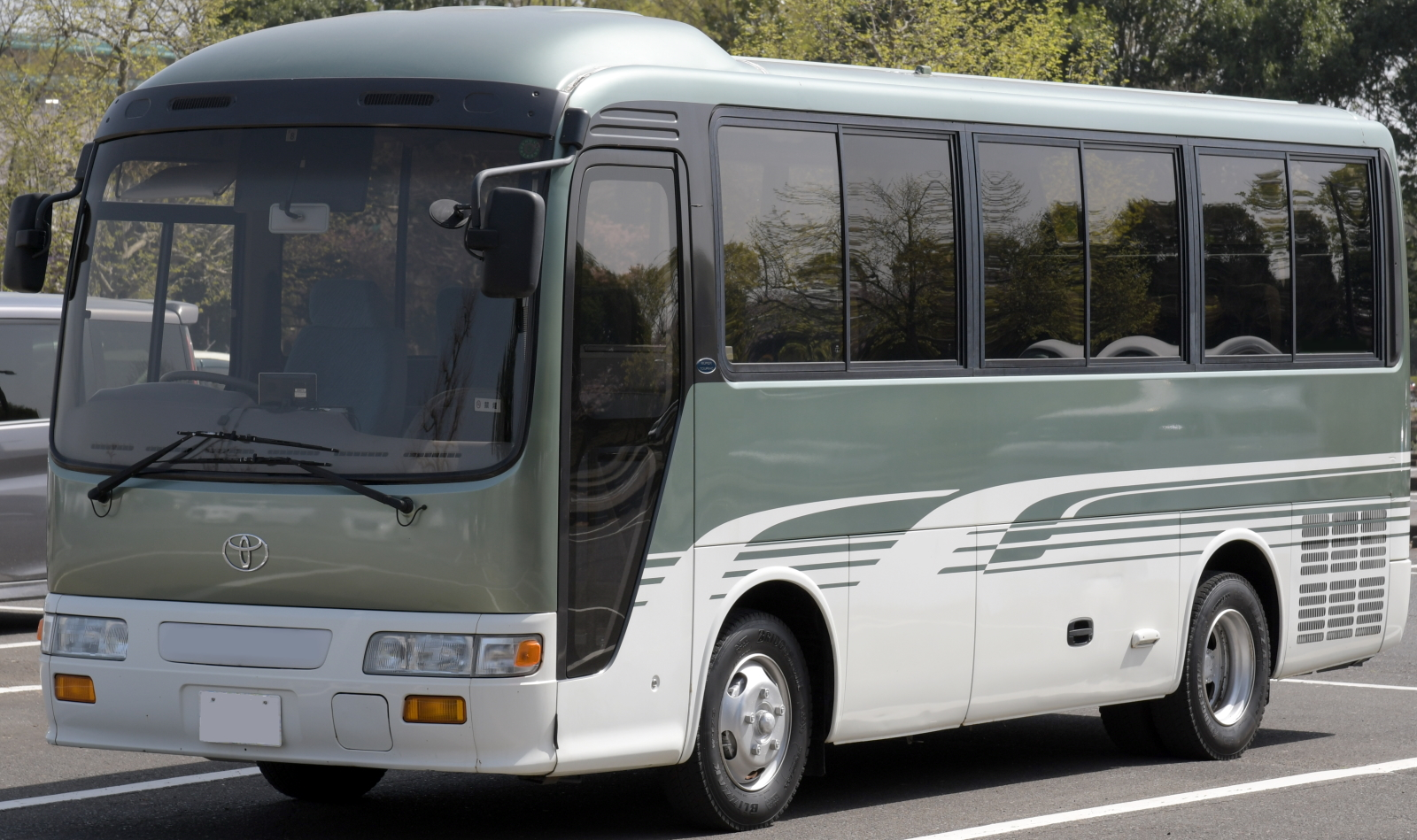
Toyota Coaster R

== Liesse II ==
=== First Generation (1996) ===
- KC-HZB/HDB/BB40/50 (1996)
- KK-HZB/HDB/BB40/50 (1999)
- PB-XZB40/XZB46/XZB50/XZB51/XZB56 (2004)
- BDG/PDG-XZB40/50, LD-BZB40/BZB50 (2007)

The Hino Liesse II was a badge engineered Toyota Coaster. Power for the Liesse II came from either Toyota's 1HD, 1HZ, or Hino's N04C diesel engine. The LPG version was motored by the Toyota's 1BZ-FPE engine. The Liesse II was offered as the 40-series short body and 50-series long body with the choice of standard roof or high roof.

Model grades were Deluxe, LX, GX, EX, and Super Lounge, as well as the Infant Vehicle and Big Van. Air suspension was only for the long body high roof EX and Super Lounge. The top-of-the-line Super Lounge has 20 seats and bigger aisle between seat-row. It also features the 180-degrees rotating seats on the second-to-last row, folding down rearmost seats for additional trunk space, and standard hand grip, cup holder and hanging-hook for all passengers, and armrest for the seats near the aisle. The Infant Vehicle has the choice of capacity of 3 adults and 39 or 49 children. The Big Van only seats 9 but can accommodates 1,250 kg payload of goods. Other models offered the choices for 26 or 29 passengers.

Touring Package was available for the GX and EX. It consisted of fabric sun visor and sticker holder, passageway carpet with floor drainage holes, step mat, and umbrella stand, and for the EX only was the additional of audience seat's cup holder, seat pocket, and hook. Other options were 40-litre bottle cooler and TV & DVD player.

In 2007, the Liesse II received a facelift noticeably with the new headlights, grille, and front bumper.

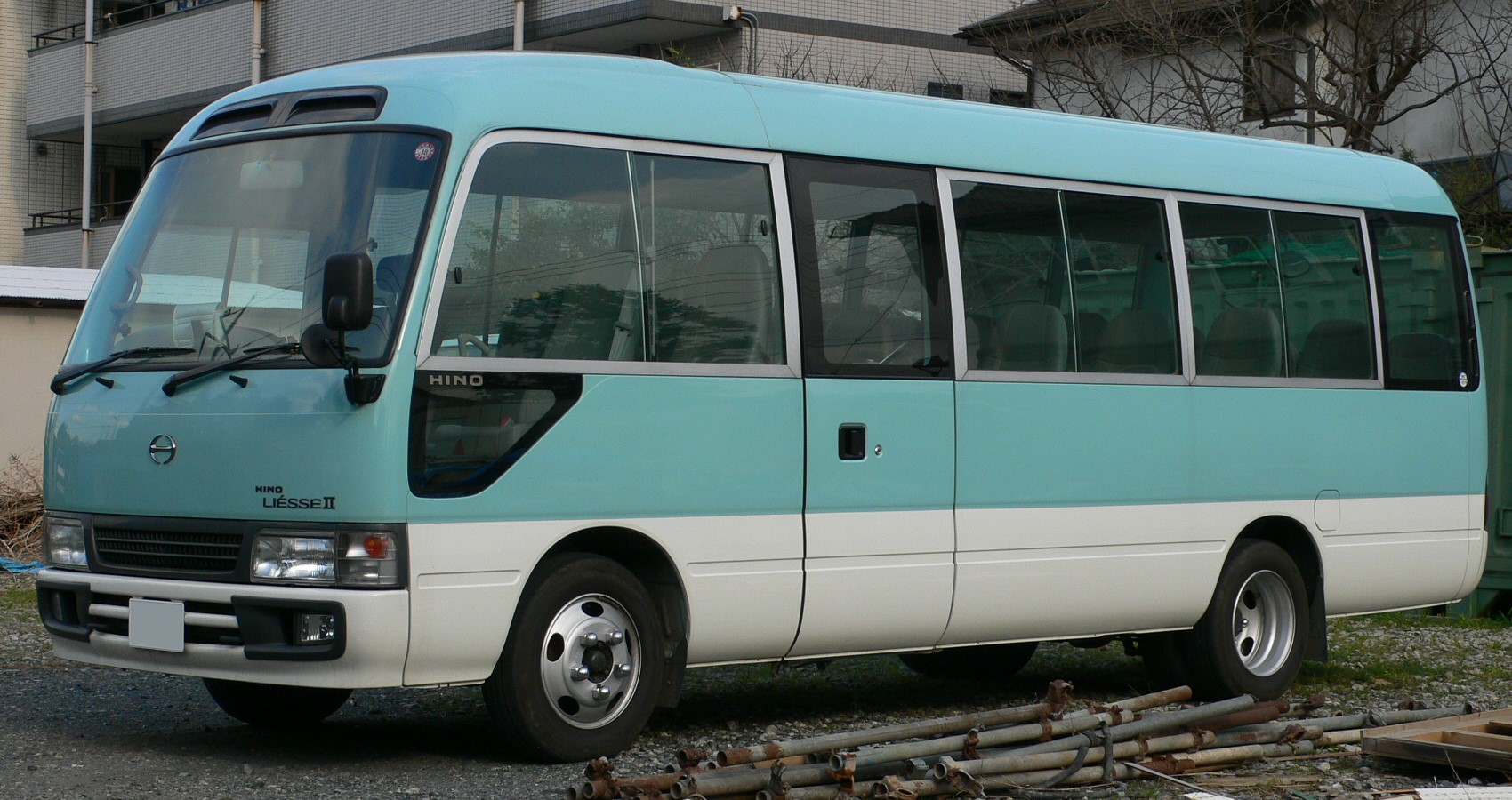
Liesse II long body high roof (KK-HZB50)

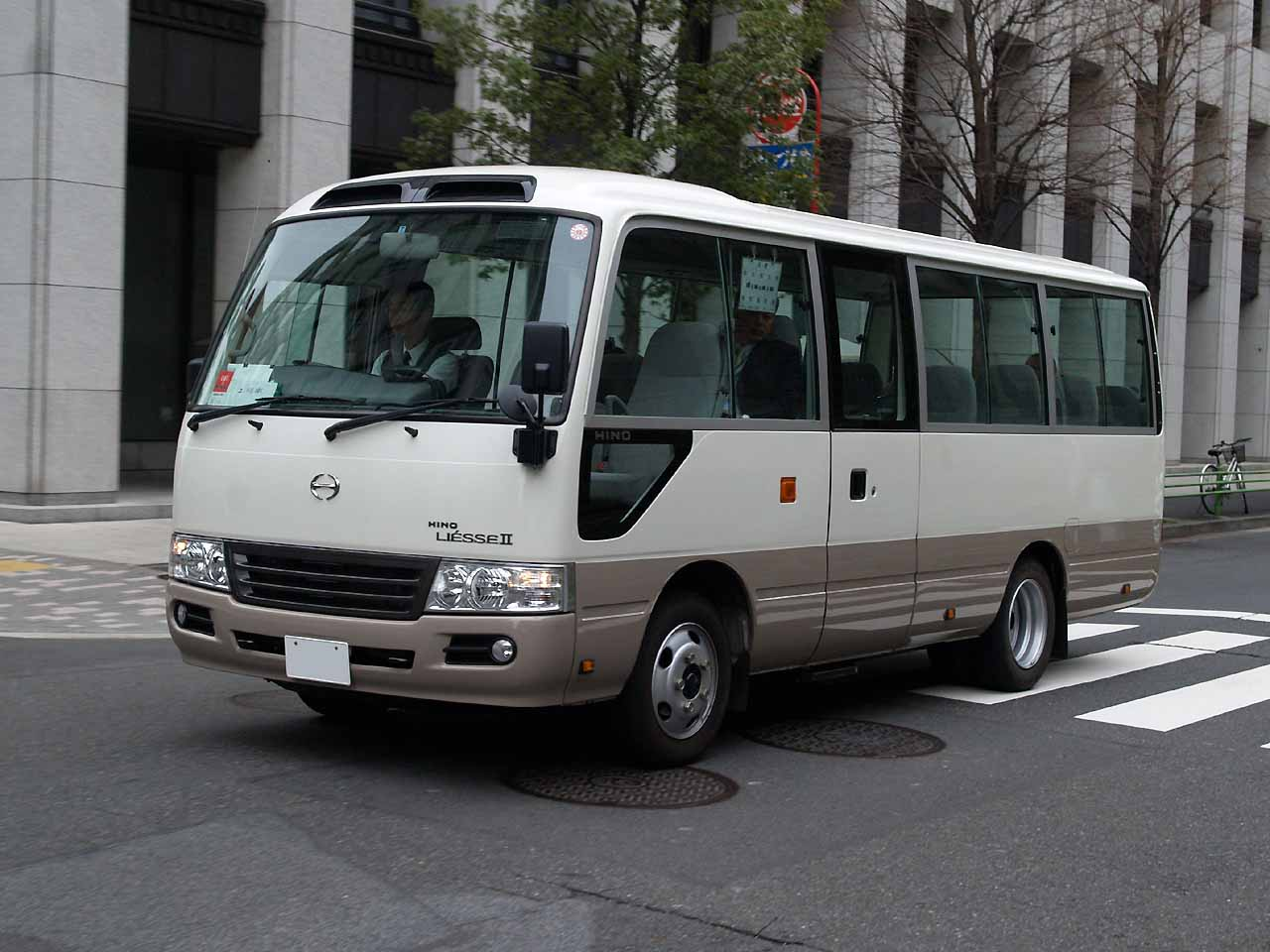
Facelift Liesse II short body standard roof (PDG-XZB40)

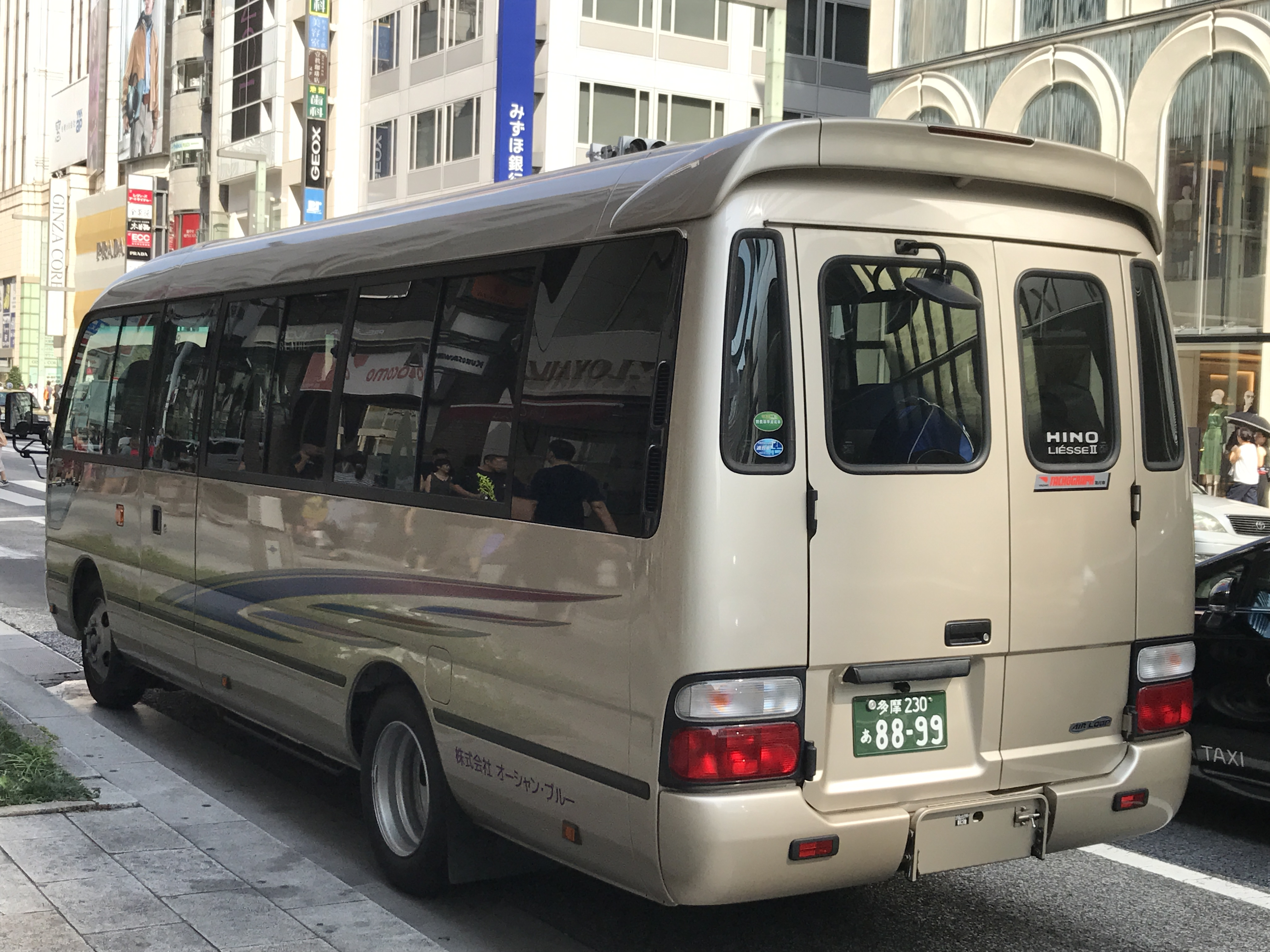
Liesse II long body high roof

=== Second Generation (2017) ===
- SDG/SKG-XZB70/70M (2017)
- GDB100/GDB110/GDB120 (2026)
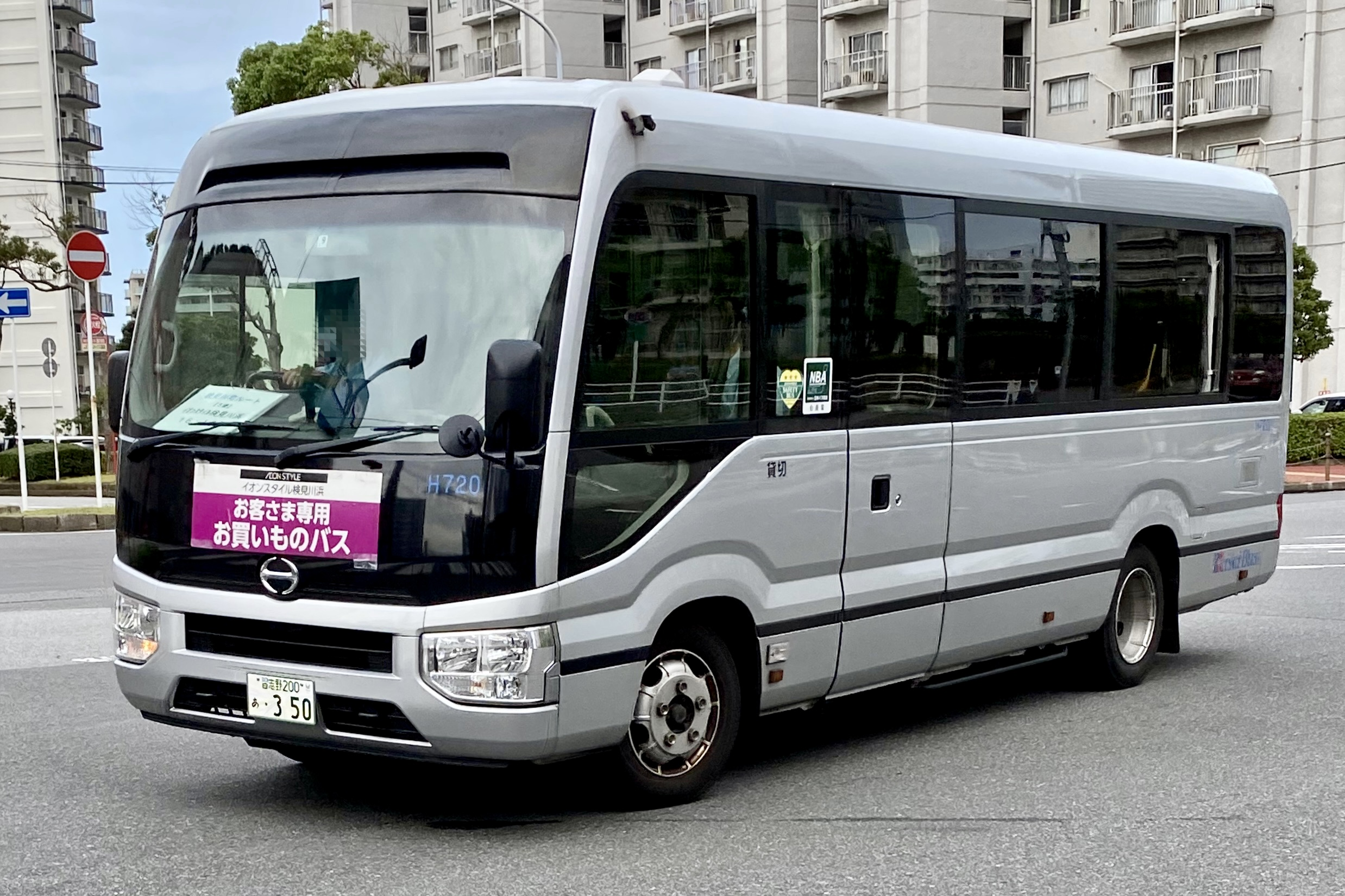
Hino Liesse II (XZB70)

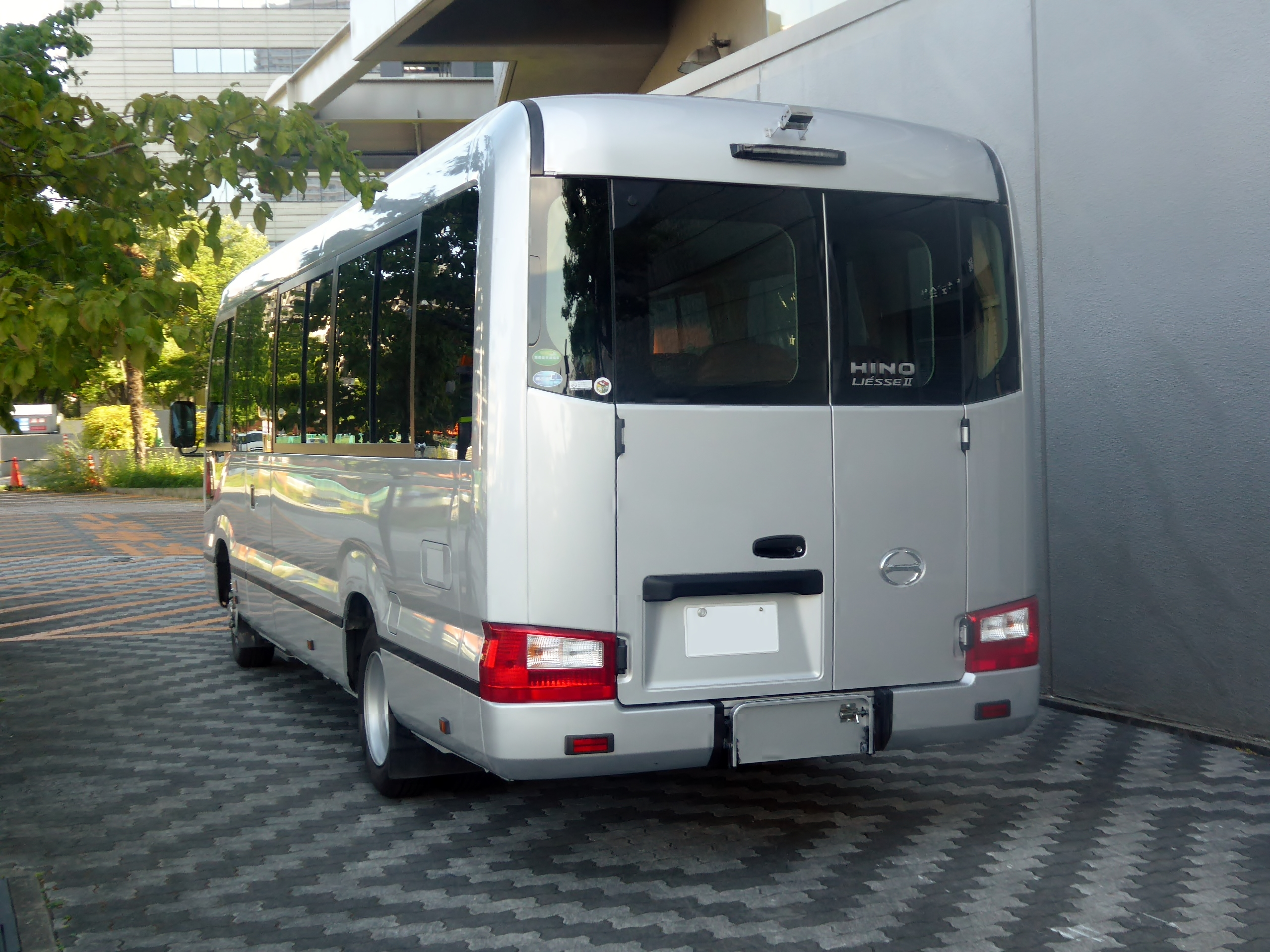
Hino Liesse II EX (SDG-XZB70)

== See also ==
- List of buses
