= Toyota H engine =

Overview
- Manufacturer: Toyota Motor Company
- Production: 1967-1990

Layout
- Configuration: Straight-6
- Displacement: 3.6 L (3,576 cc); 4.0 L (3,980 cc)
- Cylinder bore: 88 mm (3.46 in); 91 mm (3.58 in)
- Piston stroke: 98 mm (3.86 in); 102 mm (4.02 in)
- Cylinder block material: Cast iron
- Cylinder head material: Cast iron
- Valvetrain: OHV with 2 valves per cylinder
- Valvetrain drive system: Timing gears
- Compression ratio: 18.6:1-22.0:1

RPM range
- Idle speed: 650-750 rpm

Combustion
- Turbocharger: Toyota CT26 on 12H-T
- Fuel system: Mechanical fuel injection Direct injection
- Fuel type: Diesel
- Oil system: Wet sump
- Cooling system: Water-cooled

Output
- Power output: 91–136 PS (90–134 hp; 67–100 kW)
- Torque output: 204–315 N⋅m (21–32 kg⋅m; 150–232 lb⋅ft)

Chronology
- Predecessor: Toyota D engine
- Successor: Toyota HZ engine (for 2H)

The Toyota H engine was first produced in 1967 but did not reach road cars until 1972. The H engine was then replaced by the 2H engine and the 12H-T turbo engine. It was succeeded by the more advanced SOHC HZ series engine.

== H ==
The H is a 3.6 L (3,576 cc) inline 6, 12-valve OHV diesel engine. Bore is 88 mm and stroke is 98 mm, with a compression ratio of 21:1. Output is 91 to 95 PS (67 to 70 kW) at 3,600 rpm with 20.8 to 22.0 kg⋅m (204 to 216 N⋅m; 150 to 159 lb⋅ft) of torque at 2,200 rpm.

Applications

- Toyota Land Cruiser HJ45
- Toyota Dyna HU15 HU30
- Toyota Weapon carrier HQ15

== 2H ==
The 2H is a 4.0 L (3,980 cc) inline 6, 12 valve OHV indirect injection diesel engine. Bore is 91 mm and stroke is 102 mm, with a compression ratio of 20.7:1. Output is 105 PS (77 kW) at 3,500 rpm - later production years 107 hp (80 kW) with 177 lb·ft (240 N·m) of torque at 2,000 rpm. This engine weighs 330 kg (728 lb) in European trim from 1985. Compared to its predecessor, the 2H proved to be much more reliable.

Applications

- Toyota Land Cruiser HJ47, HJ60, HJ75
- Toyota Dyna HU20, 30, 40, 50
- Toyota Coaster HB20, 30

== 12H-T ==
The 12H-T is a 4.0 L (3,980 cc) inline 6, 12 valve OHV turbocharged direct injection diesel engine. Bore is 91 mm and stroke is 102 mm, with a compression ratio of 18.6:1. Output is 136 PS (100 kW; 134 hp) at 3500 rpm with 315 N⋅m (232 lb⋅ft) of torque at 1,800 rpm, on the stock configuration of 7 PSI of boost.

- Toyota Land Cruiser HJ61
- Toyota Coaster HB20, 30
