= Toyota HZ engine =

Type of engine made by Toyota

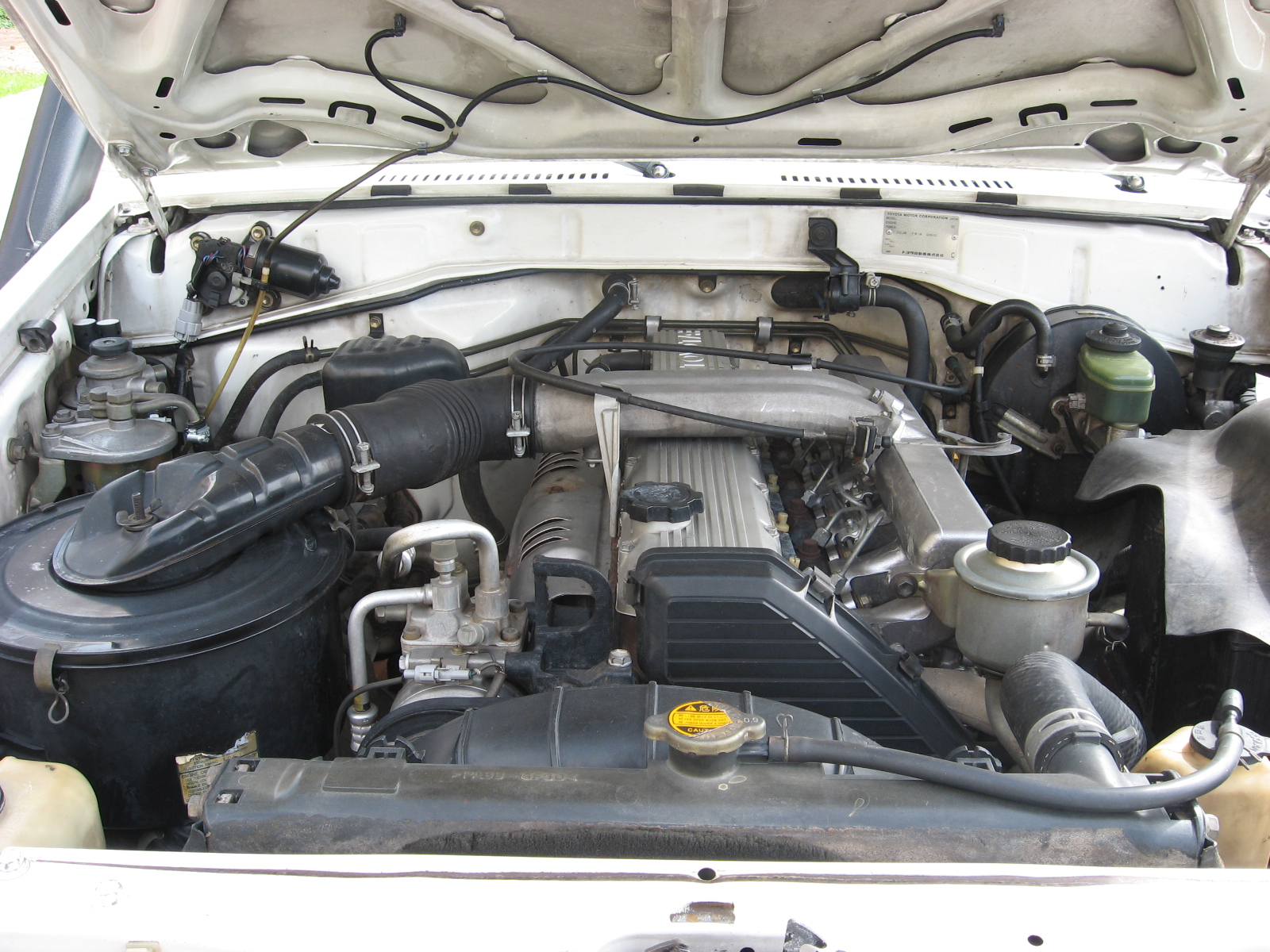
- A Toyota 1HZ engine installed in a Land Cruiser 70 Series.

Overview
- Manufacturer: Toyota
- Production: 1990–present

Layout
- Configuration: Straight-6
- Displacement: 4.2 L (4,164 cc)
- Cylinder bore: 94 mm (3.70 in)
- Piston stroke: 100 mm (3.94 in)
- Cylinder block material: Cast iron
- Cylinder head material: Cast iron
- Valvetrain: SOHC with 2 valves per cylinder
- Valvetrain drive system: Timing belt
- Compression ratio: 22.4:1

RPM range
- Max. engine speed: 4400

Combustion
- Fuel system: Mechanical fuel injection
- Fuel type: Diesel
- Oil system: Wet sump
- Cooling system: Water-cooled

Output
- Power output: 131 PS (129 hp; 96 kW)
- Torque output: 285 N⋅m (29 kg⋅m; 210 lb⋅ft)

Chronology
- Predecessor: Toyota H engine

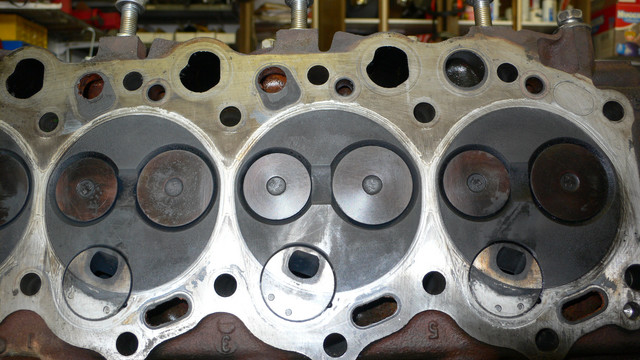
Bottom view of the 1HZ head

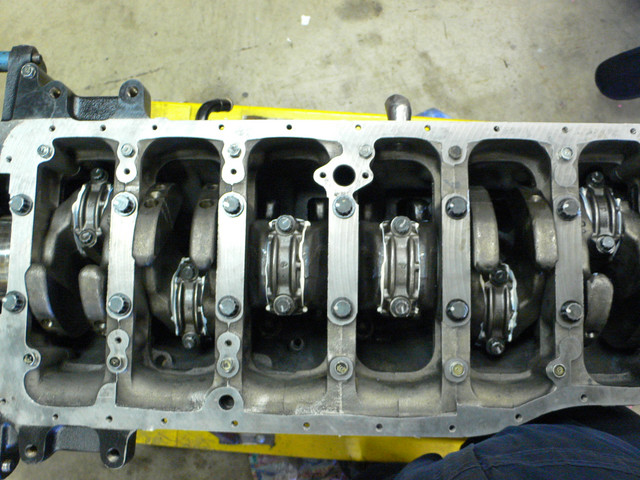
Bottom view of 1HZ/1HDT connecting rods and crank

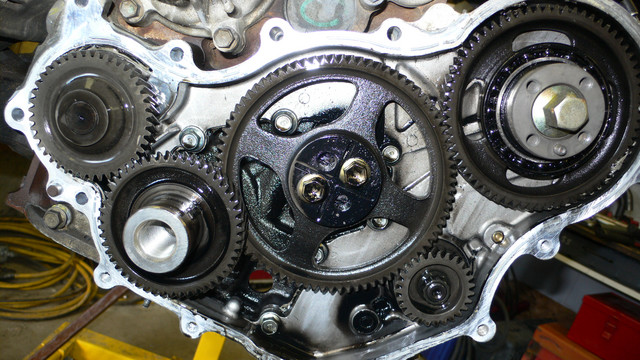
Front view of 1HZ/1HDT timing gears (1HZ uses a timing belt to drive the camshaft).

The Toyota 1HZ is a straight-six diesel engine developed and produced by Toyota beginning in 1990. It continues to be offered in the Toyota 70 series and Toyota Coaster sold in countries with low or no emissions regulations, and it is also in Landcruiser 70s sold by Toyota Gibraltar Stockholdings for organisations such as the United Nations and other NGOs. Formerly the engine was present in the Landcruiser 80 and Landcruiser 100 before being replaced.

The 1HZ generates more power and torque than the previous 2H diesel engine. Despite being 35 years old, the 1HZ still sees use in Land Cruiser J70 production worldwide with the exception of petrol-only markets, Euro 4, and Australian markets, where the 1GR-FE and 1GD-FTV Turbo-Diesel is supplied respectively. A popular engine in the 80 series Land Cruiser, it replaced the 2H engine in the 80/85 series in 1990.

The 1HZ Toyota Landcruiser 4.2 litre (4164 cc) diesel inline 6-cylinder 12-valve SOHC (single overhead camshaft) is an indirect injection design, and delivers maximum power of 96 kW (129 hp; 131 PS) at 3800 rpm and maximum torque of 285 N⋅m (210 lbf⋅ft) at 2200 rpm.

The 1HD is the turbocharged and direct injection version of this engine. It shares many of the same parts namely the engine block and crankshaft.

The 5-cylinder variant of this engine is known as 1PZ.

== See also ==
- Toyota KZ engine
- Toyota PZ engine
