= Toyota PZ engine =

Overview
- Manufacturer: Toyota
- Production: 1990-2001

Layout
- Configuration: Straight-five
- Displacement: 3.5 L (3,469 cc)
- Cylinder bore: 94 mm (3.70 in)
- Piston stroke: 100 mm (3.94 in)
- Cylinder block material: Cast iron
- Cylinder head material: Cast iron
- Valvetrain: SOHC, 2 valves per cylinder
- Valvetrain drive system: Timing belt
- Compression ratio: 22.7:1

RPM range
- Max. engine speed: 4000 rpm

Combustion
- Fuel system: Mechanical fuel injection
- Fuel type: Diesel
- Oil system: Wet sump
- Cooling system: Water-cooled

Output
- Power output: 116 PS (85 kW; 114 bhp)
- Torque output: 230 N⋅m (170 lb⋅ft)

The Toyota PZ engine (also called the 1PZ) is a 3.5 L (3,469 cc) inline-five 10-valve SOHC diesel engine built by Toyota from 1990 through 2001. Bore is 94 mm (3.7 in) and stroke is 100 mm (3.9 in), with a compression ratio of 22.7:1.

The engine's output is 116 PS (85 kW; 114 bhp) at 4000 rpm, with 230 N⋅m (170 lb⋅ft) of torque at 2600 rpm.

The 1PZ is a five-cylinder variant of the 1HZ engine and as such it shares many of its internals with that engine.

== Applications ==
- Toyota Land Cruiser 70 Series (PZJ70/73/75/77)
