= Toyota Mega Cruiser =

Full-size four-wheel-drive SUV

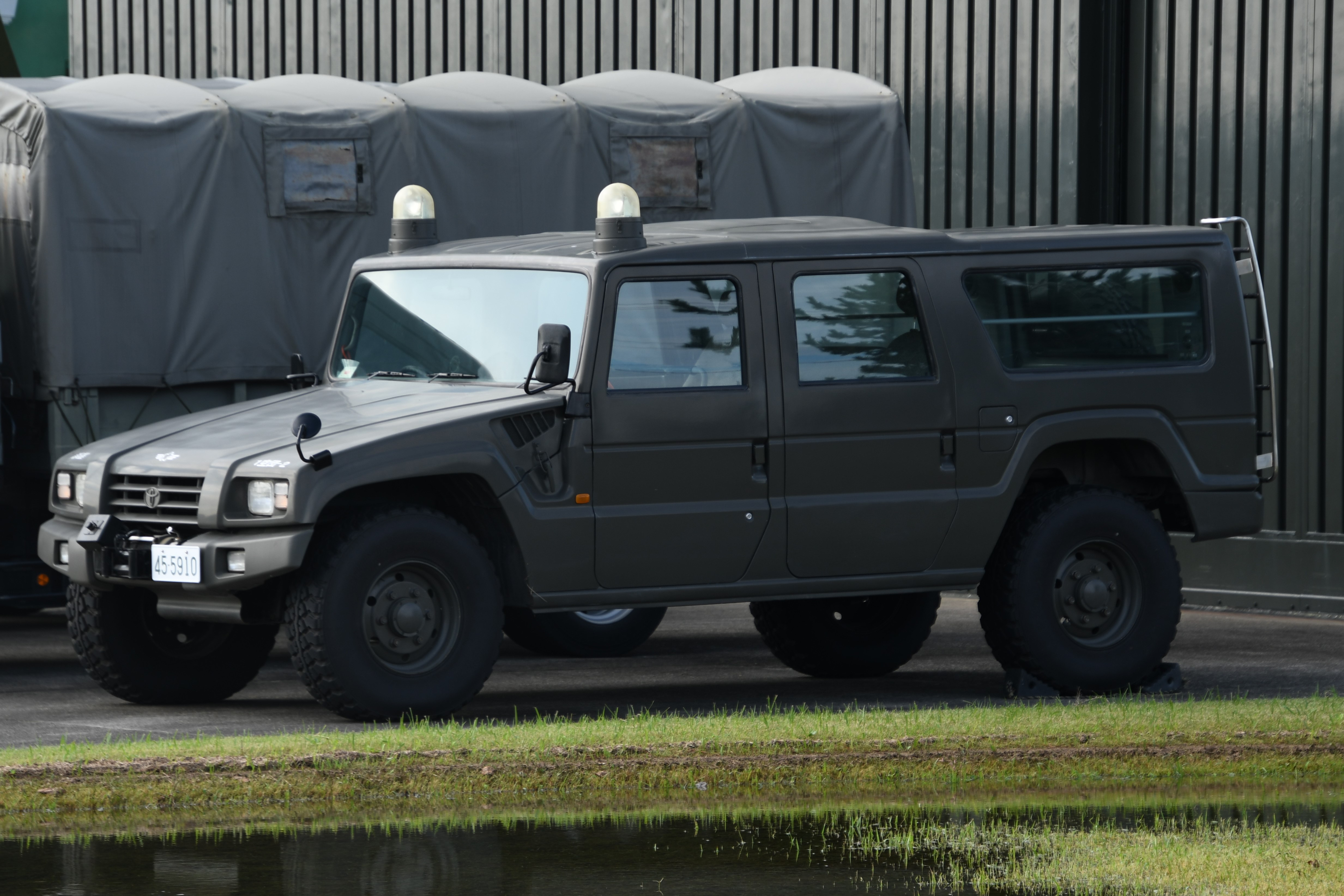
- A Toyota Mega Cruiser BXD20 used by the Japanese-Air Self Defense Forces at Hamamatsu Air Base.

Overview
- Manufacturer: Toyota
- Production: 1995–2001; 3,000 produced
- Assembly: Japan: Gifu (Gifu Auto Body)

Body and chassis
- Class: Full-size SUV
- Body style: 4-door SUV
- Layout: Front-engine, four-wheel-drive
- Chassis: Body-on-frame

Powertrain
- Engine: 4.1L 15B-FTE I4 (turbo-diesel)
- Transmission: 4-speed Aisin A443F automatic

Dimensions
- Wheelbase: 3,395 mm (133.7 in)
- Length: 5,090 mm (200.4 in)
- Width: 2,170 mm (85.4 in)
- Height: 2,075 mm (81.7 in)
- Curb weight: 2,850 kg (6,283 lb)

The Toyota Mega Cruiser (Japanese: トヨタ・メガクルーザー, Toyota Megakurūzā) is a large, heavy-duty four-wheel-drive SUV introduced by Toyota in 1995. It is the largest 4WD vehicle ever built by Toyota, and its design resembles that of the Humvee and Hummer H1.

Like the Humvee, the Mega Cruiser was originally designed primarily for military use with the vehicle seeing duty as a transport vehicle in the Japan Self Defense Forces (see ja:高機動車).

Sold exclusively in Japan via Toyota Store locations, the Mega Cruiser was also used by prefectural police, the Japan Automobile Federation and fire/rescue departments. As of 2020, it was reported that Toyota had produced 3,000 units before production was halted. A total of 133 Mega Cruisers were sold to civilians.

== History ==
A prototype of the Toyota Mega Cruiser was first presented to the public at the 30th Tokyo Motor Show in October 1993. Production began in late 1995 at Toyota's Gifu Auto Body subsidiary before sales began in 1996.

All Mega Cruiser production was reported to have been halted in 2001 while sales officially ended in 2002. The reason being slow sales due to strict vehicle taxes and Japan having a lot of narrow streets.

Some Mega Cruisers were sold overseas from Japan as grey imports.

== Development ==
The Mega Cruiser was designed as a 4-door full-size SUV and features a 4.1 L turbo diesel inline-4 engine. The engine was rated at 114 kW (153 hp) and 382 N⋅m (282 lb⋅ft) of torque at 1,800 rpm while also being very robust. A 4-speed Aisin-Warner automatic transmission with a two-speed transfer case transfers power to all four wheels.

Its wheelbase is 3,395 mm (134 in) and it is 5,090 mm (200 in) in length. The vehicle is 2,075 mm (82 in) high and 2,170 mm (85 in) wide. It has a load capacity of 600 kg and has a curb weight of 2,850 kg (6,283 lb). The SUV featured front, center, and rear differential locks, as well as four wheel steering. It has a central tire pressure system installed as an optional feature and has a hardtop roof. The Mega Cruiser has seats for two people in front and four people at the back.

The vehicle was intended to test designs that would eventually make their way into mass-produced Toyota SUVs, such as the Land Cruiser, but was financially unsuccessful for Toyota.

While the Mega Cruiser was produced by Toyota in RHD configuration, a few were reported to be made in LHD configuration. As of 2020, around 12 were known to have been produced in LHD.

== Variants ==
=== Mega Cruiser (BXD10) ===
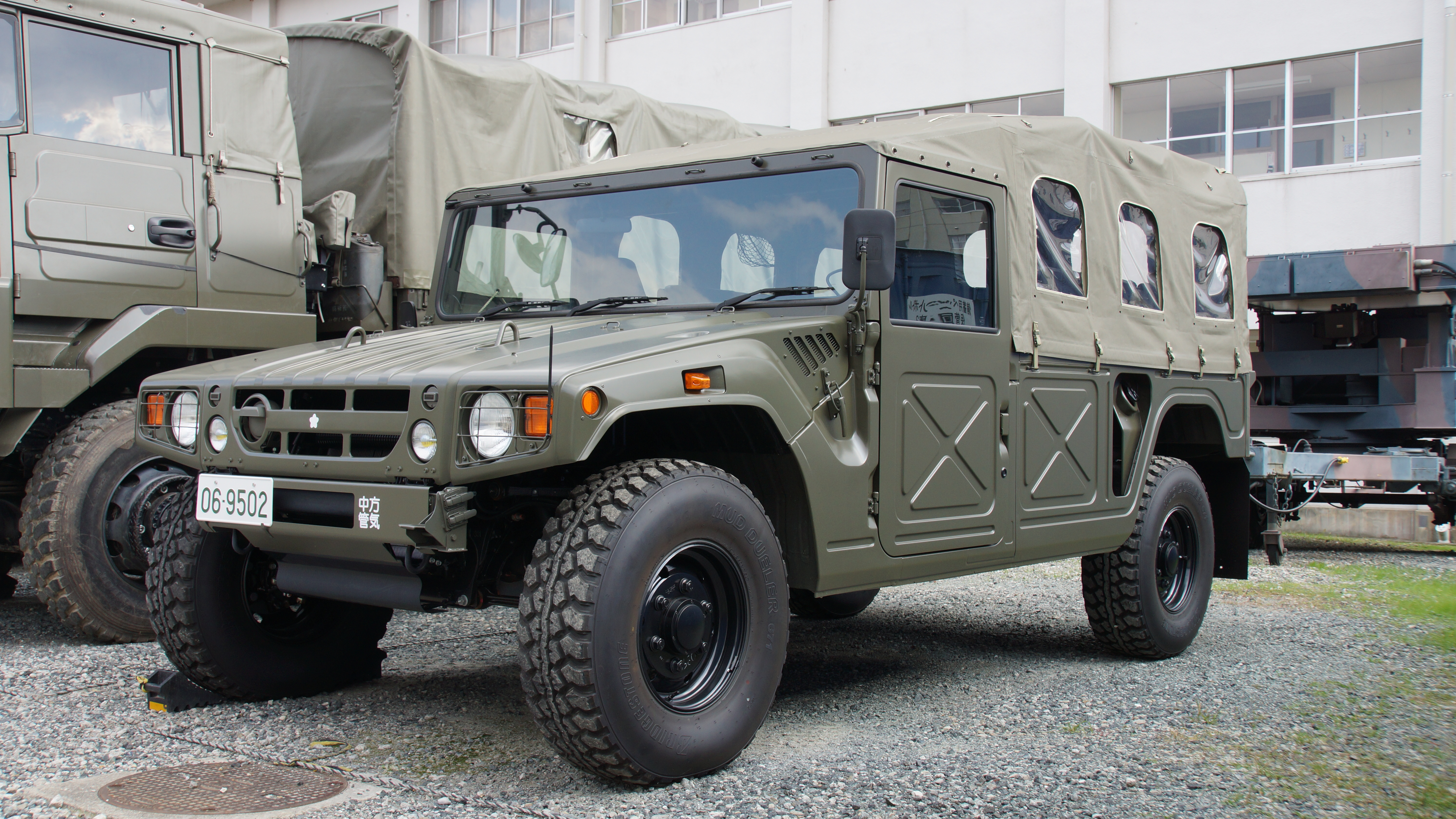
Toyota Mega Cruiser (BXD10)

The BXD10 version was made for military purposes such as personnel and military equipment transportation. In JSDF service it was called High Mobility Vehicle, or HMV.

=== Missile launcher (BXD10) ===
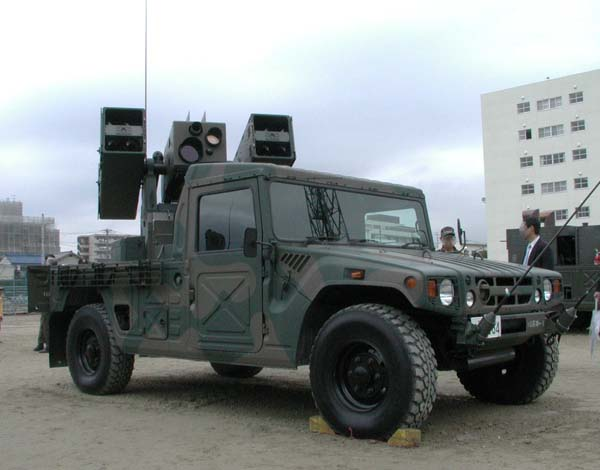
Missile launcher variant

A modified BXD10 mounting the Type 93 Surface-to-air missile, produced by Toshiba Heavy Industries.

=== Mega Cruiser (BXD20) ===
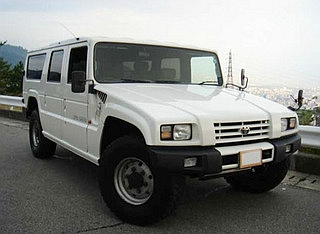
Toyota Mega Cruiser BXD20

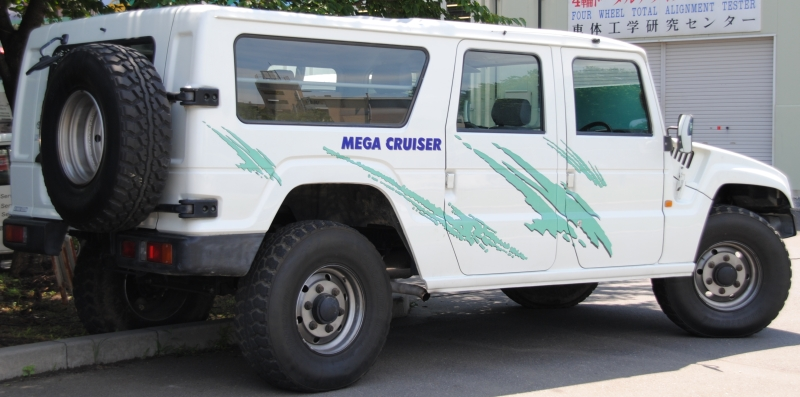
Toyota Mega Cruiser BXD20 rear view

The BXD20 version was made for civilian sales and was available with two roof types, the standard low roof and the optional high roof. Some BXD20 versions also saw service as military vehicles while others were used by prefectural police/fire departments and the Japanese Armed Forces.

== Operators ==
- Japan
- Ukraine - 30 Mega Cruiser HMVs were shipped to Ukraine in 2026 as part of a donation of ground vehicles by the JSDF.
