= Toyota GD engine =

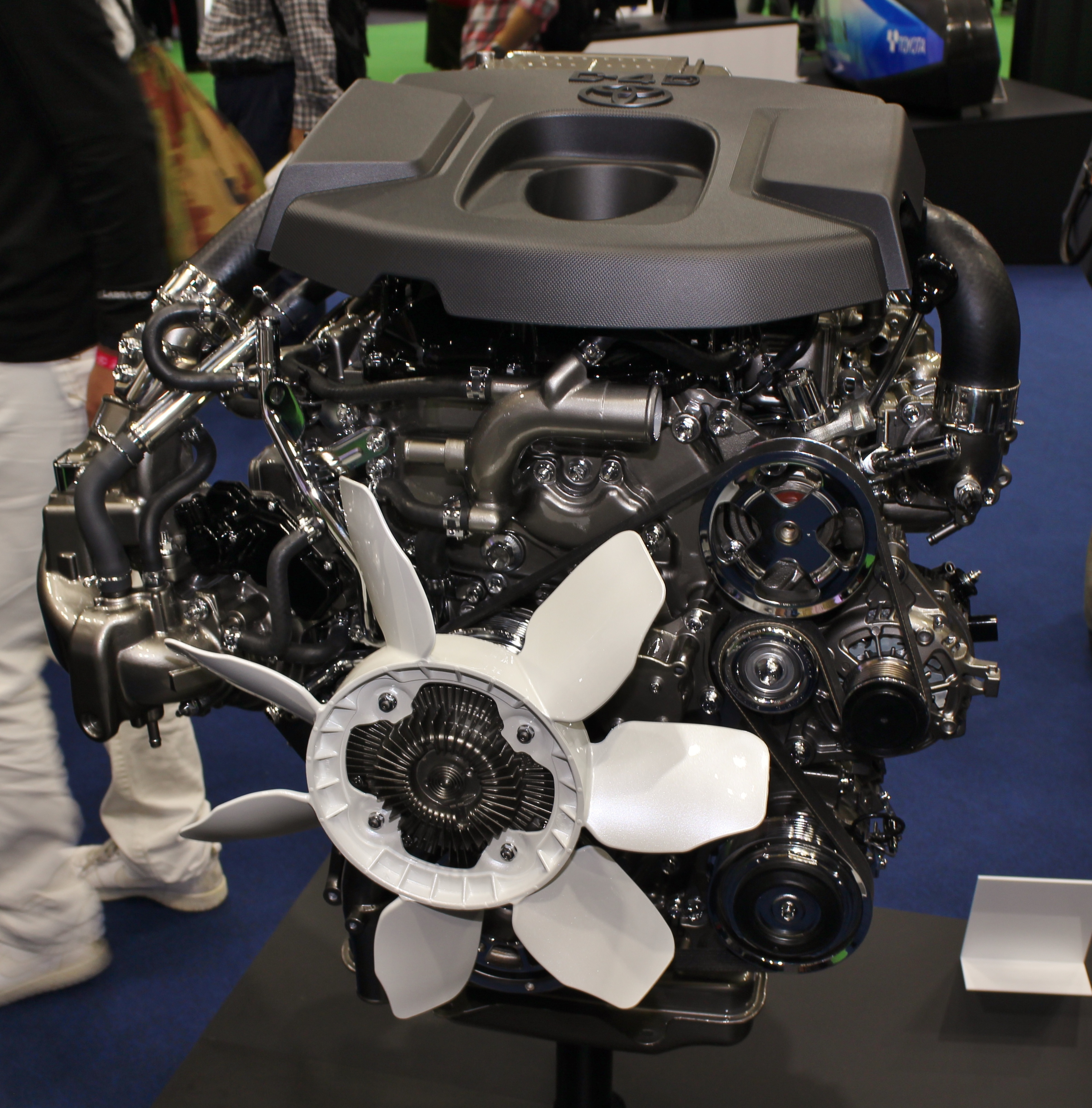
- 1GD-FTV engine

Overview
- Manufacturer: Toyota
- Production: 2015–present

Layout
- Configuration: Straight-4
- Valvetrain: DOHC 4 valves x cyl.

RPM range
- Max. engine speed: 4600

Combustion
- Turbocharger: Variable nozzle with Intercooler
- Fuel system: Common rail Direct injection
- Fuel type: Diesel
- Cooling system: Water-cooled

Output
- Power output: 150–253 PS (148–250 hp; 110–186 kW)
- Torque output: 300–550 N⋅m (221–406 lb⋅ft; 31–56 kg⋅m)

Chronology
- Predecessor: Toyota KD engine

The Toyota GD engine series is a diesel engine produced by Toyota which appeared in 2015. It replaced the Toyota KD engine series as a diesel engine series mainly oriented to body-on-frame vehicles. The GD engine featured Economy with Superior Thermal Efficient Combustion (ESTEC) technology. Toyota claims they have a maximum thermal efficiency of 44 percent, "top class" at the time of introduction.

The GD engine series is produced in three countries: in Japan, in Bangalore, India by Toyota Industries Engine India (TIEI), and in Chonburi, Thailand by Siam Toyota Manufacturing (STM).

== 1GD-FTV ==
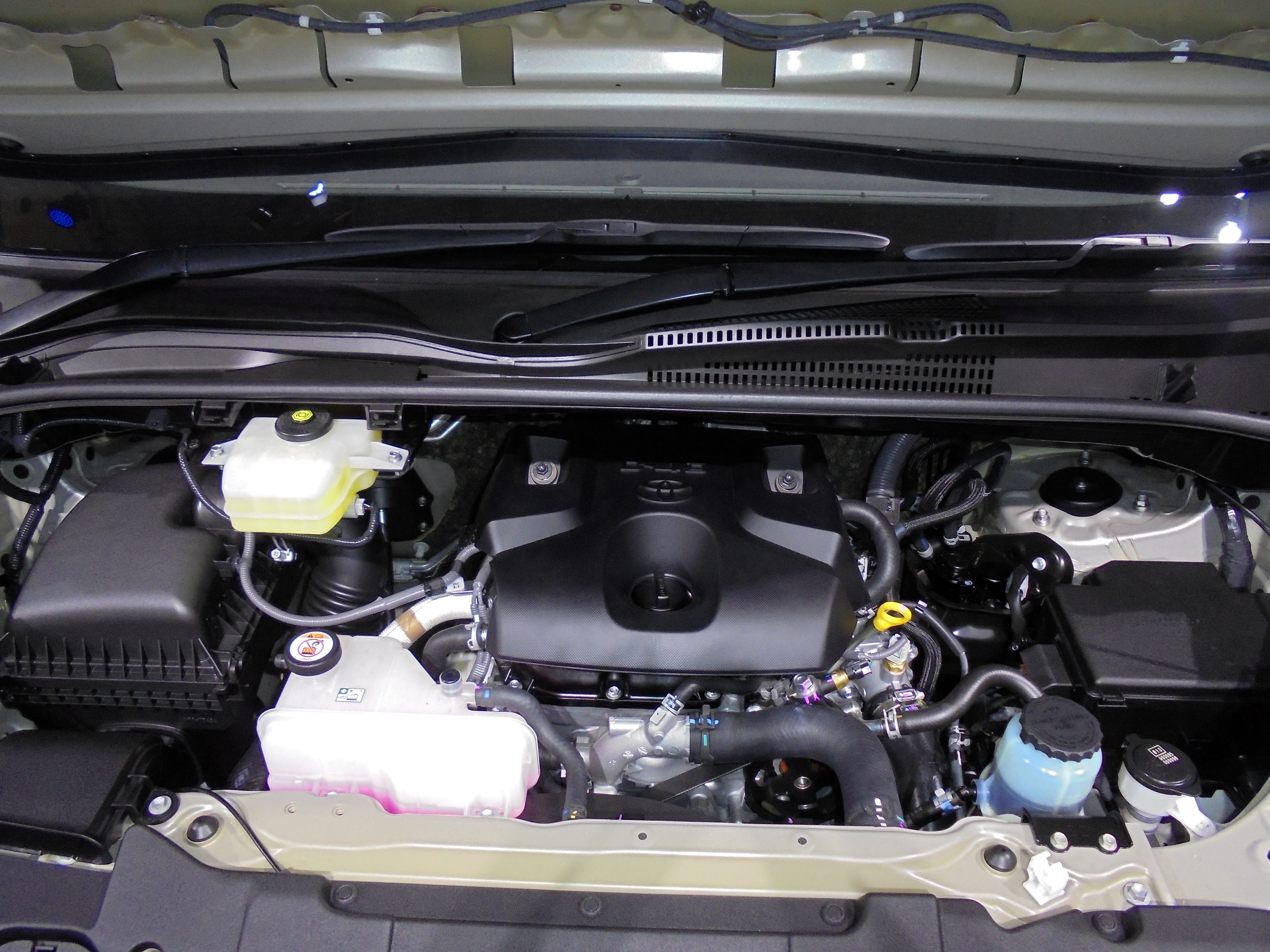
1GD-FTV

The 1GD-FTV is a 2,755 cc (2.8 L) straight-4 common rail diesel engine with a variable nozzle turbocharger (VNT), chain drive and Intercooler. It has 16 valves and a DOHC (double overhead camshaft) design. Its compression ratio is 15.6:1. Bore x stroke is 92 mm × 103.6 mm (3.62 in × 4.08 in). Initially, it generates 180 PS (178 hp; 132 kW) at 3,400 rpm, and 450 N⋅m (332 lb⋅ft; 46 kg⋅m) of torque at 1,600-2,400 rpm when mated to a 6-speed automatic transmission; 177 PS (175 hp; 130 kW) and 420 N⋅m (310 lb⋅ft; 43 kg⋅m) when mated to a Manual transmission. In 2020, the power and torque figures for some models were upgraded to 150 kW (201 hp; 204 PS) at 3,400 rpm, both for manual and automatic transmissions and 500 N⋅m (370 lb⋅ft; 51 kg⋅m) at 1,600–2,800 rpm for automatic transmission only. The manual transmission retained the earlier 420 N⋅m (310 lb⋅ft; 43 kg⋅m) of torque. Average fuel consumption (in JC08 method) is 11.2 km/L (8.9 L/100 km; 26 mpg_{‑US}).

For the Toyota HiAce (H200), the engine is detuned to 150 PS (148 hp; 110 kW) at 3600 rpm and 300 N⋅m (221 lb⋅ft; 31 kg⋅m) of torque at 1000-3400 rpm mated to a 6-speed automatic transmission.

For the 2nd Generation Toyota Innova, the engine was also detuned to meet the intended specifications. The automatic transmission variant generates 174 PS (172 hp; 128 kW) at 3400 rpm and 360 N⋅m (266 lb⋅ft; 37 kg⋅m) of torque at 1200-3400 rpm. The 5 & 6-speed manual transmission variant generates 170 PS (168 hp; 125 kW) at 3600 rpm and 343 N⋅m (253 lb⋅ft; 35 kg⋅m) of torque at 1200-3400 rpm.

Meanwhile for the Hilux and Fortuner GR-S & GR Sport models, the engine is further uprated to produce 165 kW (221 hp; 224 PS) and 550 N⋅m (410 lb⋅ft; 56 kg⋅m) of torque.

For the Toyota Dyna and Hino Dutro (Hino 200 for the foreign versions), the engine is detuned to 106 kW (142 hp; 144 PS).

A 48-volt mild hybrid variation was introduced in August 2023.

For marine application (Yanmar 4LV), the engine generates up to 250 hp (253 PS; 186 kW) at 3800 rpm.

=== Applications ===
- Hino Dutro 1.5-tonne class/200
- Toyota Coaster / Hino Liesse II (2022–2026)
- Toyota Dyna
- Toyota HiAce (H200) (2018–present)
- Toyota HiAce (H300) (2019–present)
- Toyota Hilux (AN120/AN130) (2015–present, mild hybrid optional)
- Toyota Hilux (AN220/AN230) (2025–present, mild hybrid optional)
- Toyota Innova (AN140) (2016–present)
- Toyota Land Cruiser Prado (J150) (2015–2023)
- Toyota Fortuner (AN150) (2015–present, mild hybrid optional)
- Toyota GranAce/Majesty (H300) (2019–present)
- Toyota Land Cruiser (J70) (2023–present)
- Toyota Land Cruiser Prado (J250) (2023–present, mild hybrid optional)
- Yanmar 4LV (marinized version of 1GD-FTV)
- Thairung Transformer II

== 2GD-FTV ==
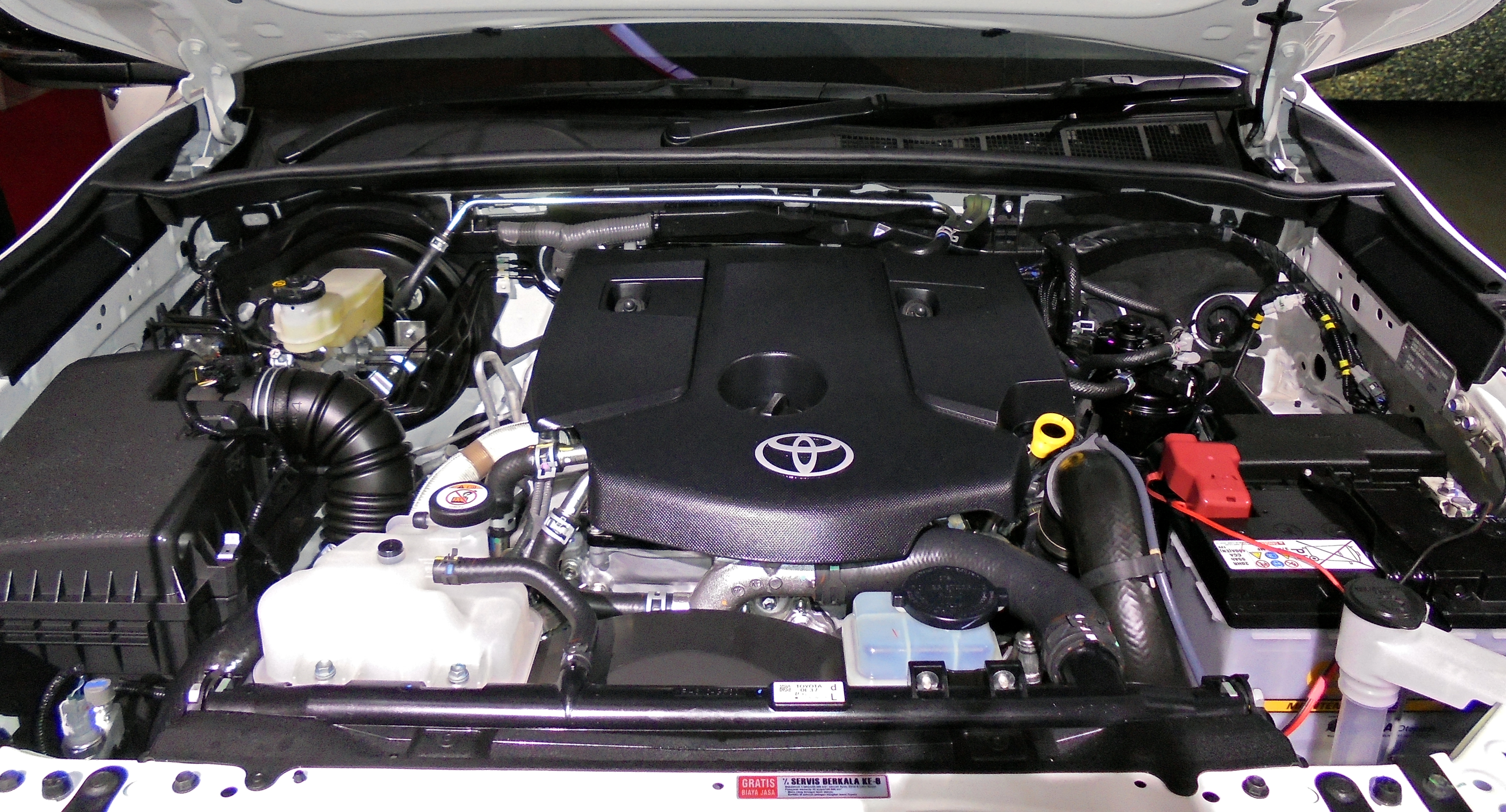
2GD-FTV

The 2GD-FTV is a 2,393 cc (2.4 L) straight-four common rail diesel engine with a variable nozzle turbocharger (VNT) and intercooler. It has 16 valves and a DOHC (double overhead camshaft) design. Its compression ratio is 15.6:1. Bore x stroke is 92 mm × 90 mm (3.62 in × 3.54 in). It generates 150 PS (148 hp; 110 kW) with intercooler at 3400 rpm, and 400 N⋅m (295 lb⋅ft; 41 kg⋅m) of torque at 1600-2000 rpm when mated to 6-speed automatic transmission or manual transmission, depending on target market and emission specifications.

In the second generation Toyota Innova, it generates 149 PS (110 kW; 147 hp) at 3400 rpm, and 36.7 kg⋅m (360 N⋅m; 265 lb⋅ft) of torque at 1200-2600 rpm when mated to a 6-speed automatic transmission, depending on target market and emission specifications. With manual transmission, outputs are 149 PS (110 kW; 147 hp) and 34.9 kg⋅m (342 N⋅m; 252 lb⋅ft)

=== Applications ===
- Toyota Hilux (AN120/AN130) (2015–present)
- Toyota Innova (AN140) (2015–present)
- Toyota Fortuner (AN150) (2015–present)
- Toyota Hilux Champ (AN120) (2023–present)

== 3GD-FTV ==
The 3GD-FTV is a 2,999 cc (3.0 L) straight-four common rail diesel engine with a variable nozzle turbocharger (VNT) and intercooler. It has 16 valves and a DOHC (double overhead camshaft) design. Its compression ratio is 16.3:1. Bore x stroke is 92 mm × 112.8 mm (3.62 in × 4.44 in). It generates 144–167 PS (142–165 hp; 106–123 kW) and 300–452 N⋅m (221–333 lb⋅ft; 31–46 kg⋅m) of torque.

=== Applications ===
- Toyota Dyna / Hino Dutro (GDY232/GDY282, 2026–present)
- Toyota Coaster / Hino Liesse II (GDB100/GDB110/GDB120, 2026–present)

== See also ==
- List of Toyota engines
- Toyota KD engine
