= Toyota Motor East Japan =

Japanese subsidiary company

Toyota Motor East Japan, Inc.
- Trade name: Toyota Motor East Japan
- Native name: トヨタ自動車東日本株式会社
- Romanized name: Toyota Jidōsha Higashi Nihon Kabushiki-gaisha
- Company type: Subsidiary
- Industry: Automotive
- Predecessors: Central Motors; Kanto Auto Works; Toyota Motors Tohoku
- Founded: 1 July 2012; 13 years ago
- Headquarters: Ōhira, Miyagi, Japan
- Key people: Hiroyuki Ishikawa (President)
- Products: Cars, engines, auto parts
- Production output: About 400,000 vehicles (FY2021)
- Revenue: ▲¥760.02 billion (FY2022)
- Operating income: ▲¥6.54 billion (FY2022)
- Net income: ▲¥8.16 billion (FY2022)
- Total assets: ▲¥247.72 billion (FY2022)
- Total equity: ▼¥109.49 billion (FY2022)
- Number of employees: About 7,500 (2016)
- Parent: Toyota Motor Corporation
- Website: www.toyota-ej.co.jp/english
- Footnotes / references: Fiscal Year 2021 (FY2021) is from 1 April 2021 to 31 March 2022.; Fiscal Year 2022 (FY2022) is from 1 April 2022 to 31 March 2023.; References

Toyota Motor East Japan is a manufacturing subsidiary of the Toyota group based in Japan. It was founded in July 2012 by the merger of Central Motors, Kanto Auto Works and Toyota Motors Tohoku.

== History ==
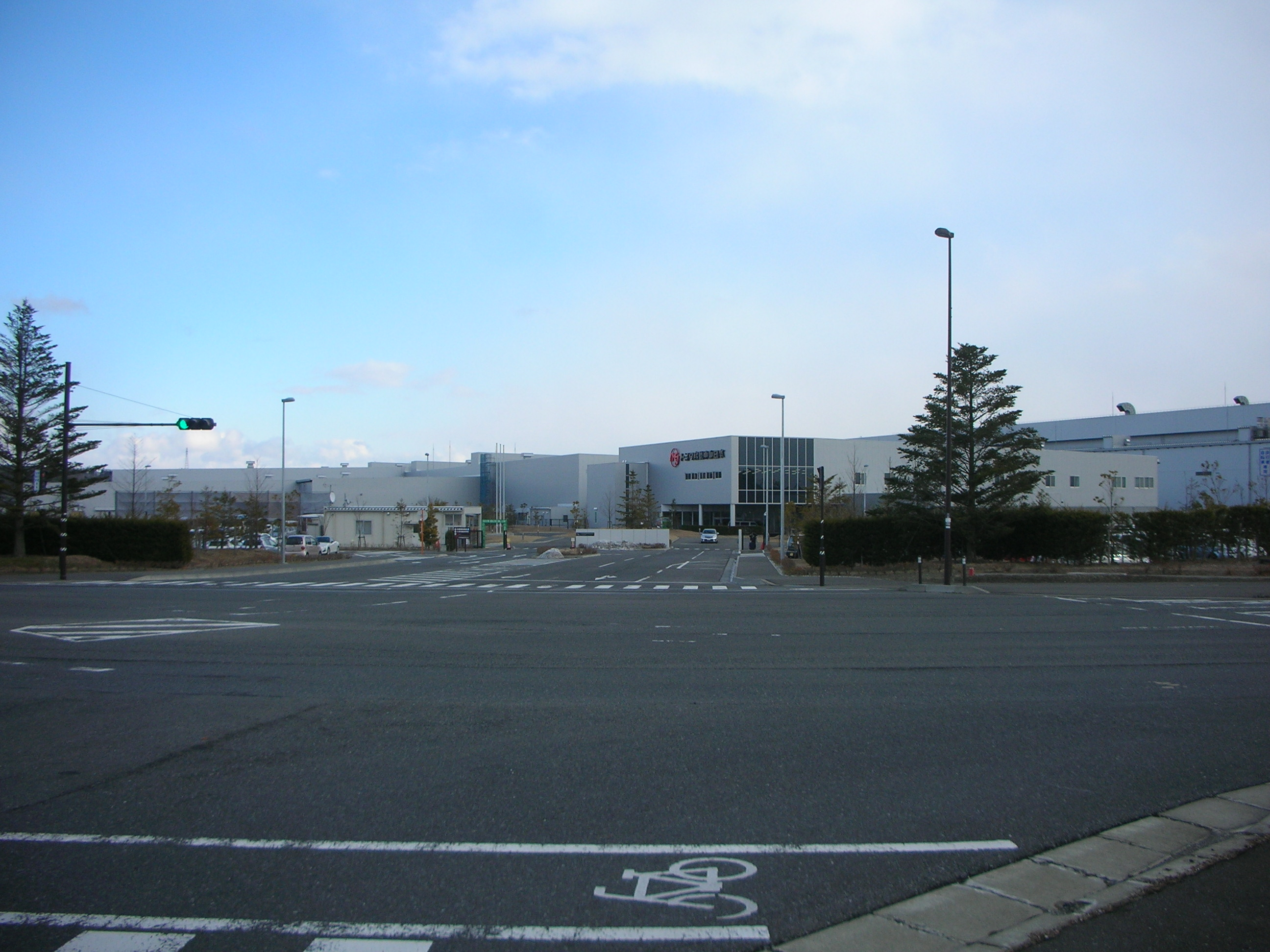
Headquarters in Miyagi, Japan

Following the Tōhoku earthquake, the President of Toyota, Akio Toyoda, announced a reorganisation of the operations for the area, naming it the third production centre after Chubu and Kyushu. On 1 July 2012, Toyota Motors Tohoku, Kanto Auto Works and Central Motors were merged to form Toyota Motor East Japan. The new company focused on developing and manufacturing compact cars, engines and other components.

In August 2012, Toyota Motor East Japan's Higashi-Fuji plant started the production of the second-generation Porte and the Spade, replacing Daihatsu which had assembled the first-generation Porte at its Kyoto plant. In November 2015, Toyota started the process of moving the production of the Vitz from Toyota Industries to Toyota Motor East Japan's Iwate plant with the aim of consolidating compact/subcompact car assembly in the Northeast and reducing costs. The move was completed in October 2018. Toyota also announced it plans to eventually transfer all the Corolla production from Toyota Motor East Japan to its Takaoka plant.

Toyota Motor East Japan began manufacturing the second generation Sienta during 2015, replacing Daihatsu as the assembler of that model for Japan. In December 2016, the company started production of the C-HR at its Iwate plant. In November 2017, it started the production of a new version of the JPN Taxi (taxicab for Japan), which replaced the Toyota Comfort previously manufactured at the Higashi-Fuji plant since 1995. The new JPN Taxi is based on the 2nd generation Sienta and was initially assembled at the same location as its predecessor. A full deployment of the new model was expected before the 2020 Olympics. Production of the second-generation Century, a model also assembled at Higashi-Fuji, stopped in January 2017. In 2018, Higashi-Fuji started to manufacture the third-generation Century.

In June 2018, Toyota Motor East Japan announced plans to relocate production and employees through its plants within the year. Later, the company also said it would close the Higashi-Fuji plant by 2020 and relocate production of the JPN Taxi and Porte to its Iwate and Miyagi plants. Other models would be transferred to different subsidiaries of the Toyota group. The Higashi-Fuji Technical Centre would continue in operation.

In February 2020, the company started deliveries of the Yaris assembled at its Iwate plant, replacing the Vitz nameplate. In August 2020, Toyota Motor East Japan started assembling the Yaris Cross at Miyagi and announced it would also be produced from October at Iwate. On 10 December 2020, the Higashi-Fuji plant ended car assembly. The Porte and Spade were finally discontinued, the JPN Taxi was moved to the Miyagi plant, and the Century to Toyota's Motomachi plant. The Higashi-Fuji plant was closed down at the end of the month.

By 2020, as the profitability of small cars was low for Toyota and specifically for Toyota Motor East Japan when compared to Daihatsu, with longer development times and bigger production costs, Toyota Motor East Japan send workers to Daihatsu for two years to learn the systems of the sister company. The learned methods were introduced to Toyota Motor East Japan from late 2022.

At the end of July 2021, the company started assembling the second-generation Aqua at its Iwate plant. The first-generation Aqua was produced by the Iwate plant since before the establishment of Toyota Motor East Japan. In September 2022, the third-generation Sienta started to roll off at Miyagi.

In June 2023, Toyota Motor East Japan said it would start assembling the Lexus LBX at the Iwate plant, the company's first Lexus-badged vehicle. C-HR's production ended by July. Production of the new model started in December of that year.

== Facilities ==
The company has plants for assembly at Miyagi (Ohira) and Iwate (Kanegasaki, Iwate). There are two overseas bases, one in Brazil and other in Thailand. The head offices are in Miyagi.

== Products ==
As of January 2021, Toyota cars produced by Toyota Motor East Japan include: the Sienta, the Corolla, the JPN Taxi, the Yaris Cross (Miyagi); the Aqua, the C-HR, the Yaris, the Yaris Cross (Iwate). The company also produces engines and other auto parts, wheelchairs and car lifters.

=== Miyagi Ohira plant ===
- Toyota Sienta
- Toyota Corolla Axio
- Toyota Corolla Fielder
- Toyota JPN Taxi
- Toyota Corolla Cross

=== Iwate plant ===
- Toyota Aqua
- Toyota Yaris
- Toyota Yaris Cross
- Lexus LBX

== Baseball team ==
Toyota Motor East Japan has a namesake baseball company team established in April 2012 (as the Kanto Auto Works team) and participating in semi-professional championships. In 2018, it entered for the first time to the main competition of the national Intercity baseball tournament.
