= Kanto Auto Works =

Japanese car manufacturer

Kanto Auto Works Co., Ltd.
- Native name: 関東自動車工業株式会社 (Kantō jidōsha kōgyō kabushiki gaisha)
- Type: Subsidiary
- Industry: Automotive
- Founded: April 25, 1946
- Defunct: July 1, 2012
- Successor: Toyota Motor East Japan
- Headquarters: 237-8585, Taura minato-cho, Yokosuka, Kanagawa Prefecture, Japan
- Revenue: ▲¥504,127 million (March 2011)
- Net income: ▲¥−1,965 million (March 2011)
- Parent: Toyota
- Website: www.kanto-aw.co.jp/en

Kanto Auto Works (Japanese: 関東自動車工業, Hepburn: Kantō jidōsha kōgyō) was a Japanese car manufacturer. It was a member of the Toyota Group. In July 2012, Kanto Auto Works and two other Toyota subsidiaries were merged to form Toyota Motor East Japan.

== History ==
In April 1946, Kanto Auto Works was established in Yokosuka, Kanagawa Prefecture, Japan, as an independent company known as Kanto Electric Motor Works which focused on repairing cars, assembling electric vehicles and producing bus bodies. In early 1948, it became a Toyota contractor, producing auto bodies. During its early years, the company also assembled cars for Toyota (Toyota SB, Toyota Master, Toyota Crown). The company also diversified into other products such as yachts and prefabricated homes. In 1950, it adopted the Kanto Auto Works name. In 1960, the company became a permanent car assembler through a new Yokosuka plant. Later, the company replaced Yokosuka for car assembly with the Higashi-Fuji (established in 1968) and Iwate (established in 1993) plants.

Kanto Auto Works was a public company until the 2011 Tōhoku earthquake, Toyota announced it would make it a wholly owned subsidiary. On July 1, 2012, Kanto Auto Works and two other Toyota subsidiaries (Central Motors and Toyota Motors Tohoku) were combined into a single company called Toyota Motor East Japan, Inc.

== Facilities ==
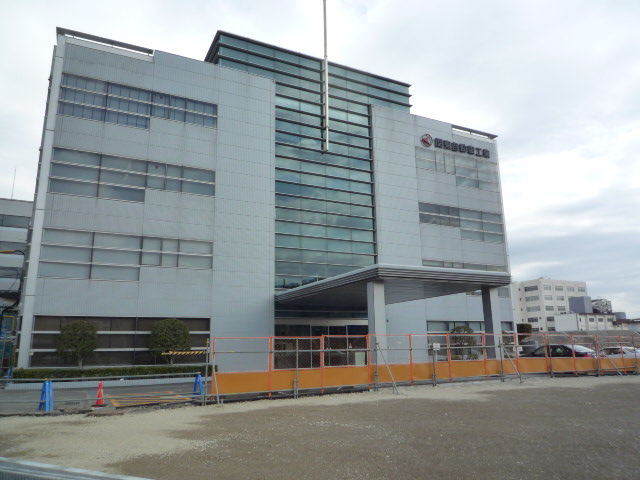
Former Kanto Auto Works headquarters, pictured in 2010

- Head Office, Kanagawa, Yokosuka
- Higashi Fuji Research and Development Center, Susono, Shizuoka Prefecture
- Higashi Fuji Manufacturing Plant, 1200 Onyado Susono, Shizuoka Prefecture
- Iwate Manufacturing Plant, Kanegasaki, Iwate Prefecture
- Fujiko Manufacturing Plant, Susono, Shizuoka Prefecture
