= Toyota Motors Tohoku =

Auto parts manufacturing subcontractor

Toyota Motors Tohoku was an auto parts manufacturing subcontractor under the Toyota Group. The company was created in July 1997 in Taiwa, Miyagi, Japan.

On July 1, 2012, three Toyota subcontractors Central Motors, Toyota Motors Tohoku, and Kanto Auto Works assumed operations as a combined company, with all manufacturing facilities and assets of the three former companies to now be known as Toyota Motor East Japan, Inc.

== Timeline ==
- 1997 Company formally created in July.
- 1998, July – start of operations.
- 1999 ISO 14 001 certification awarded.
- 2011 July Central Motor, Kanto Auto Works to begin talks with management integration.
- 2011 October announced that it has appointed a new president and a new name as Toyota Motor East Japan, Inc..
