= Central Motors =

Car manufacturer

Central Motor Co., Ltd.
- Native name: セントラル自動車株式会社
- Company type: Limited company
- Industry: Automotive industry
- Predecessor: Toyota's Kamata Plant business
- Founded: 4 September 1950
- Founder: Ryuichi Tomiya
- Defunct: 1 July 2012
- Successor: Toyota Motor East Japan
- Headquarters: Ōhira, Miyagi, Japan
- Area served: worldwide
- Products: Automobiles
- Revenue: ¥728,000,000,000 (March 2009)
- Parent: Toyota Motor Corporation
- Website: www.toyota-ej.co.jp/english

Central Motor Co., Ltd. (Note: In Japanese: セントラル自動車株式会社 (Sentoraru jidōsha kabushiki-gaisha)) was a Japanese manufacturer of cars within the Toyota Group. It was founded on 4 September 1950 by Ryuichi Tomiya. The company operated five plants, all located in Japan. It was one of the biggest export vehicle manufacturers of the concern. In July 2012 it was merged with two other Toyota subsidiaries operating in Tohoku to form Toyota Motor East Japan.

== History ==
Central Motors was the operational successor of Toyota's Kamata Plant (トヨタ自動車蒲田工場, Toyota Jidōsha Kamata kōjō) (Kamata, Tokyo). In 1950, employees of the Kamata Plant were made redundant after it was closed down by Toyota. They founded Central Motors that year and began producing light commercial vehicles for Toyota in 1956. In 1959, Toyota acquired the company and moved the production from Kamata to Sagamihara which would later also become the headquarters base. The company opened various facilities for auto parts production. A new assembly plant and headquarters were built in Ohira, Miyagi. The new facility started production in January 2011 and the Sagamihara plant was closed later that year.

On 1 July 2012, three Toyota subcontractors (Central Motors, Toyota Motors Tohoku and Kanto Auto Works) were combined into a single company, with all their manufacturing facilities and assets renamed as Toyota Motor East Japan, Inc. After the merger of the three former companies, the corporate headquarters was established at the former Central Motors site in Miyagi. There were just over 1,500 employees at the Central Motors location.

== Operations ==
At closing, Central Motors operated the following facilities:

- Ohira, Miyagi (headquarters)
- Ohira, Miyagi (car assembly plant)
- Wakayanagi, Miyagi (auto parts plant)

Central Motors mainly manufactured vehicles for export to Europe or North America. Special vehicles such as police, fire department vehicles as well as campers were produced by the company. Production also included CKD kits of the Toyota Tundra.

== Model gallery ==
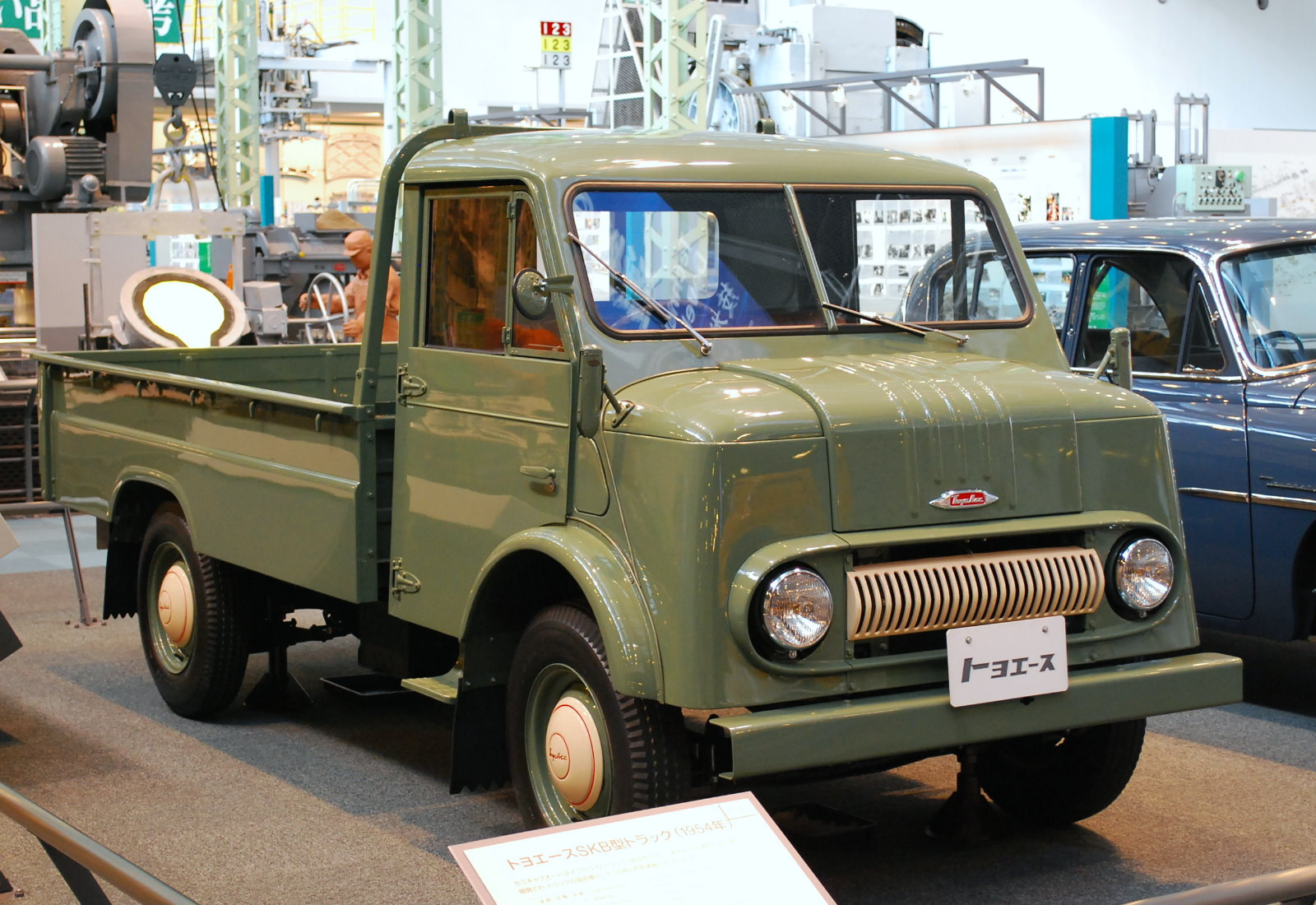
Toyopet Toyoace SKB
1956–1959

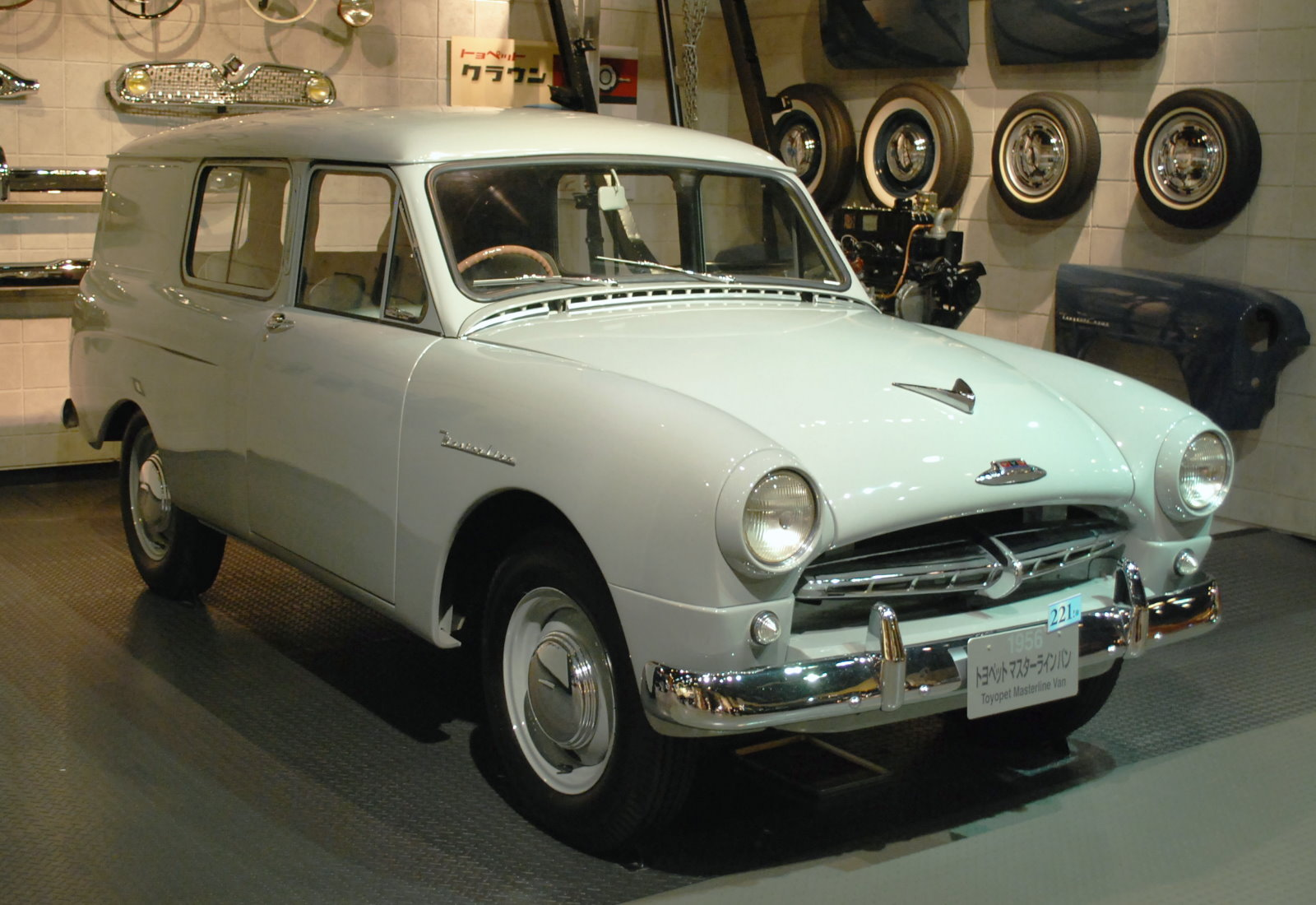
Toyopet Masterline
1957–1961

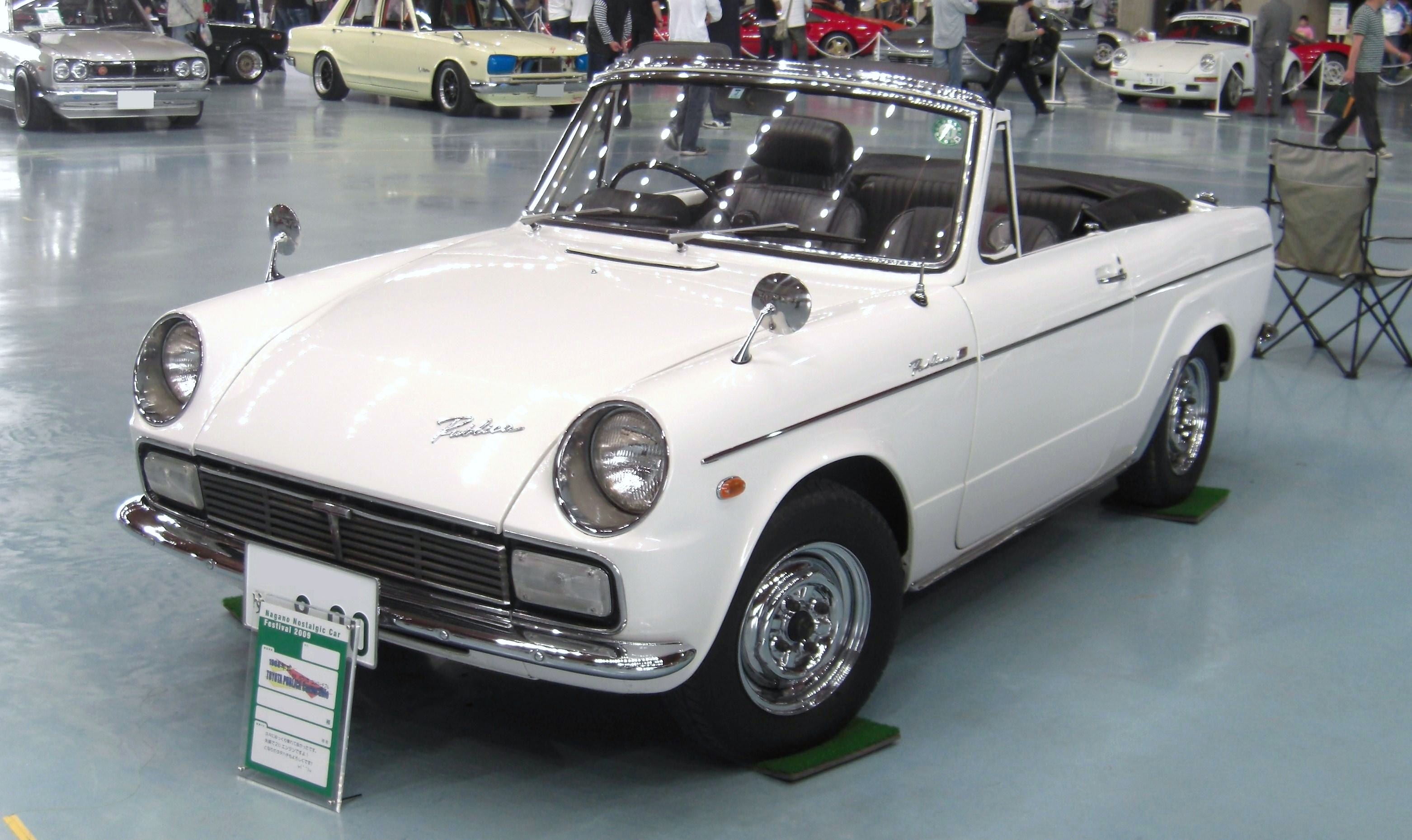
Toyopet Publica Convertible
1963–1968

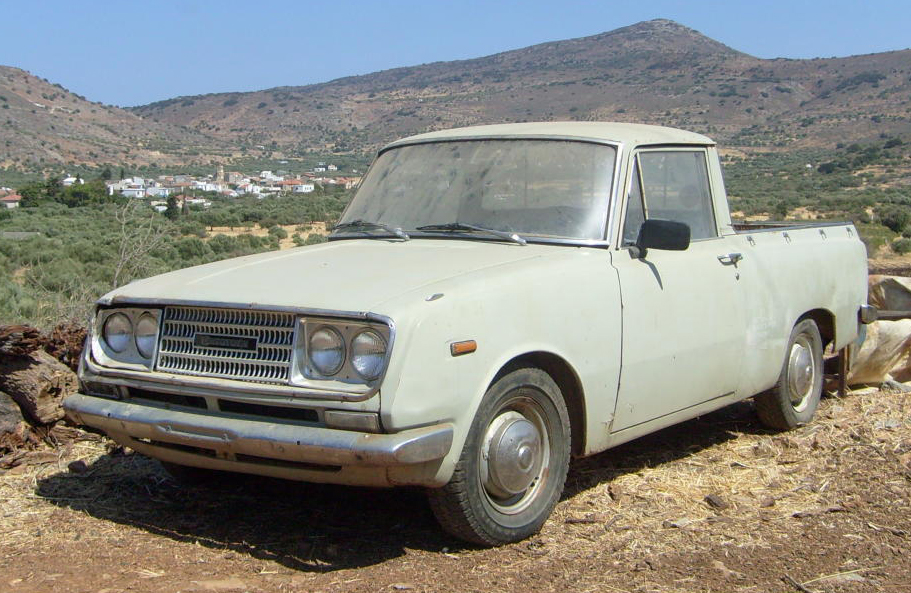
Toyopet Corona Pickup
(1964 bis 1968)

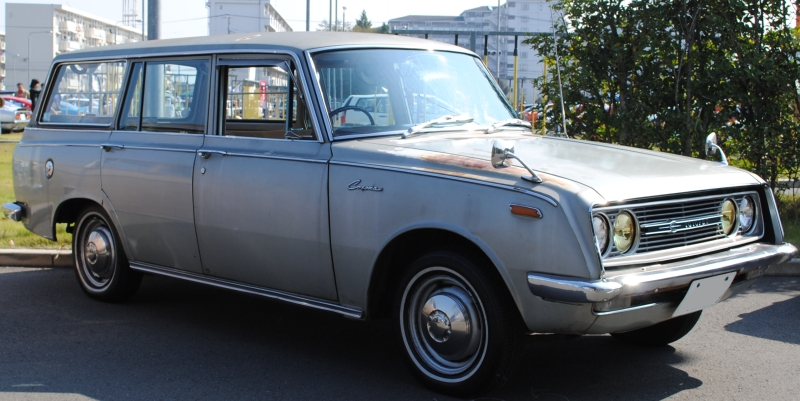
Toyopet Corona Van
1965–1970

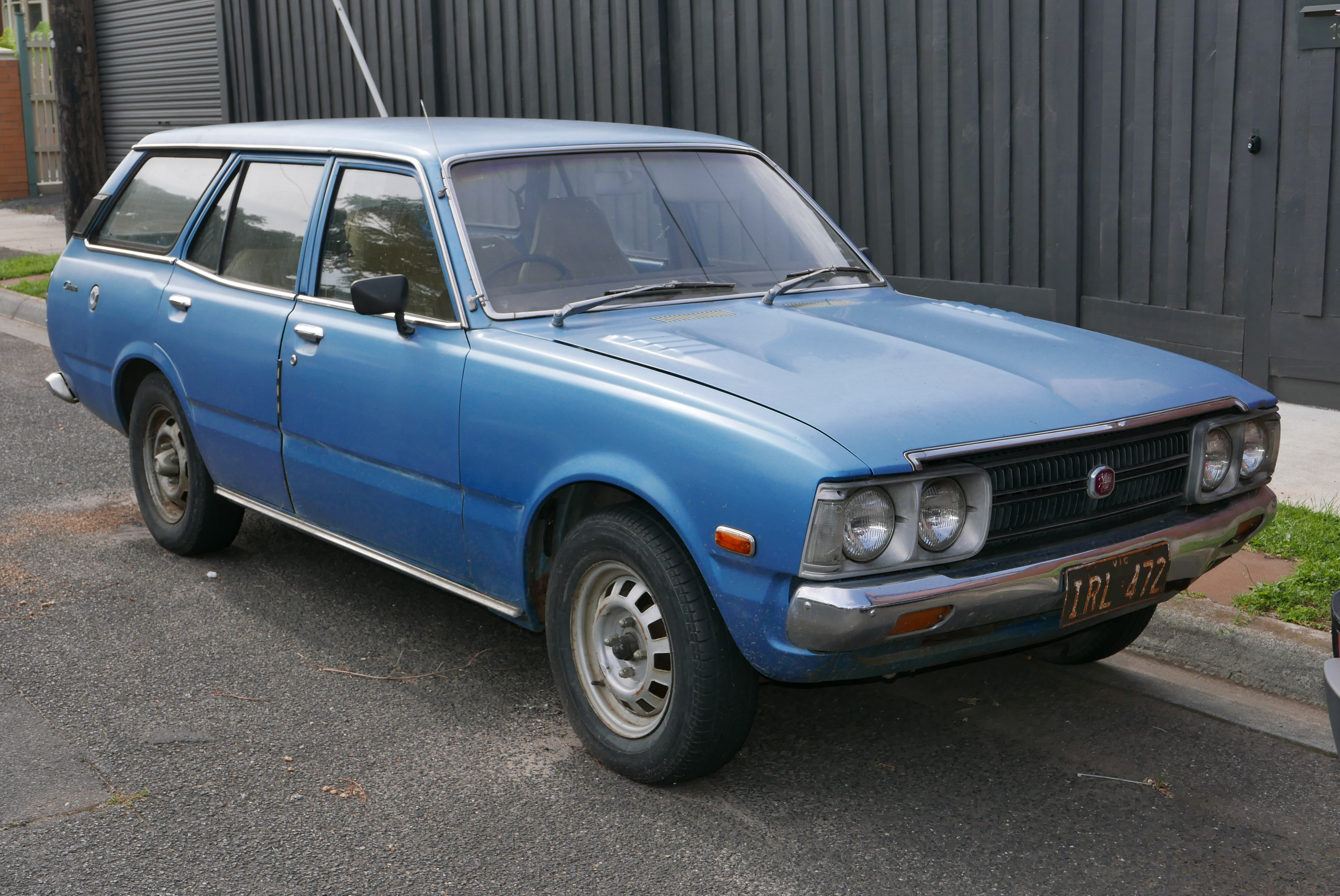
Toyopet Corona Van
1973–1978

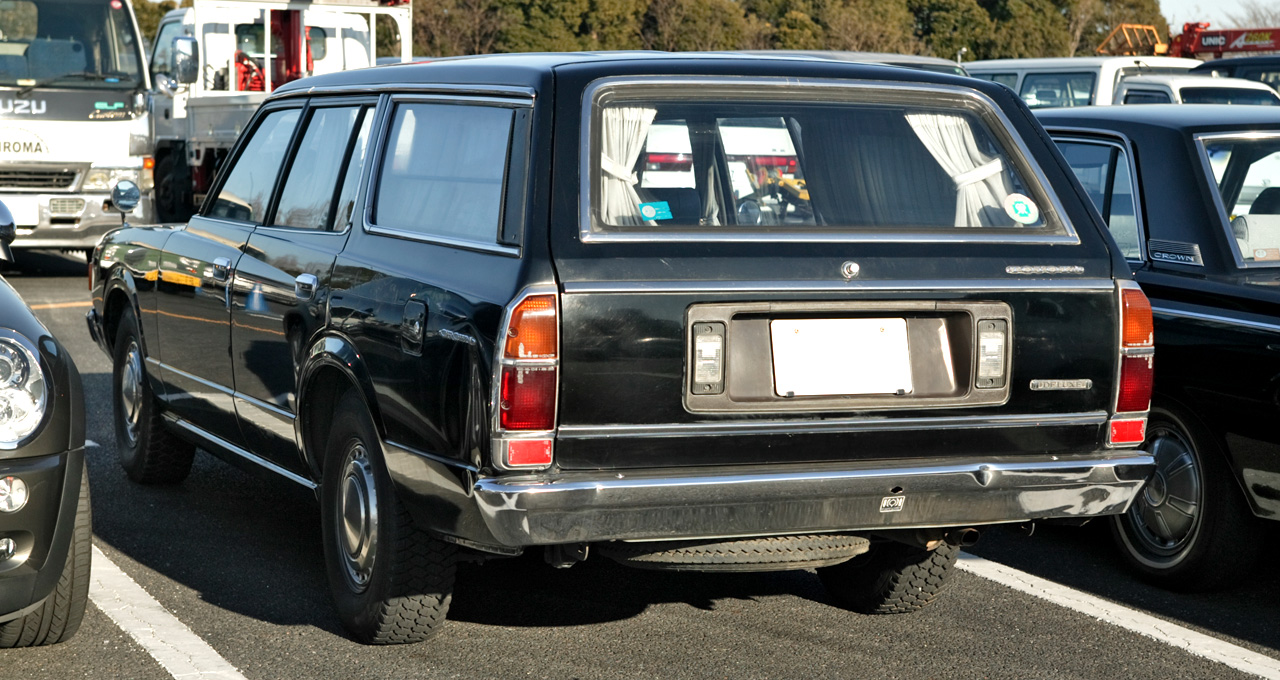
Toyopet Crown Station Wagon
1974–1979

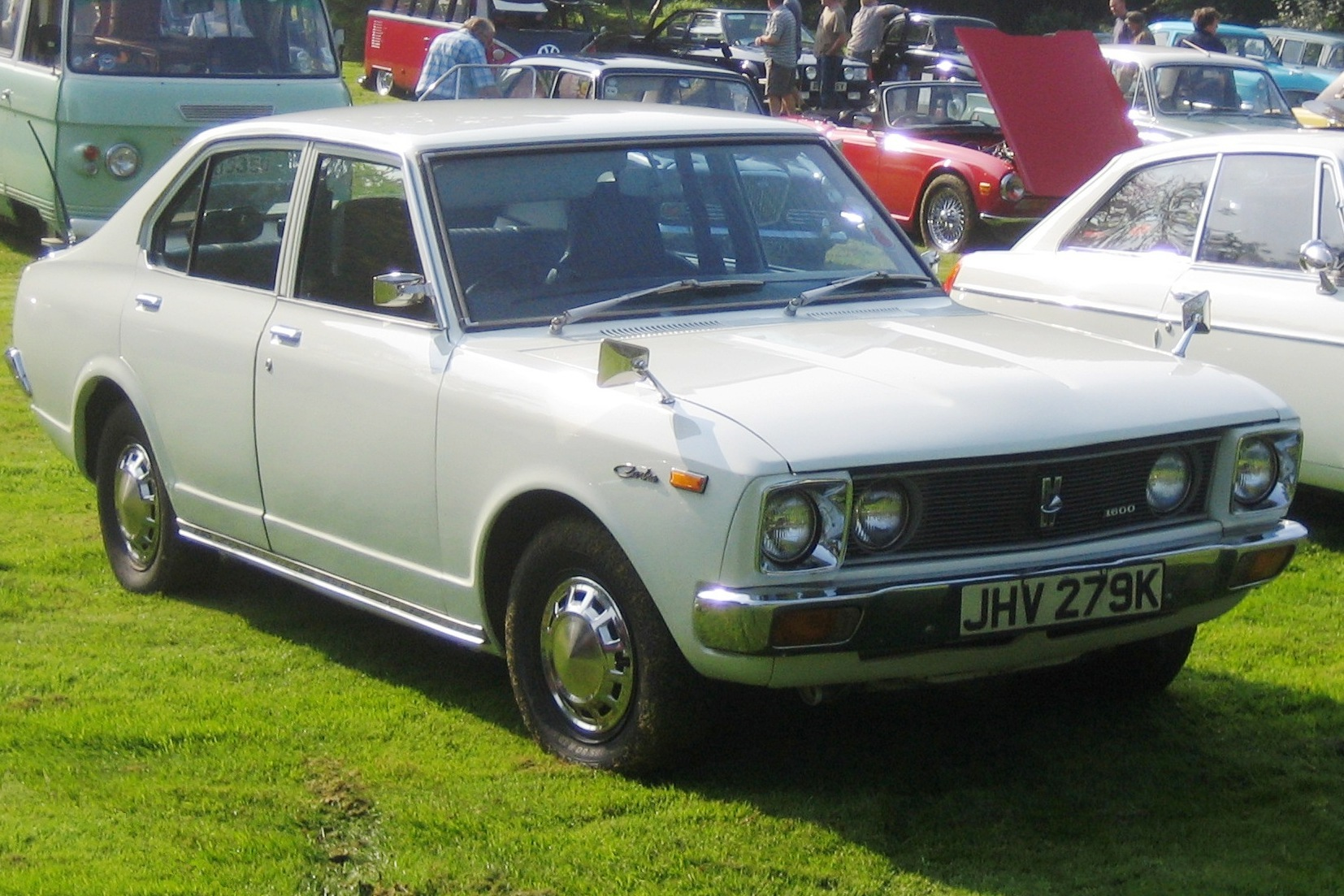
Toyota Carina
1975–1977

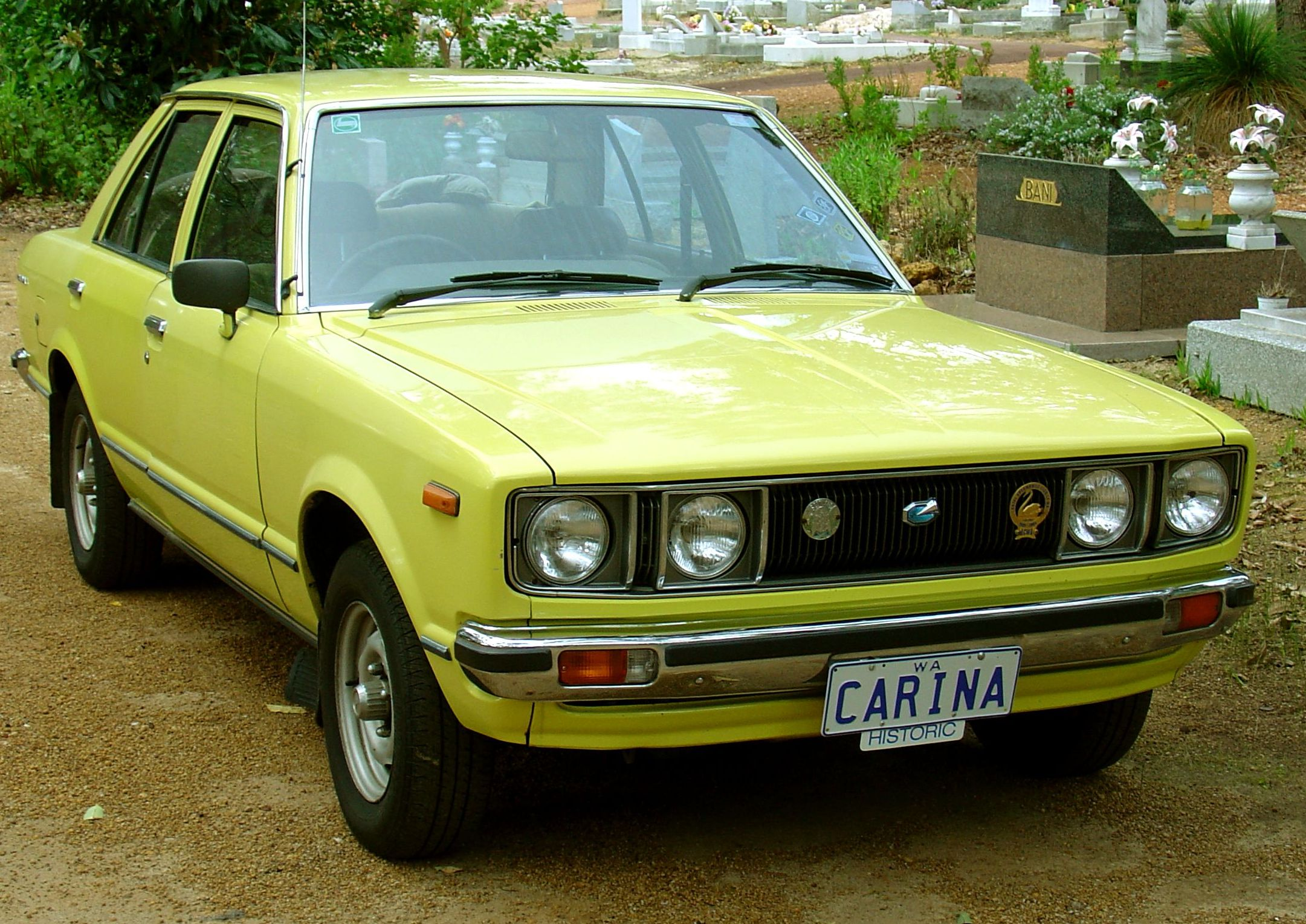
Toyota Carina
1977–1981

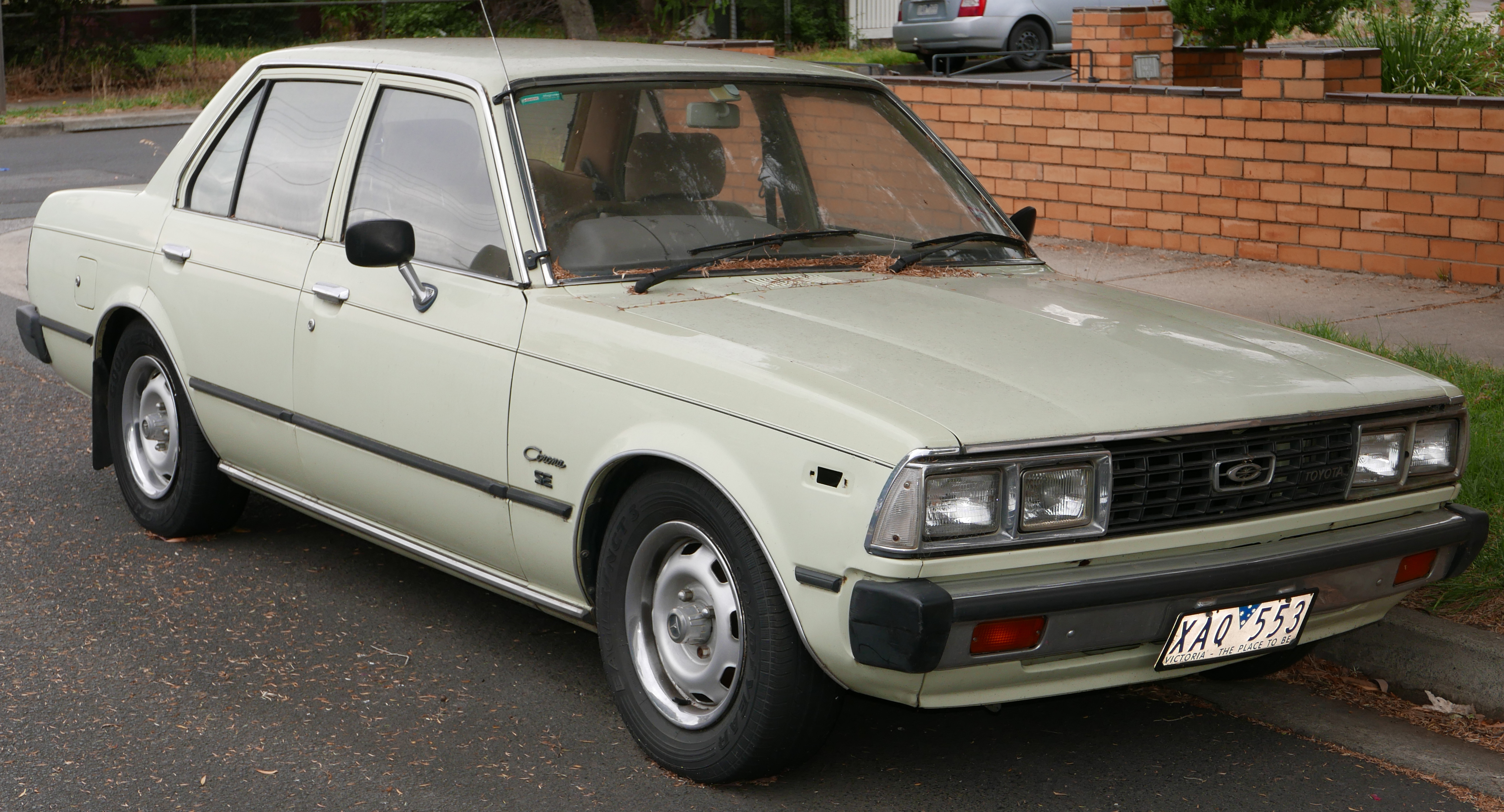
Toyota Corona Sedan
1978–1981

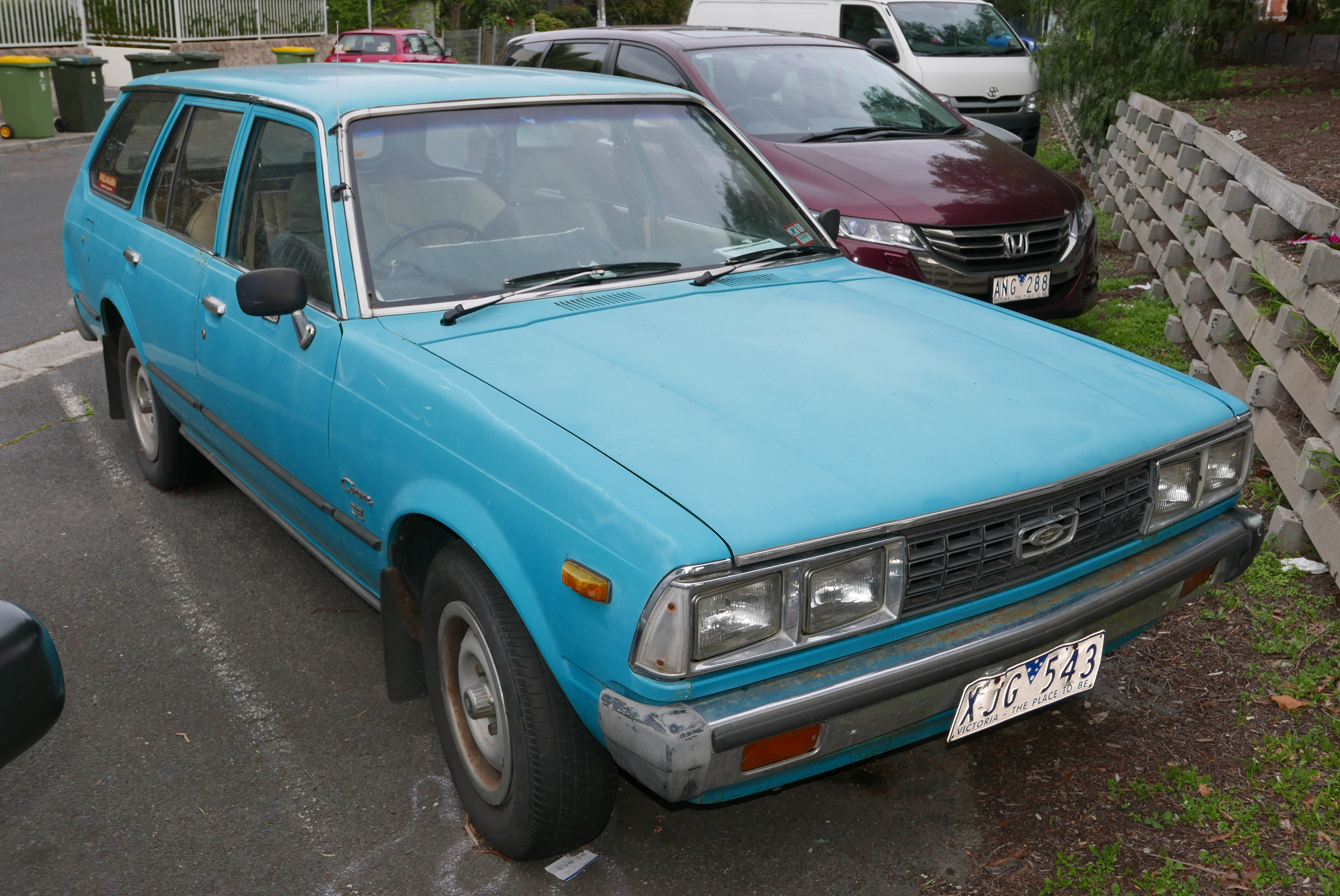
Toyota Corona Van
(1978–1982)

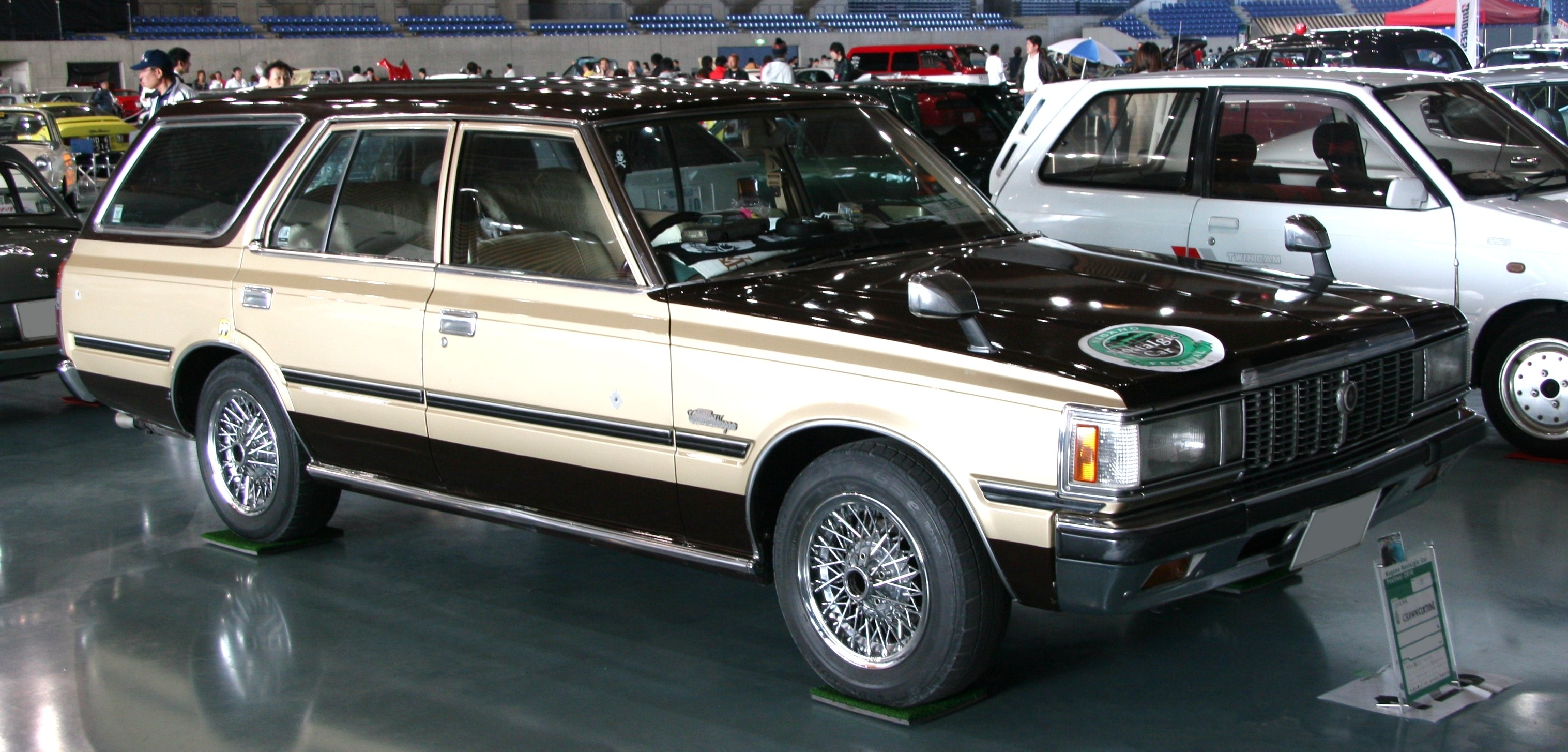
Toyota Crown Station Wagon
1979–1983

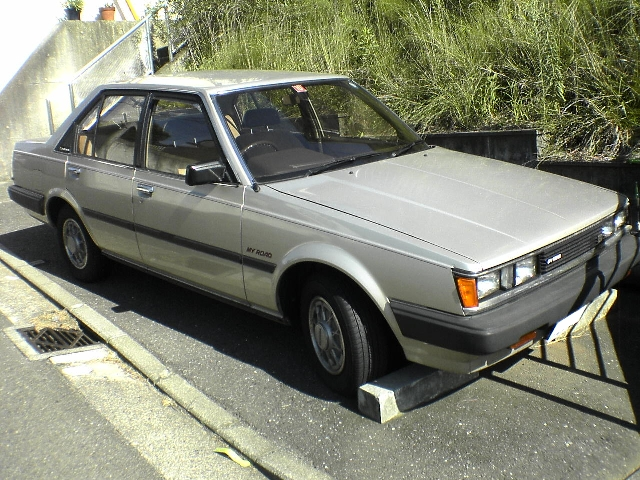
Toyota Carina
1981–1987

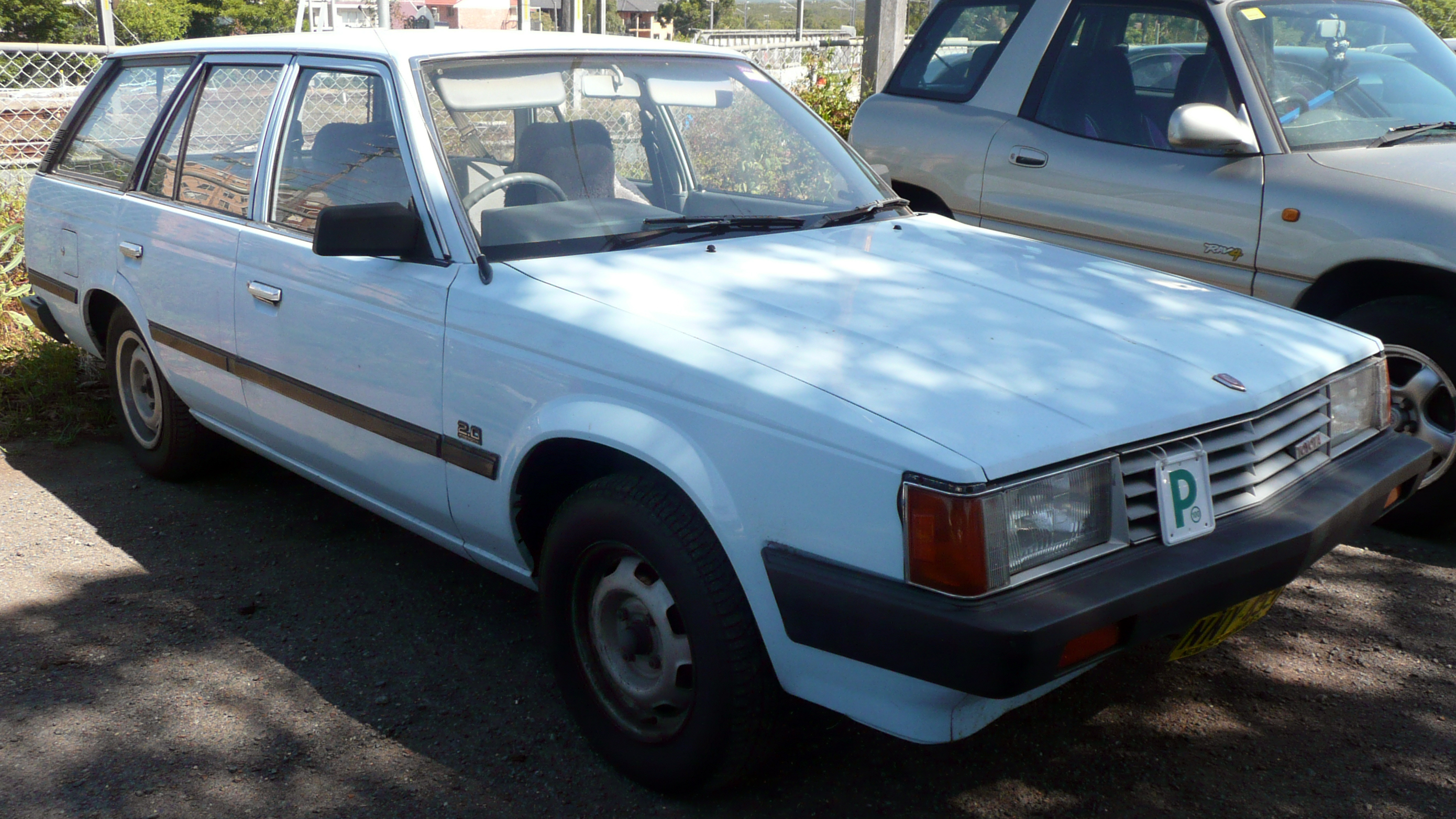
Toyota Corona Van
1982–1987

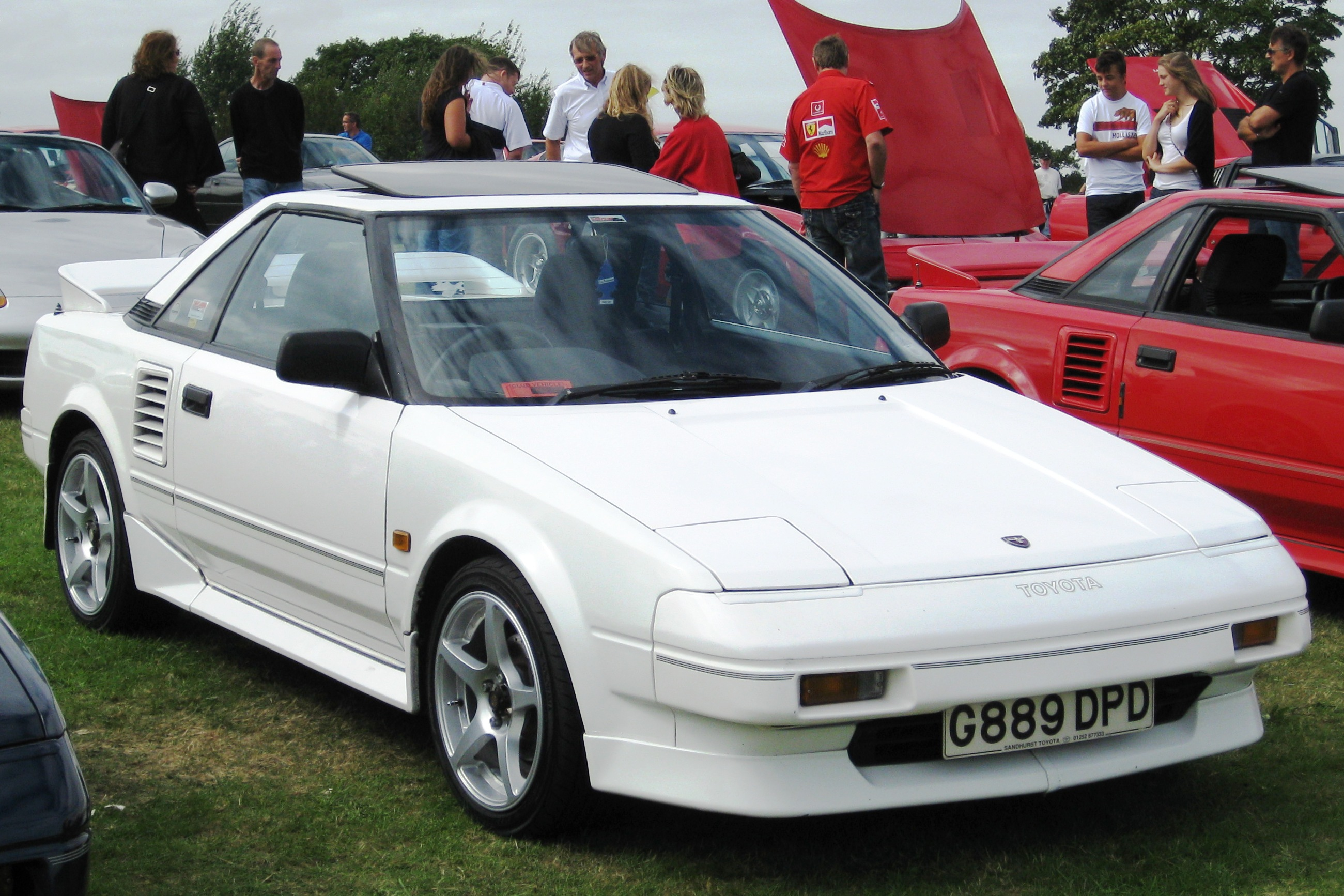
Toyota MR2
1984–1989

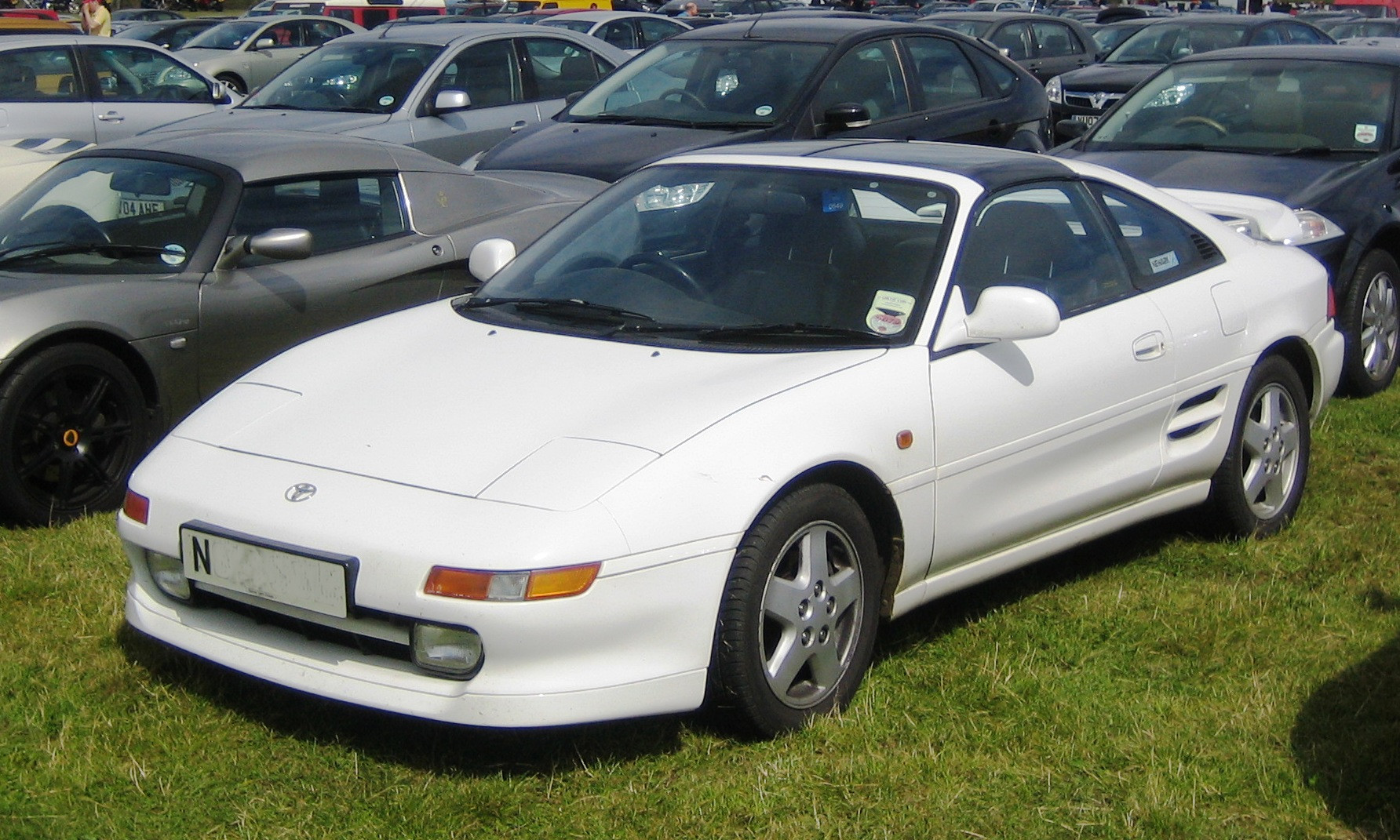
Toyota MR2
1989–1999

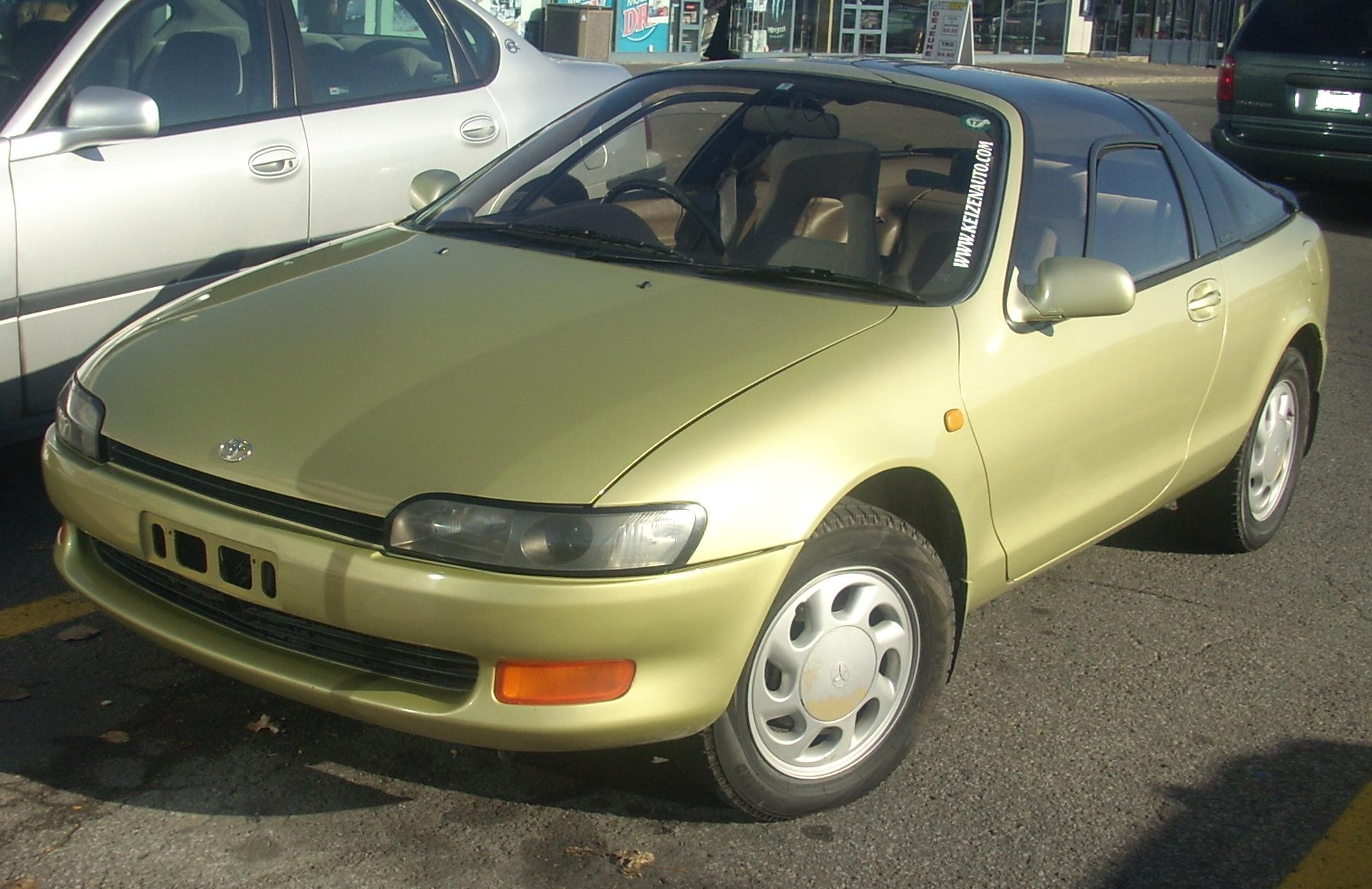
Toyota Sera
1990–1995

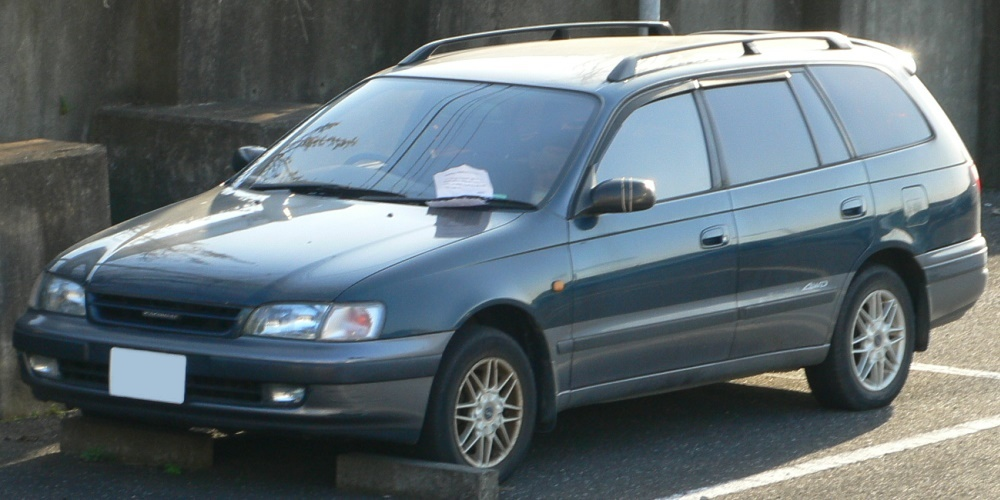
Toyota Caldina
1993–1997

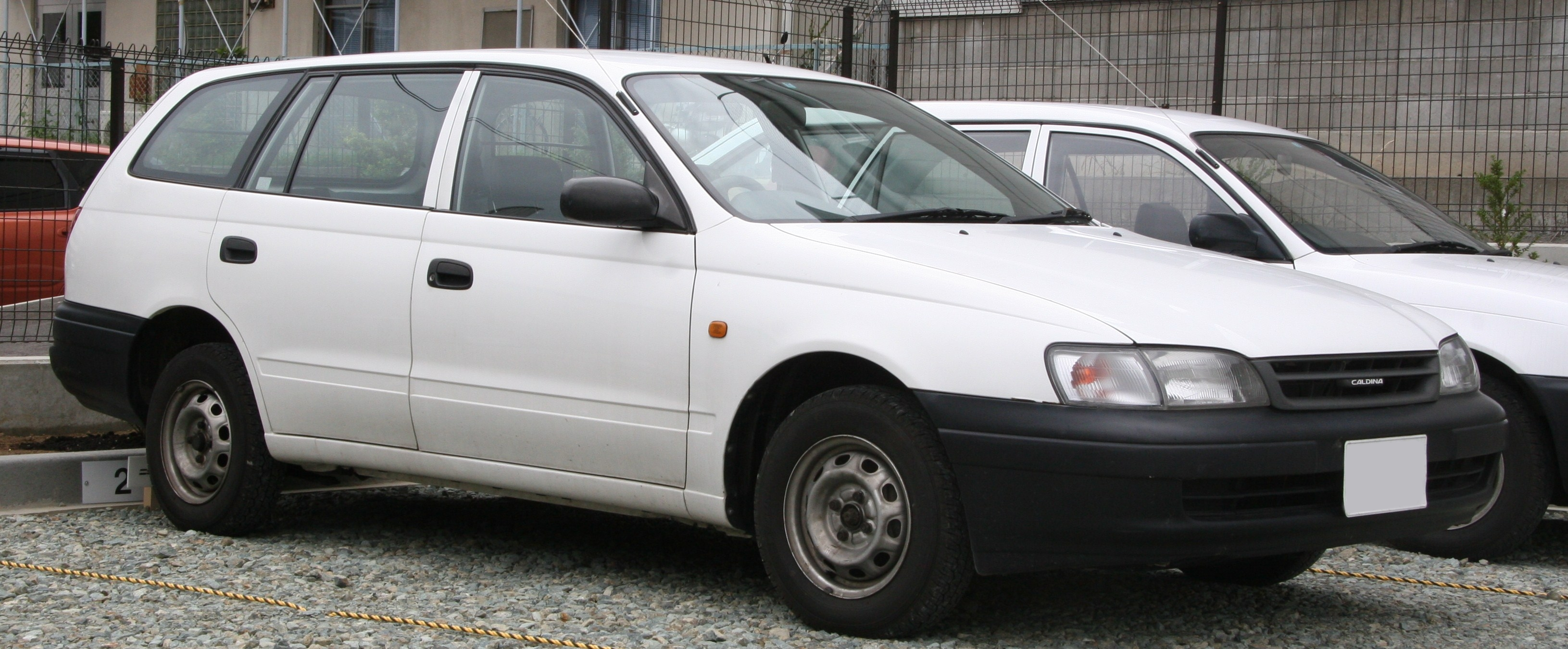
Toyota Caldina Van
1993–2002

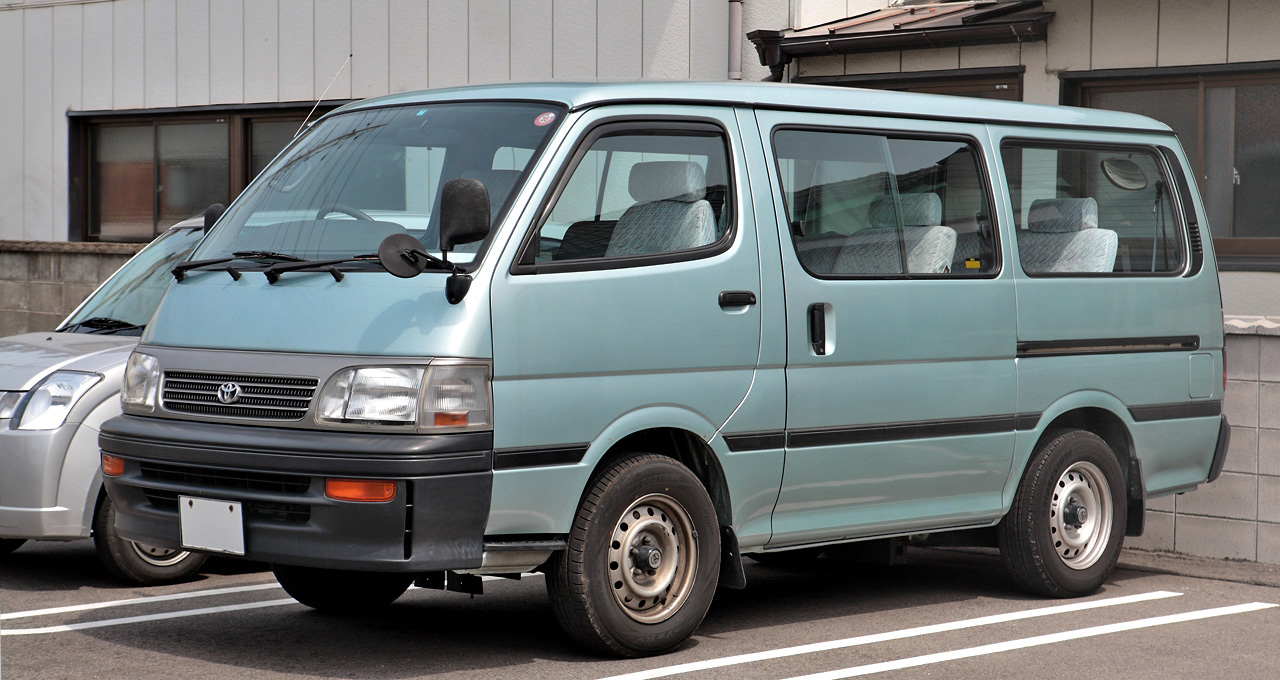
Toyota Hiace
1993–1996

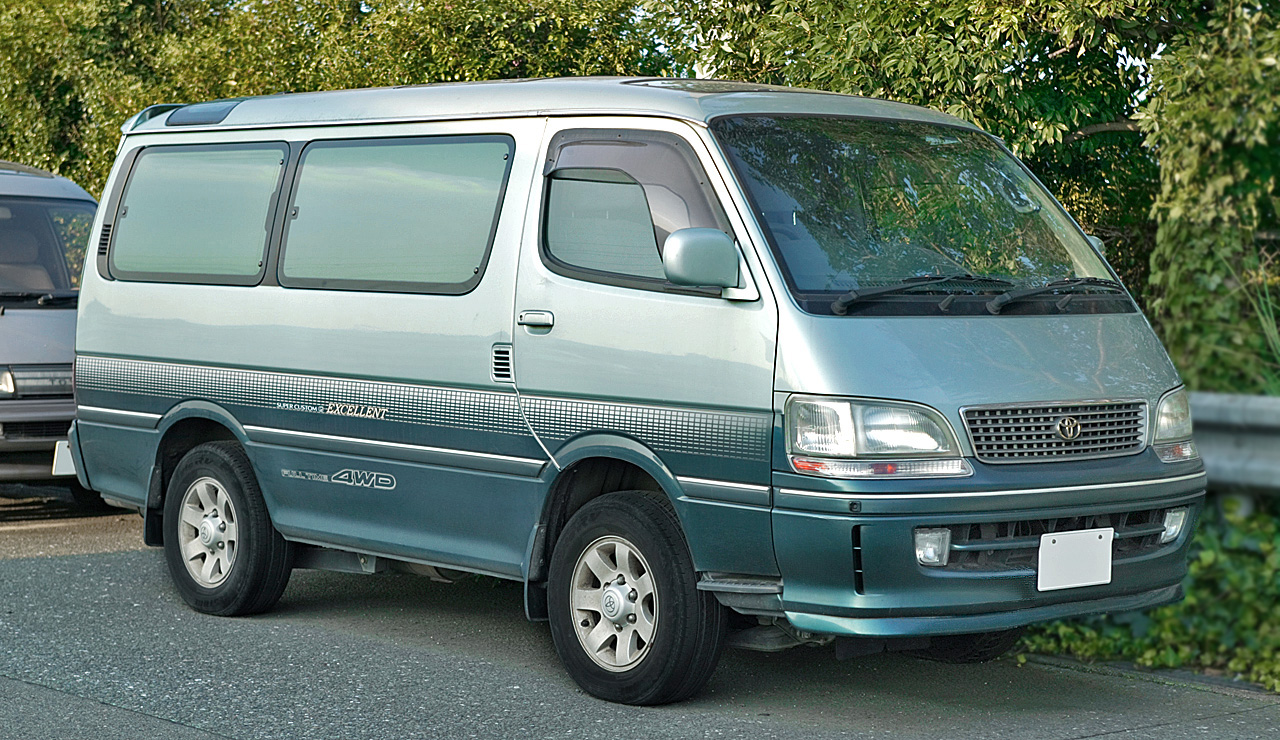
Toyota Hiace
1996–2000

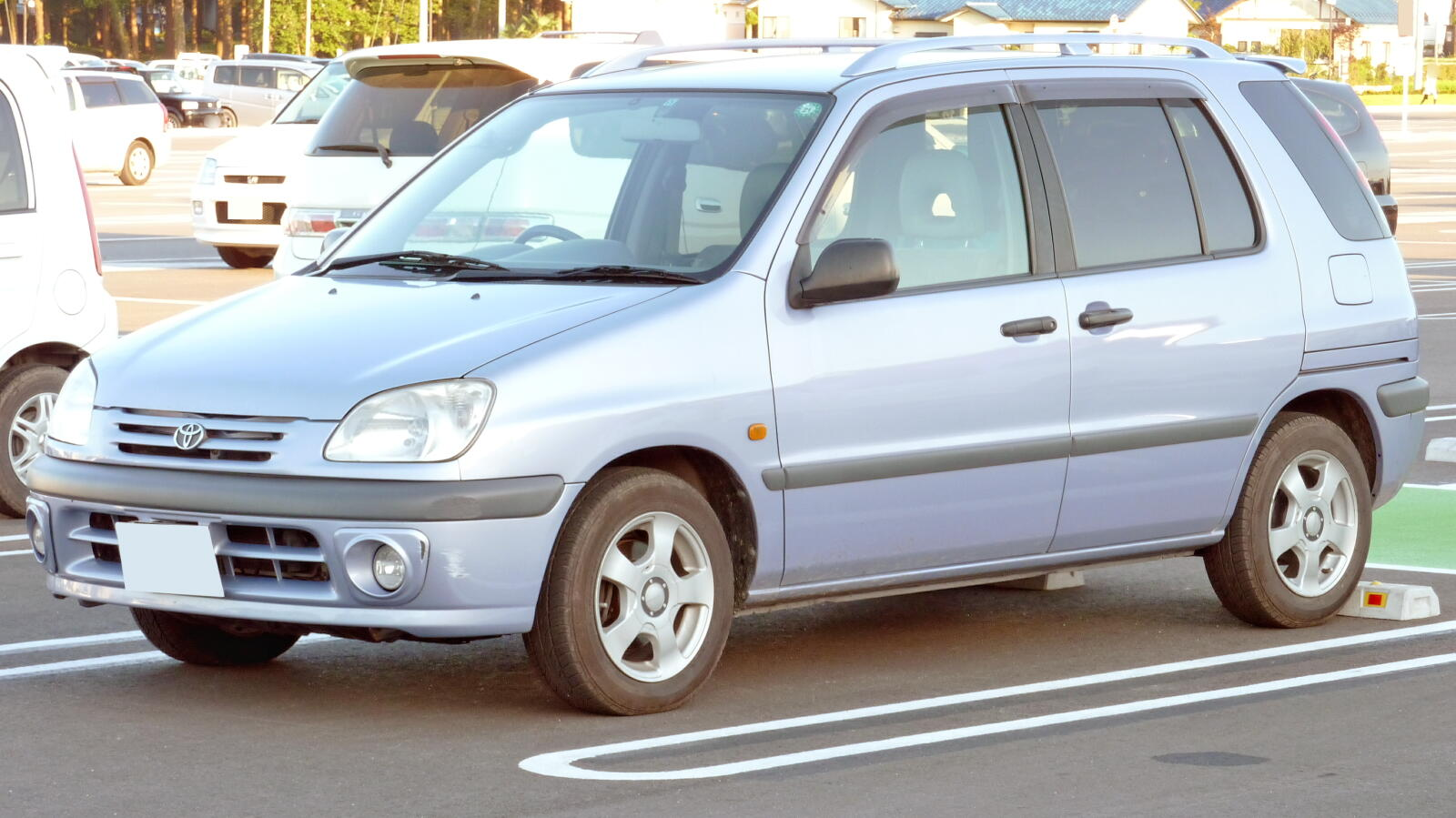
Toyota Raum
1997–2003

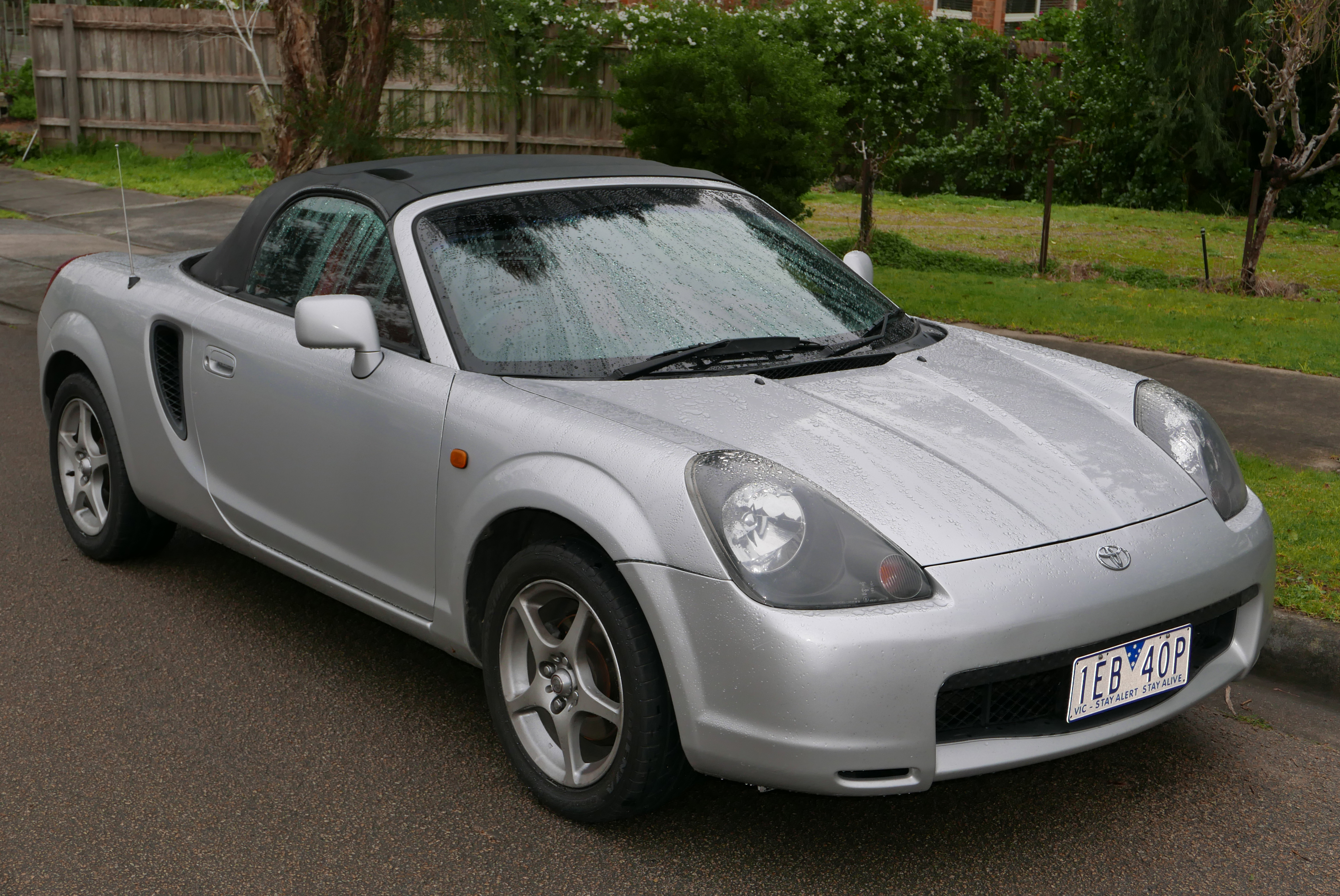
Toyota MR-S
1999–2007

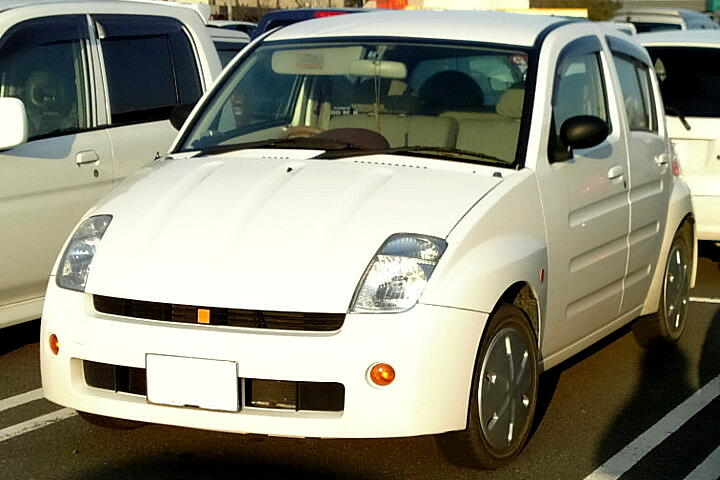
WiLL Vi
2000–2001

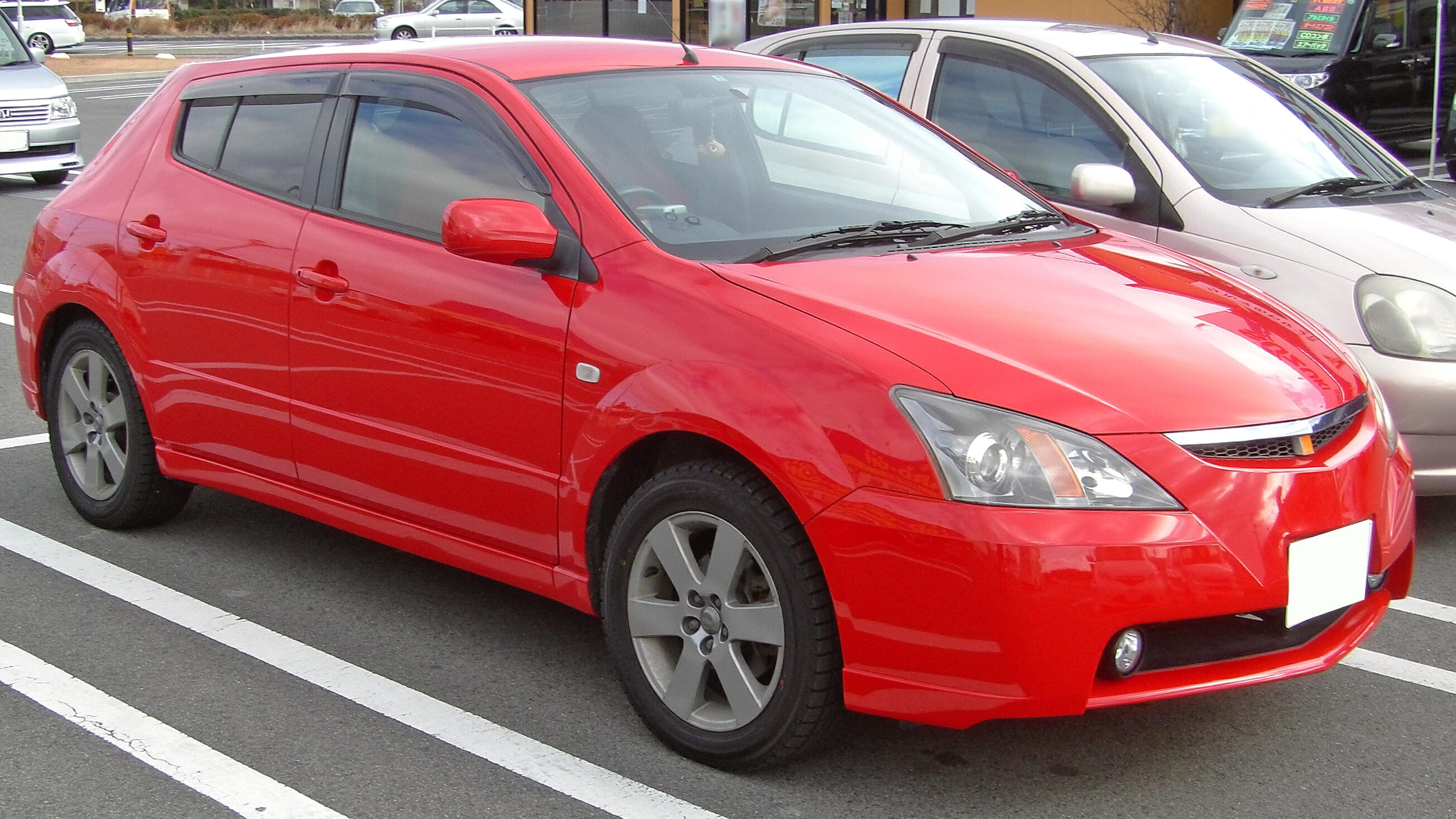
WiLL VS
2001–2004

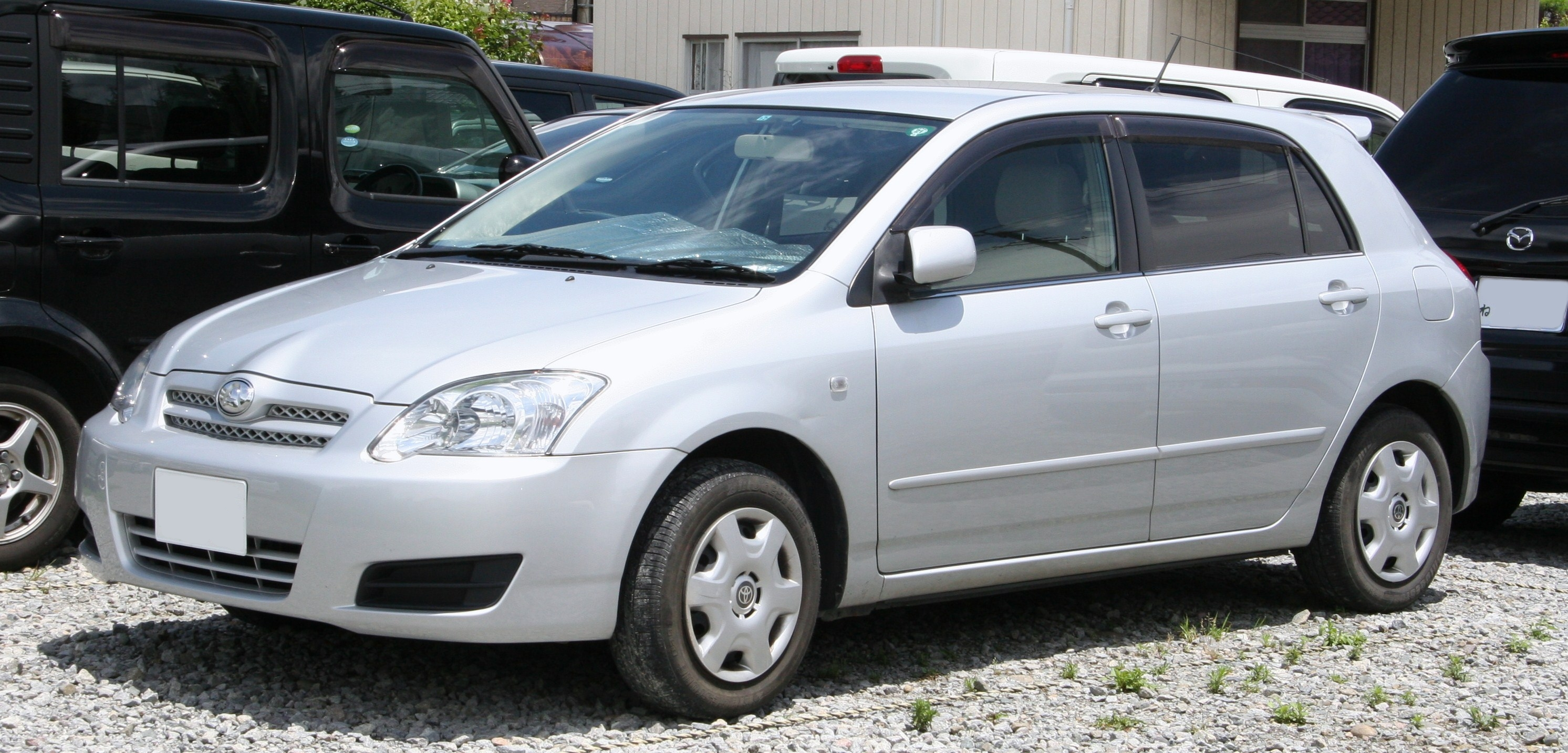
Toyota Allex
2001–2007

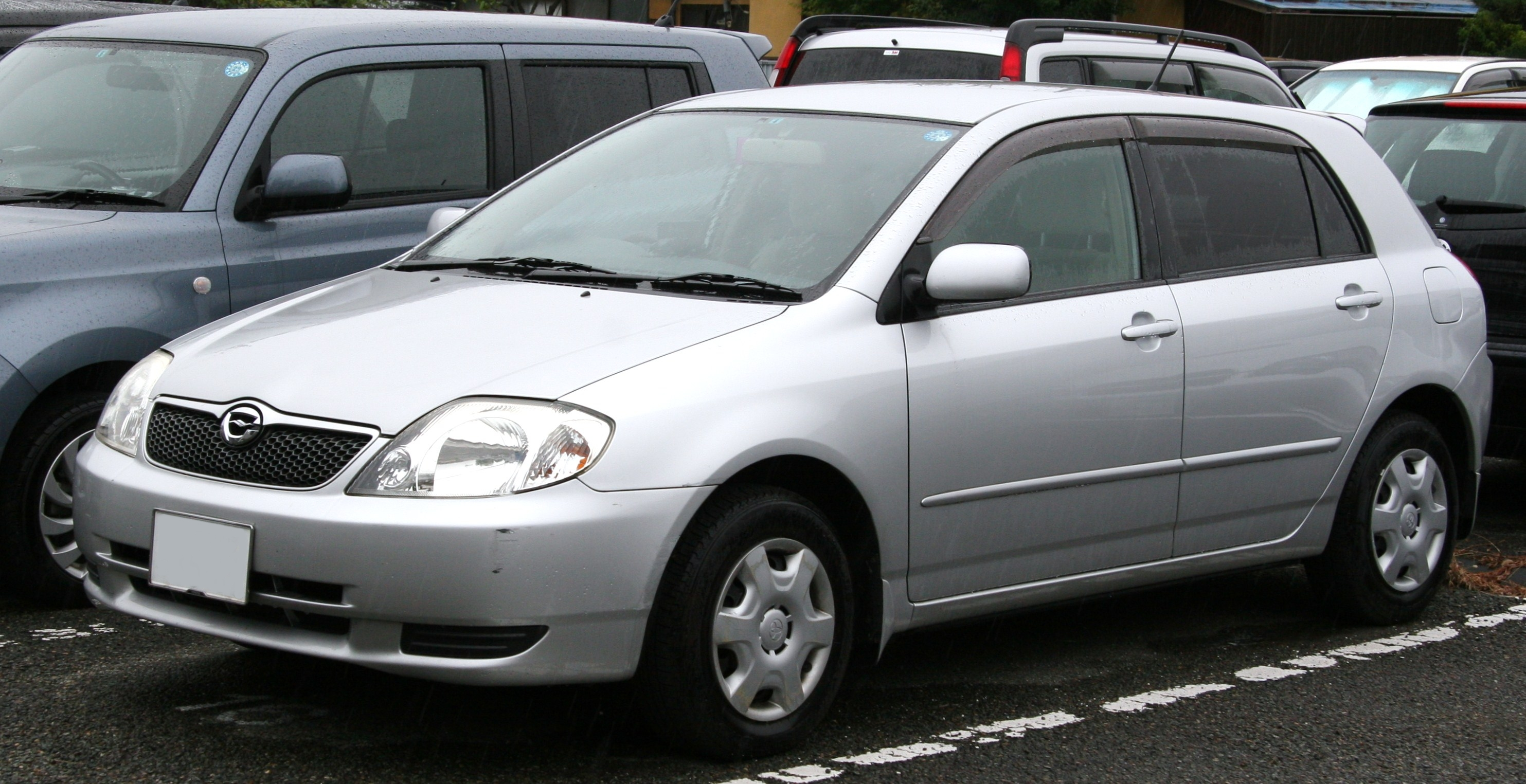
Toyota Corolla RunX
2001–2007

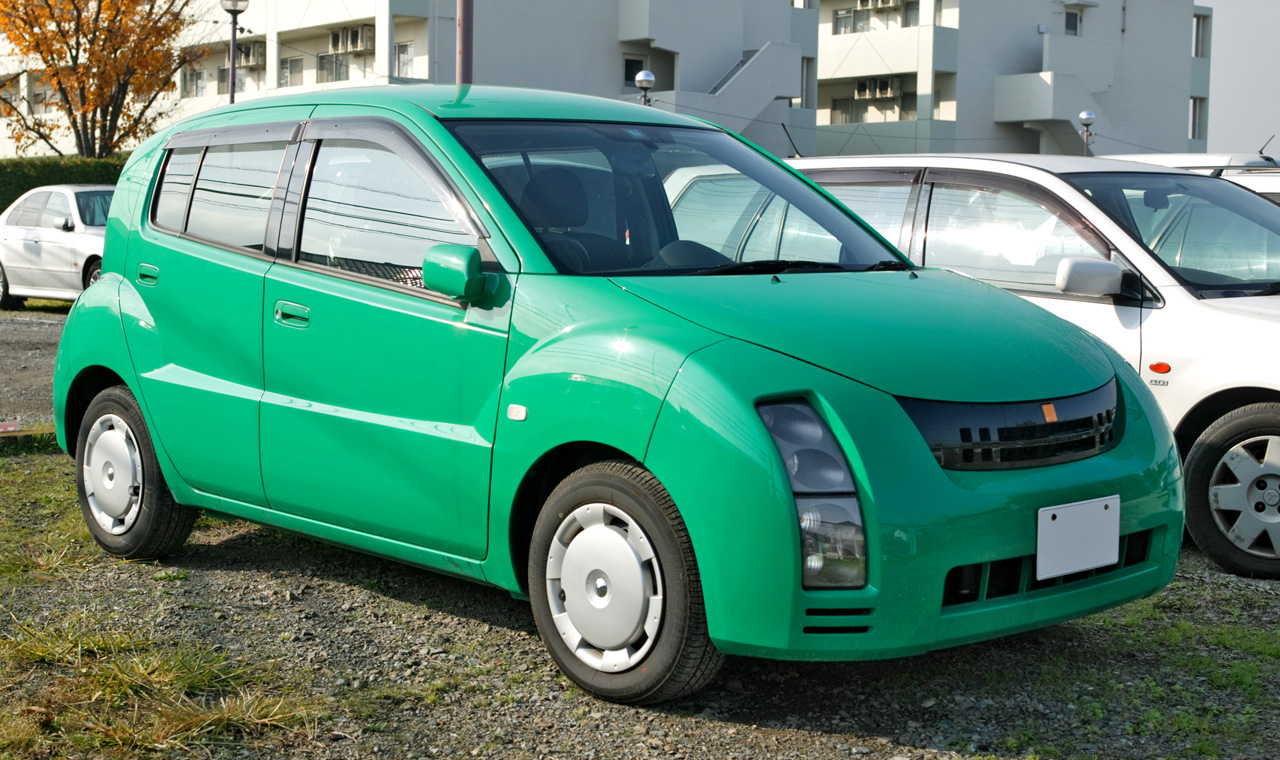
WiLL Cypha
2002–2005

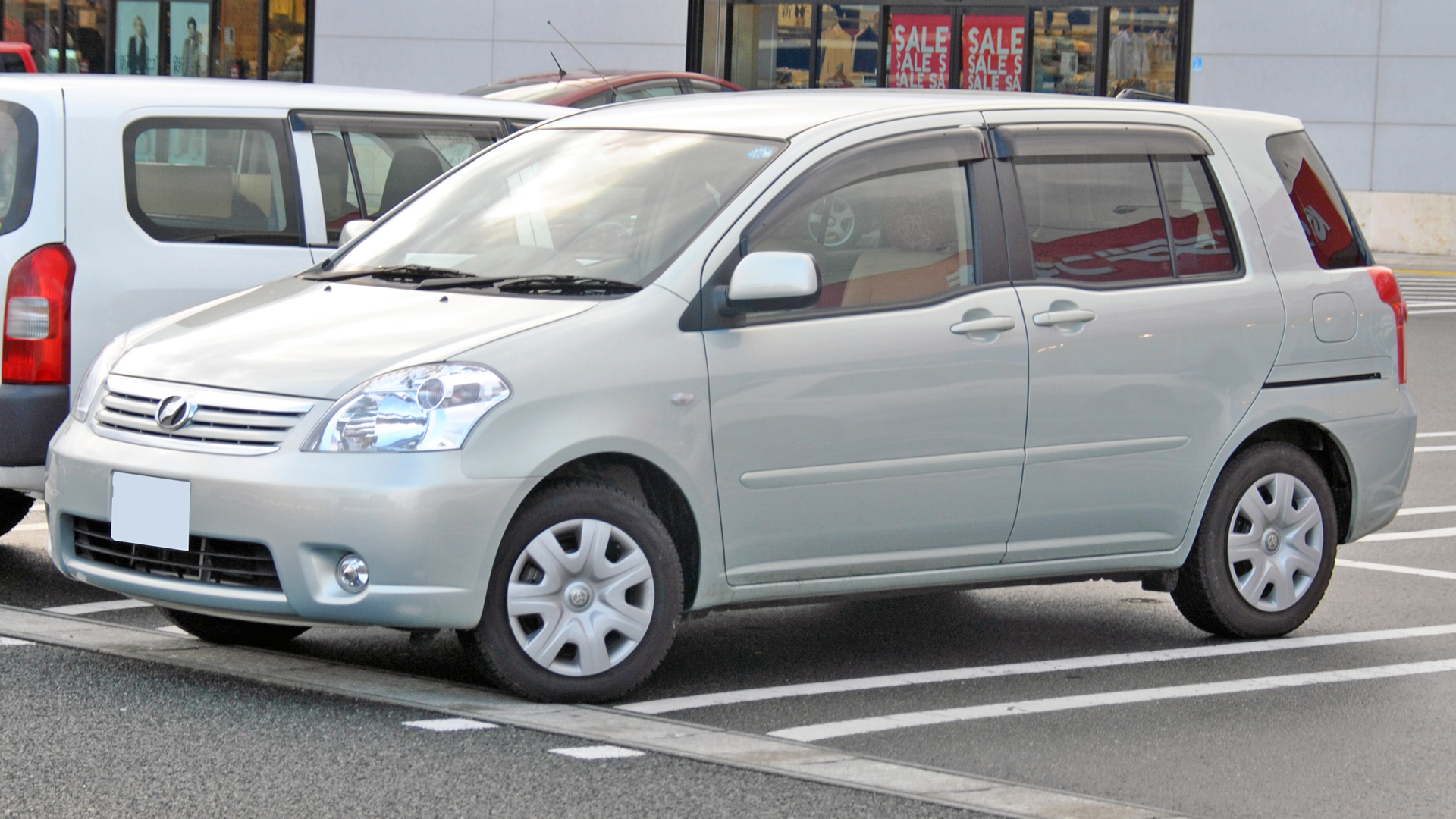
Toyota Raum
since 2003

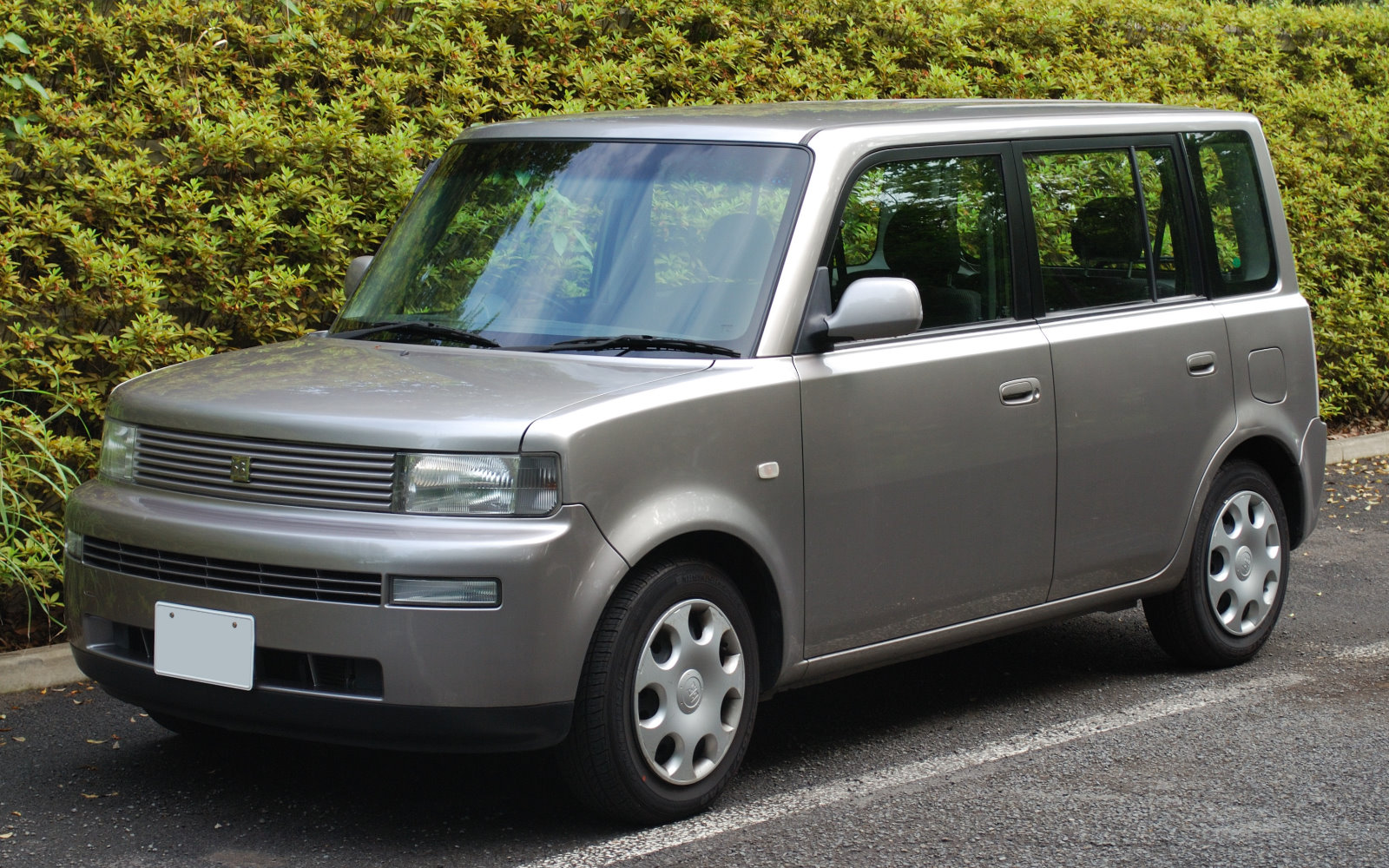
Toyota bB
2004–2005

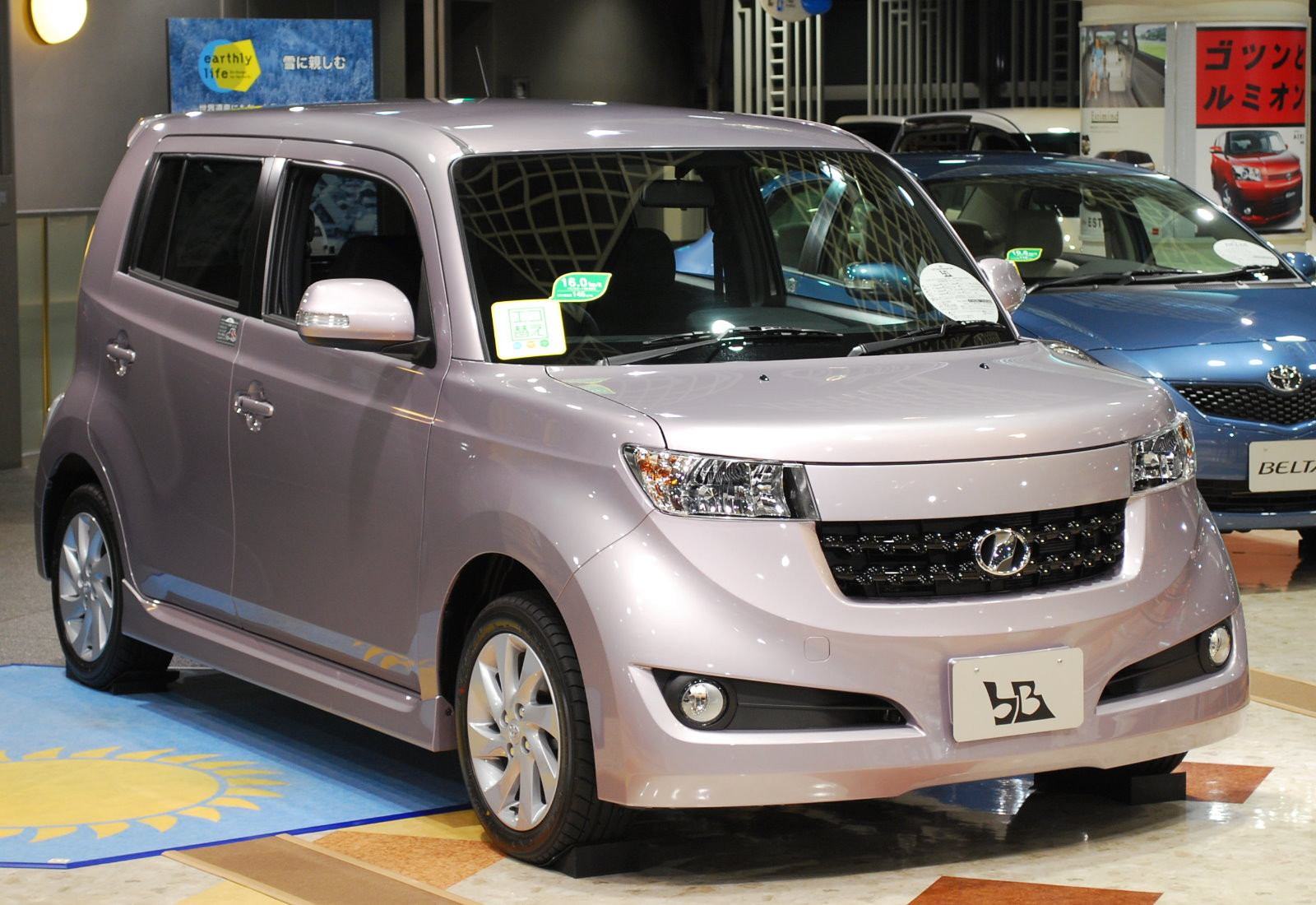
Toyota bB
2005–2007

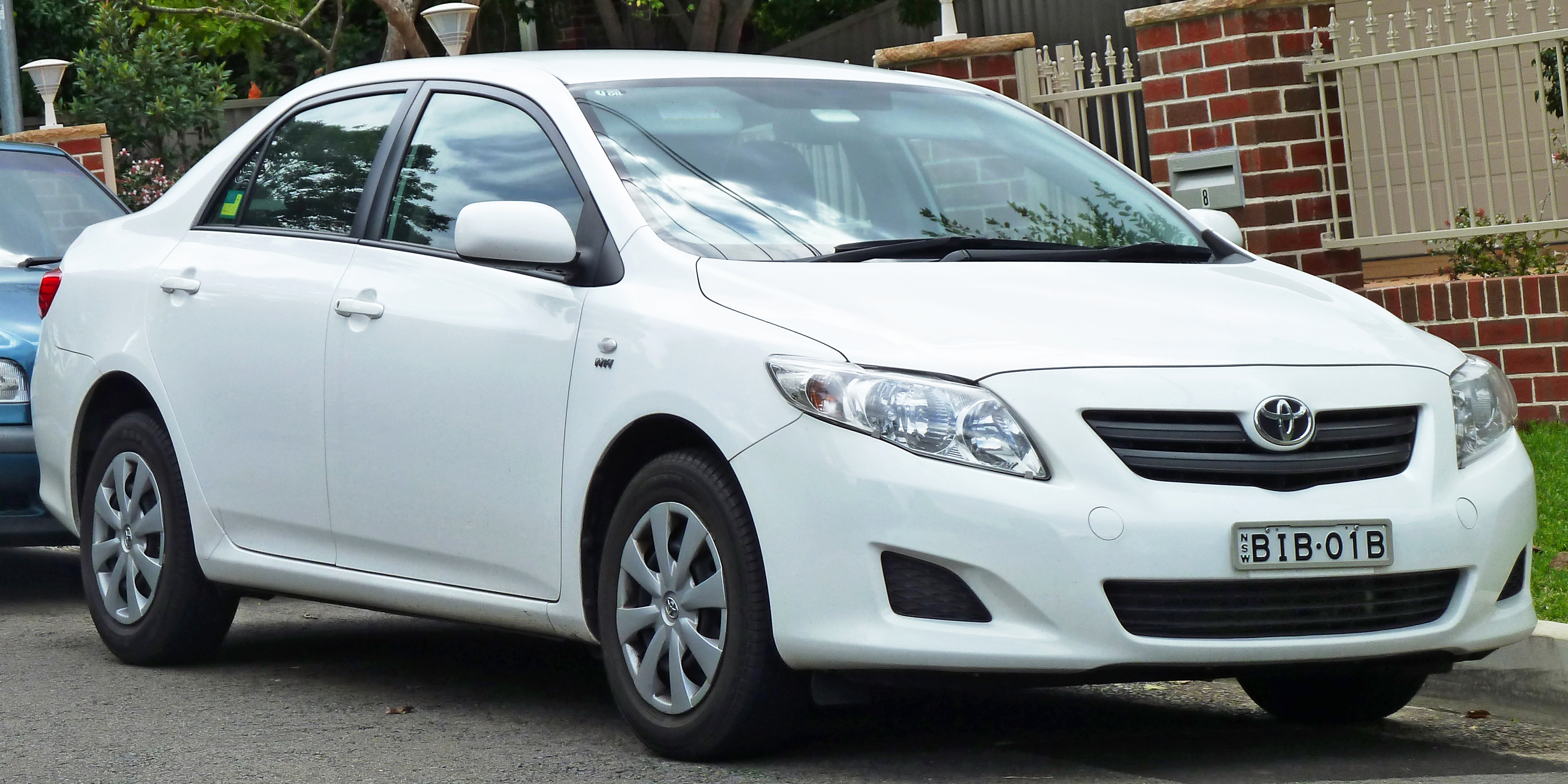
Toyota Corolla
2006–2013

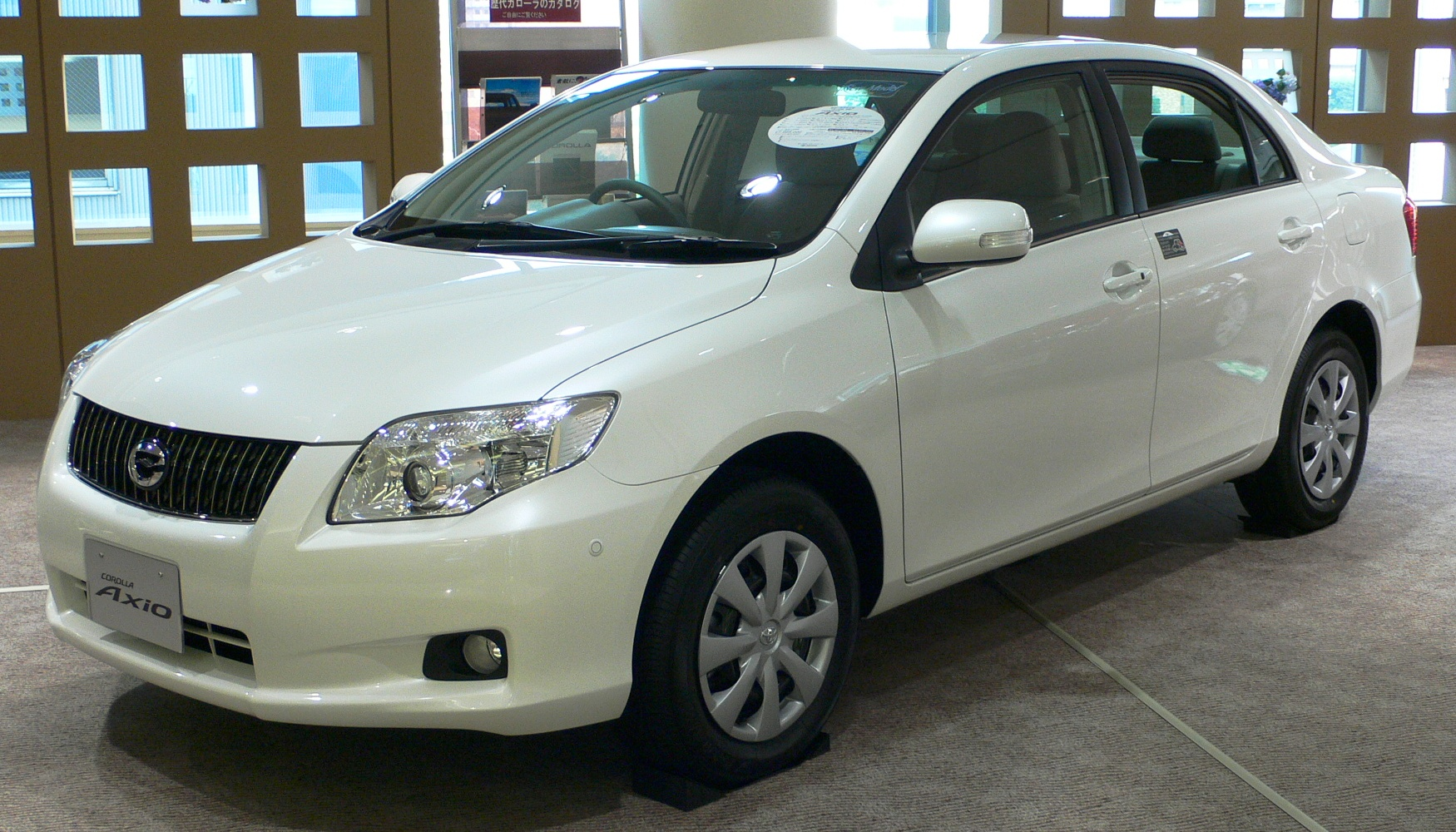
Toyota Corolla Axio
2006–2012

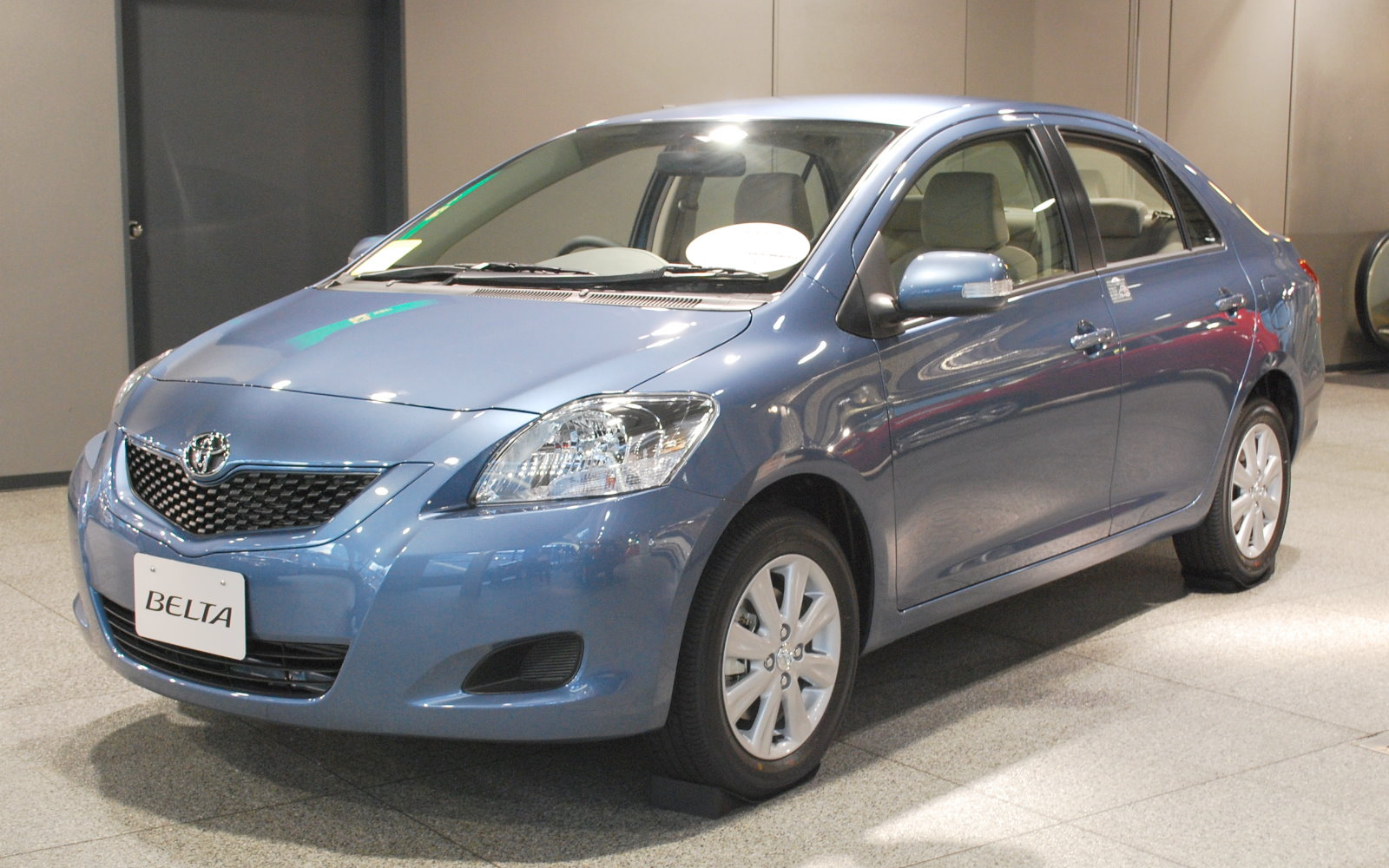
Toyota Belta
2007–2012

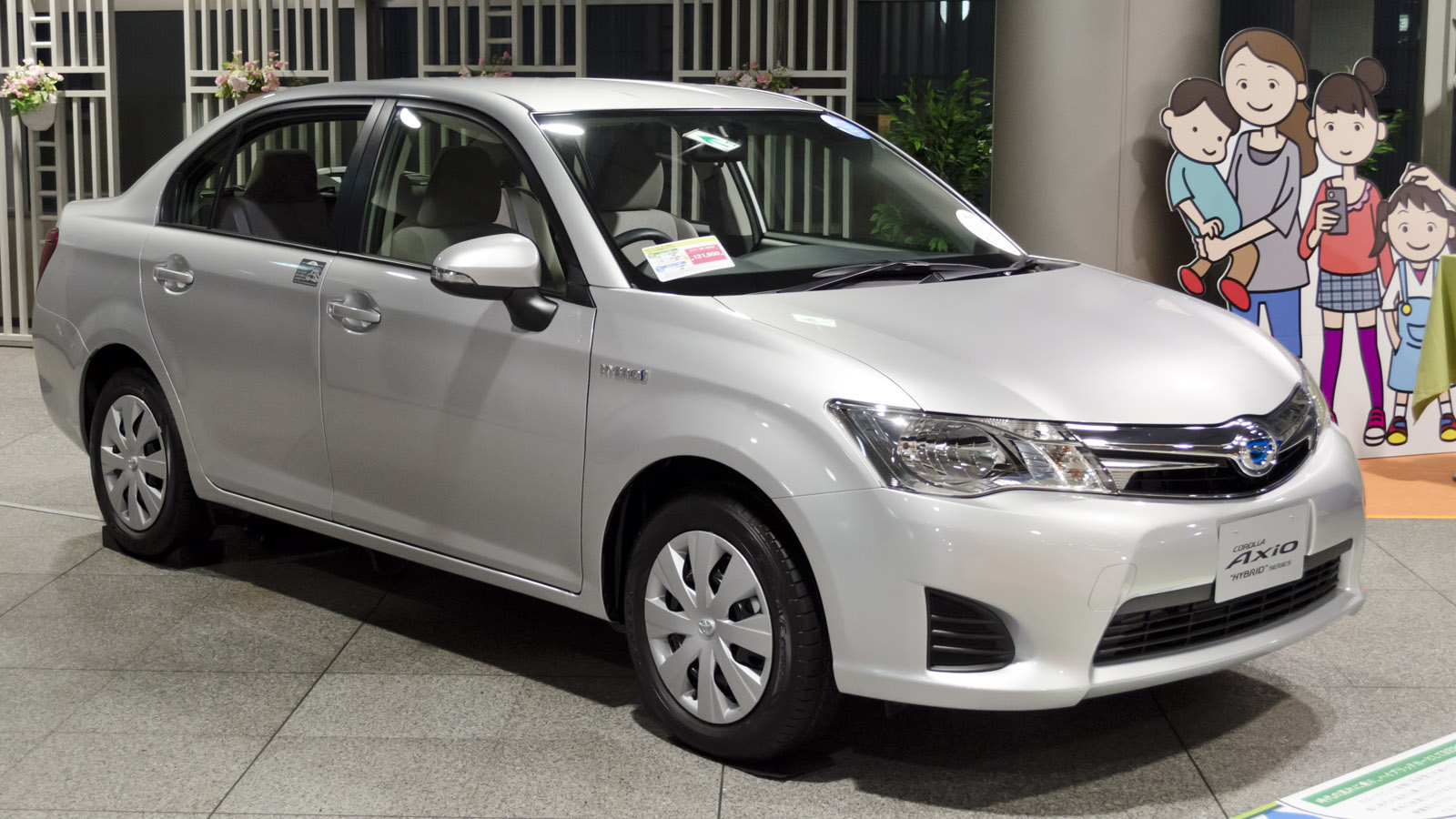
Toyota Corolla Axio
since 2012

Additional models that have no pictures yet:

- Toyota Dyna (1957–1959)
- Toyopet Type FS Ambulance (1961–1968)
- Toyopet Corona Mark II PickUp (1968–1971)
- Toyopet Crown Station Wagon (1973–1974)
- Toyopet Corona Van (1970–1973)
- Toyota Carina Surf (1982–1987)
- Toyota Tundra (CKD kits only)
