= Ōhira, Miyagi =

Ōhira 大衡村
- Village
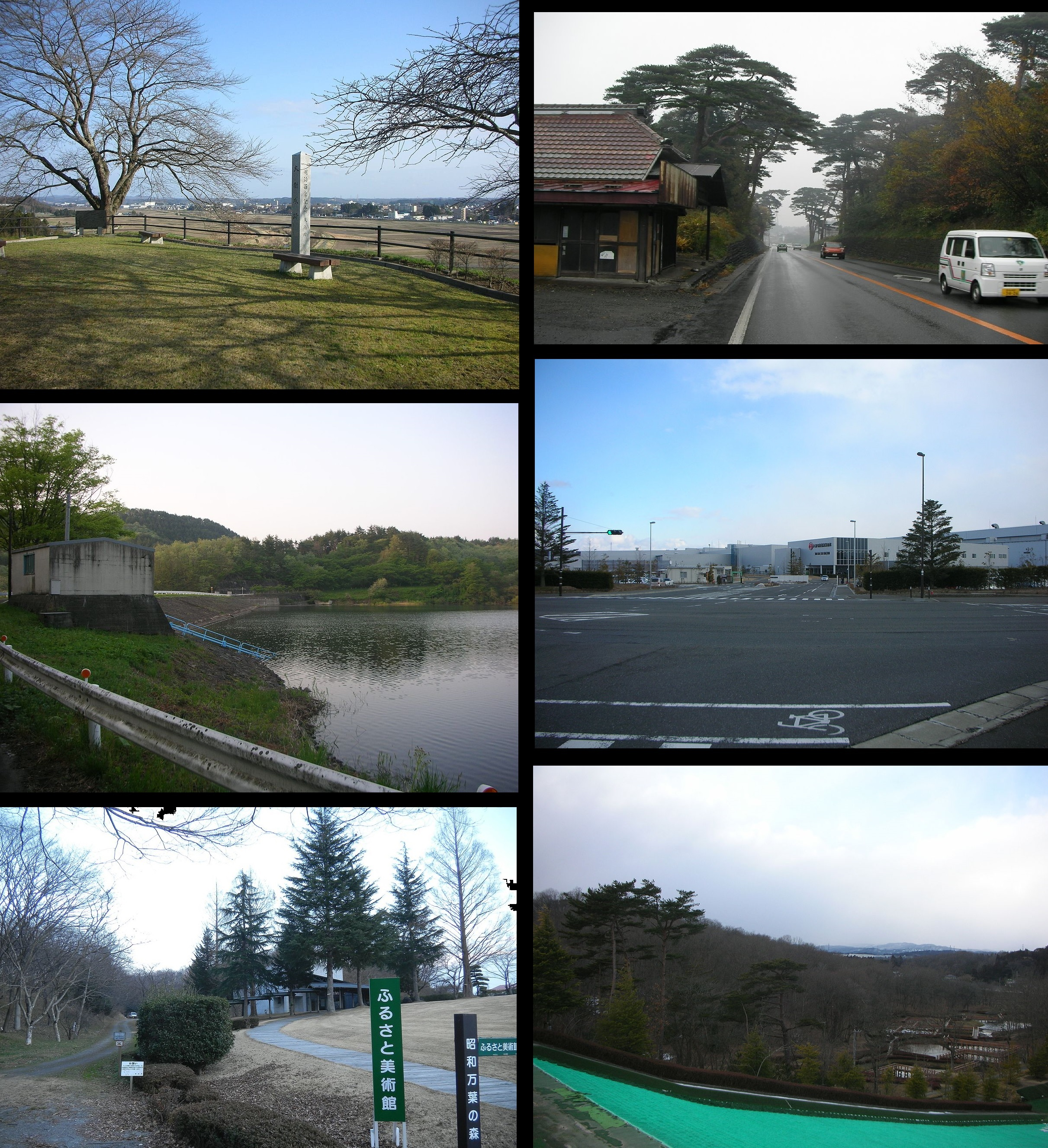
- Site of Ōhira Castle - National Route 4 Ushino Dam - Toyota factory Furusato Art Museum - Manyo Create Park

- Flag Seal

- Location of Ōhira in Miyagi Prefecture

- Coordinates: 38°28′2.1″N 140°52′47.2″E
- Country: Japan
- Region: Tōhoku
- Prefecture: Miyagi
- District: Kurokawa

Area
  - Total: 60.32 km^{2} (23.29 sq mi)

Population (May 31, 2020)
  - Total: 5,918
  - Density: 98.11/km^{2} (254.1/sq mi)
- Time zone: UTC+9 (Japan Standard Time)
- Phone number: 022-345-5111
- Address: 62 Hirabayashi, Ōhira-mura, Kurokawa-gun, Miyagi-ken 981-3692
- Climate: Cfa
- Website: Official website
- Symbols
- Bird: Green pheasant
- Flower: Kikyo
- Tree: Japanese Red Pine

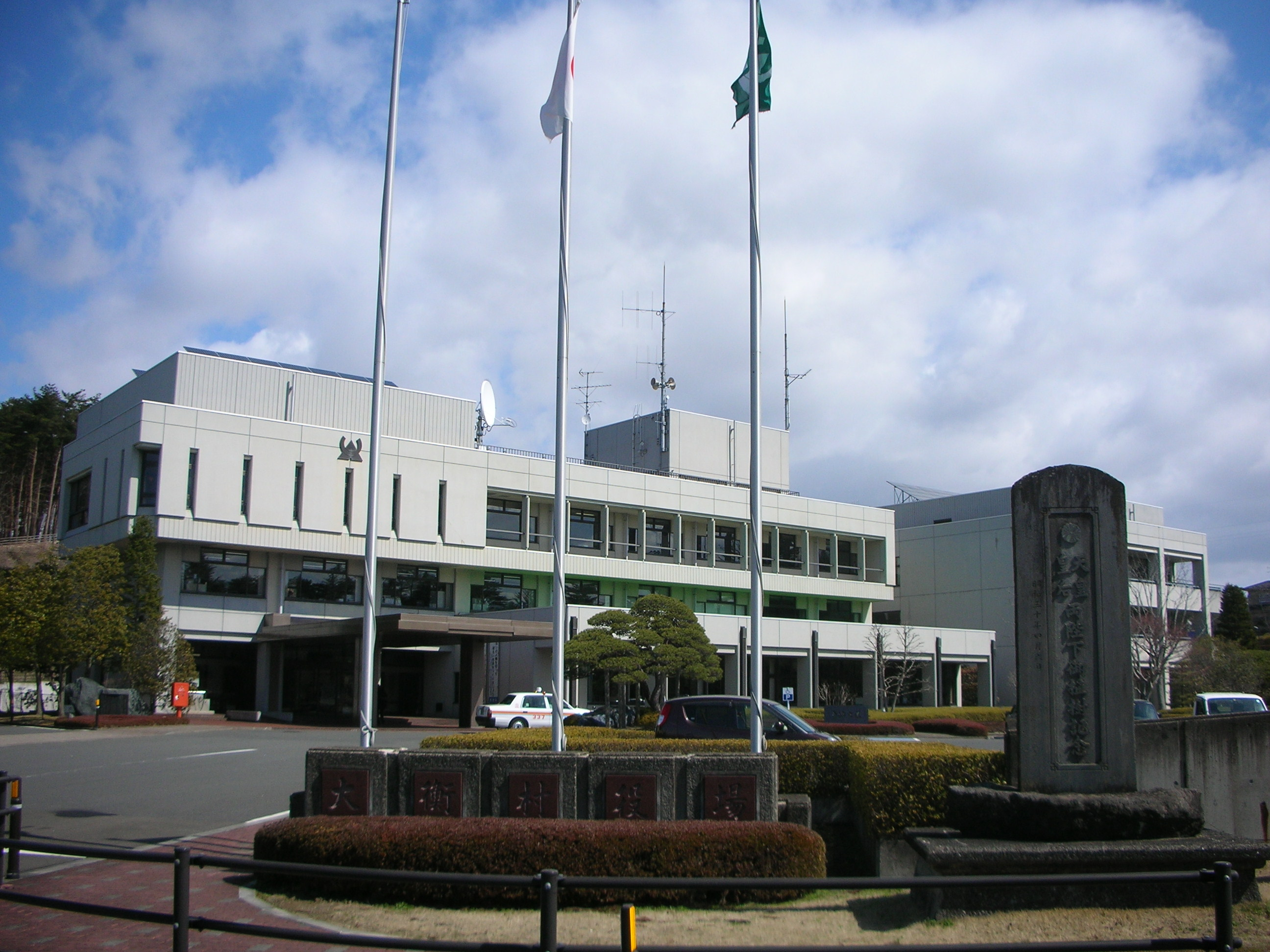
Ōhira Village Office

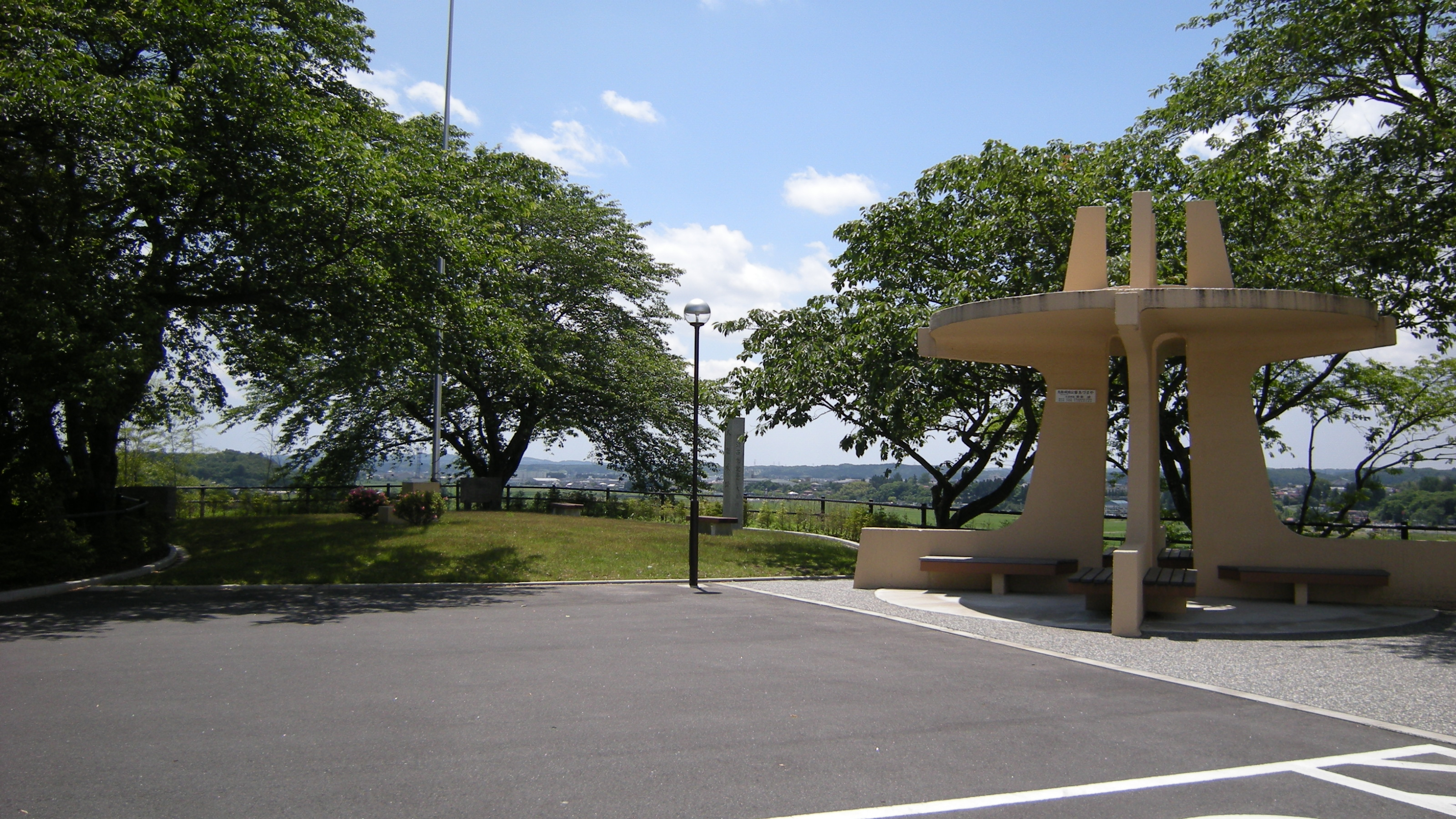
Site of Ōhira Castle

Ōhira (大衡村, Ōhira-mura) is a village located in Miyagi Prefecture, Japan. As of 31 May 2020, the village had an estimated population of 5,918, and a population density of 98 persons per km^{2} in 2108 households. The total area of the village is 60.32 square kilometres (23.29 sq mi).

== Geography ==
Ōhira is located near the geographic centre of Miyagi Prefecture, north of Sendai.

=== Neighboring municipalities ===
Miyagi Prefecture

- Ōsaki
- Ōsato
- Shikama
- Taiwa

=== Climate ===
The village has a climate characterized by cool summers and long cold winters (Köppen climate classification Cfa). The average annual temperature in Ōhira is 11.4 °C (52.5 °F). The average annual rainfall is 1,315.4 mm (51.79 in) with September as the wettest month. The temperatures are highest on average in August, at around 23.5 °C (74.3 °F), and lowest in January, at around 0.2 °C (32.4 °F).

Climate data for Ōhira (1991−2020 normals, extremes 1976−present)
| Month | Jan | Feb | Mar | Apr | May | Jun | Jul | Aug | Sep | Oct | Nov | Dec | Year |
|---|---|---|---|---|---|---|---|---|---|---|---|---|---|
| Record high °C (°F) | 14.8 (58.6) | 18.4 (65.1) | 24.5 (76.1) | 30.3 (86.5) | 34.2 (93.6) | 33.7 (92.7) | 36.7 (98.1) | 37.1 (98.8) | 36.8 (98.2) | 28.7 (83.7) | 23.8 (74.8) | 21.6 (70.9) | 37.1 (98.8) |
| Mean daily maximum °C (°F) | 4.2 (39.6) | 5.3 (41.5) | 9.4 (48.9) | 15.9 (60.6) | 21.0 (69.8) | 24.0 (75.2) | 27.1 (80.8) | 28.6 (83.5) | 24.9 (76.8) | 19.3 (66.7) | 13.2 (55.8) | 7.0 (44.6) | 16.7 (62.0) |
| Daily mean °C (°F) | 0.2 (32.4) | 0.7 (33.3) | 3.9 (39.0) | 9.4 (48.9) | 14.8 (58.6) | 18.7 (65.7) | 22.2 (72.0) | 23.5 (74.3) | 19.8 (67.6) | 13.8 (56.8) | 7.6 (45.7) | 2.5 (36.5) | 11.4 (52.6) |
| Mean daily minimum °C (°F) | −3.6 (25.5) | −3.5 (25.7) | −1.2 (29.8) | 3.3 (37.9) | 9.3 (48.7) | 14.4 (57.9) | 18.8 (65.8) | 20.0 (68.0) | 15.8 (60.4) | 8.8 (47.8) | 2.4 (36.3) | −1.5 (29.3) | 6.9 (44.4) |
| Record low °C (°F) | −13.8 (7.2) | −14.6 (5.7) | −11.3 (11.7) | −5.3 (22.5) | 0.1 (32.2) | 5.1 (41.2) | 10.3 (50.5) | 11.0 (51.8) | 4.4 (39.9) | −1.9 (28.6) | −6.0 (21.2) | −13.7 (7.3) | −14.6 (5.7) |
| Average precipitation mm (inches) | 60.5 (2.38) | 44.7 (1.76) | 79.6 (3.13) | 88.4 (3.48) | 110.2 (4.34) | 135.3 (5.33) | 186.2 (7.33) | 153.0 (6.02) | 181.2 (7.13) | 143.9 (5.67) | 67.4 (2.65) | 65.2 (2.57) | 1,315.4 (51.79) |
| Average precipitation days (≥ 1.0 mm) | 10.5 | 8.4 | 9.1 | 8.9 | 9.7 | 11.3 | 14.7 | 12.3 | 12.2 | 9.7 | 8.9 | 10.4 | 126.1 |
| Mean monthly sunshine hours | 125.7 | 147.3 | 174.6 | 190.2 | 188.0 | 138.2 | 122.4 | 133.2 | 121.1 | 139.0 | 128.2 | 108.8 | 1,724.8 |
Source: Japan Meteorological Agency

== Demographics ==
Per Japanese census data, the population of Ōhira has remained relatively stable over the past 70 years.

Historical population
| Year | Pop. | ±% |
|---|---|---|
| 1920 | 2,912 | — |
| 1930 | 3,268 | +12.2% |
| 1940 | 3,744 | +14.6% |
| 1950 | 6,112 | +63.2% |
| 1960 | 6,551 | +7.2% |
| 1970 | 5,028 | −23.2% |
| 1980 | 5,200 | +3.4% |
| 1990 | 5,885 | +13.2% |
| 2000 | 5,992 | +1.8% |
| 2010 | 5,334 | −11.0% |
| 2020 | 5,849 | +9.7% |

== History ==
The area of present-day Ōhira was part of ancient Mutsu Province, and has been settled since at least the Jōmon period by the Emishi people. Per the Shoku Nihongi, following an earthquake in the year 715 AD, a large number of people migrated to this area from the southern Kantō region, forming numerous fortified settlements. During the Sengoku period, the area was contested by various samurai clans before the area came under the control of the Date clan of Sendai Domain during the Edo period, under the Tokugawa shogunate.

The village of Ōhira was created within Kurokawa District, Miyagi Prefecture after the Meiji restoration on April 1, 1889, with the establishment of the modern municipalities system.

== Government ==
Ōhira has a mayor-council form of government with a directly elected mayor and a unicameral village of 11 members. Ōhira, together with the rest of Kurokawa District and the city of Tomiya collectively contributes two seats to the Miyagi Prefectural legislature. In terms of national politics, the village is part of Miyagi 4th district of the lower house of the Diet of Japan.

== Economy ==
The economy of Ōhira is largely based on agriculture, primarily the cultivation of rice. Toyota opened a new assembly plant in Ōhira on February 17, 2011, its first new plant in Japan in 18 years. The plant, (belonging to Central Motors), employing 900 people, assembles the Toyota Yaris and Corolla for both the domestic market and North America, with a capacity of 120,000 vehicles a year.

== Education ==
Ōhira has one public elementary school and one public junior high school operated by the village government. The village does not have a high school.

== Transportation ==
=== Railway ===
Ōhira does not have any passenger railway service.

=== Highway ===
- Tōhoku Expressway - Ōhira IC
- National Route 4
- National Route 47
- National Route 457

== Local attractions ==
- Site of Ōhira Castle
- Ōhira Hachiman Jinja

== Notable people ==
- Tomiko Satō
