= Dima =

Dima or DIMA may refer to:

== Acronym ==
- Department of Immigration and Multicultural Affairs (1996–2001), Australian federal government agency
- Department of Immigration and Multicultural Affairs (2006–2007), Australian federal government agency
- DIMA (database), Domain Interaction Map database
- Dong-ah Institute of Media and Arts, in Korea

== People ==
- Dimitrij Ovtcharov (born 1988), German table tennis player
- Dima Al Kasti (born 2001), Lebanese footballer
- Dima Bilan (born 1981), Russian pop artist
- Dima Kash (born 1989), Russian-born singer-songwriter and rapper based in Twin Cities, Minnesota
- Dima Grigoriev (born 1954), mathematician
- Dima Hamdan (born 1975), Palestinian filmmaker and journalist
- Dima Kandalaft (born 1979), Syrian actress and singer
- Dima Orsho (born 1975), Syrian soprano
- Dima Wannous (born 1982), Syrian writer and translator
- Dima Khatib (born 1971), journalist, poet and translator
- Dima Tahboub (born 1976), writer, political analyst, member of Jordan's Muslim Brotherhood
- Dima Trofim (born 1989), Romanian singer, dancer, actor, and former member of the LaLa band
- Dima al-Wawi (born 2003), youngest Palestinian prisoner in Israeli jails
- Dima, a diminutive of the eastern Slavic first name Dmitry
- Dima, a diminutive of the Russian male first name Avudim
- DIMA, an alias of French electronic artist Vitalic

== Places ==
- Dima, Burkina Faso, a village in Banwa Province, Burkina Faso
- Dima, Ethiopia (disambiguation), several places that share the name
- Dima, Spain, a town in northern Spain
- Dima Sara, a village in Gilan Province, Iran
- Dimapur, India ("-pur" means "city")

== Other uses ==
- Dima (album), an album by Algerian R&B singer Zaho
- Dima (beetle), a click beetle genus
- Dima language, a Papuan language of New Guinea
- "Dima", a baby woolly mammoth specimen

== See also ==
- Dimas (disambiguation)
- Dina (disambiguation)
- Dimasa (disambiguation)
- Dyna
