= Dimas (surname) =

Dimas (Greek: Δήμας) is a Greek, Portuguese and Spanish surname derived from the biblical Saint Dimas. It is the surname of:

- Angger Dimas (born 1988), Indonesian electronic musician.
- Christos Dimas (born 1980), Greek politician.
- Emanuel Dimas de Melo Pimenta (born 1957), Brazilian musician and architect.
- Eva Dimas (born 1973), Salvadoran weightlifter.
- Irma Dimas (born 1986), Salvadoran model and beauty queen.
- José Romão Dimas (born 1930), Portuguese association footballer.
- Pedro Dimas (born 1934), Mexican musician and composer.
- Pyrros Dimas (born 1971), Greek weightlifter.
- Stavros Dimas (born 1941), Greek politician, government minister and European commissioner.
- Trent Dimas (born 1970), American Olympic gymnast.

== See also ==
- Dimas (disambiguation)
