= Toyota P engine =

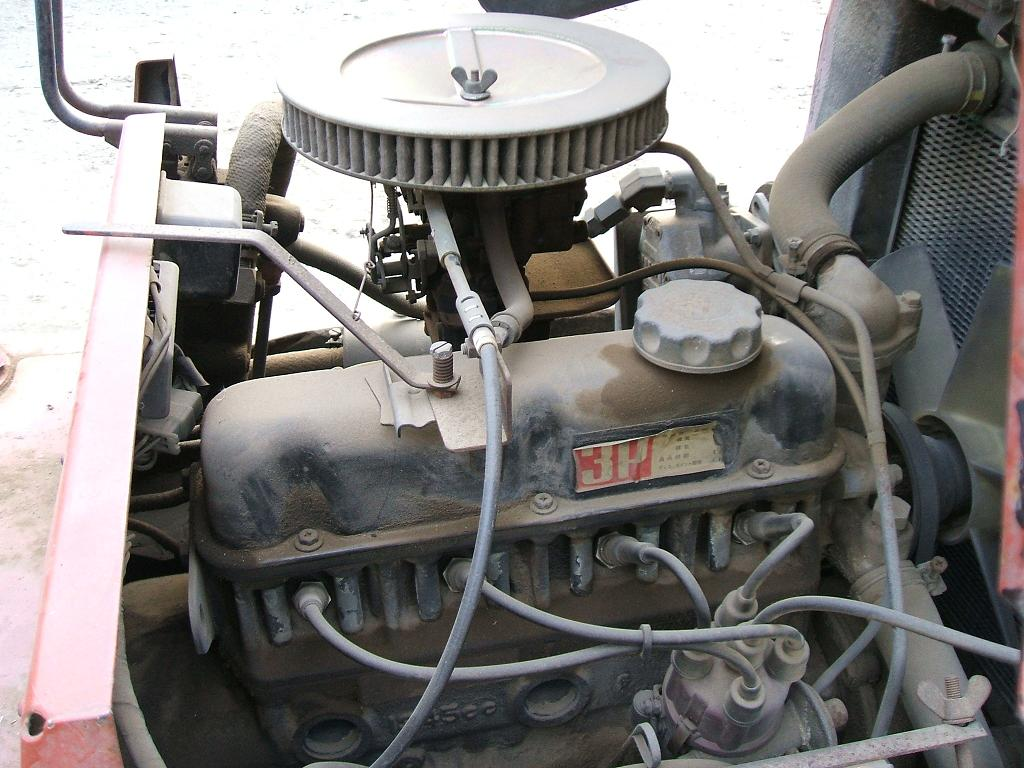

Overview
- Manufacturer: Toyota
- Production: 1959–1994

Layout
- Configuration: Inline-four
- Displacement: 1.0 L (997 cc); 1.2 L (1,198 cc); 1.3 L (1,345 cc); 1.5 L (1,493 cc)
- Cylinder bore: 69.9 mm (2.75 in); 76.6 mm (3.02 in)
- Piston stroke: 65 mm (2.56 in); 73 mm (2.87 in); 81 mm (3.19 in)
- Valvetrain: OHV

Combustion
- Fuel type: Gasoline
- Cooling system: Water-cooled

Output
- Power output: 28–65 PS (21–48 kW; 28–64 hp)
- Torque output: 8.8–10.3 kg⋅m (86–101 N⋅m; 64–75 lb⋅ft)

The Toyota P engine is a family of overhead valve inline-four engines produced from October 1959 through 1994 by Toyota. Originally fitted to the Corona passenger car, it was soon relegated to commercial use vehicles, and for its latter two decades it mostly powered various forklifts.

== P ==
The 1.0 L (997 cc) P was produced from 1959 through 1961. Bore and stroke are 69.9 mm × 65 mm (2.75 in × 2.56 in).

- 1959–1961 Toyota ToyoAce PK20, 45 PS (33 kW; 44 hp)

== 2P ==
The 1.2 L (1,198 cc) 2P was produced from 1961 through 1972. This was bored out to 76.6 mm (3.02 in), while retaining the short 65 mm (2.56 in) stroke. Power is 55 PS (40 kW; 54 hp) at 5,000 rpm, while torque is 8.8 kg⋅m (86 N⋅m; 64 lb⋅ft) at 2,800 rpm.

- 1961– Toyota ToyoAce PK30/31, 55 PS (40 kW; 54 hp)
- 1962–1964 Toyota Coronaline Van/Pickup PT26
- 1964–1967 Toyota Corona PT40/PT46

== 3P ==
The 1.3 L (1,345 cc) 3P was produced from 1967 through 1979. Bore and stroke is 76.6 mm × 73 mm (3.02 in × 2.87 in). Power is usually 65 PS (48 kW; 64 hp) at 5,000 rpm, with torque of 10.3 kg⋅m (101 N⋅m; 75 lb⋅ft) at 3,000 rpm.

- 1967–1970 Toyota Corona PT41/PT47
- 1970–1973 Toyota Corona Van PT86V
- 1967–1971 Toyota ToyoAce PK32
- 1971– Toyota ToyoAce PY10
- Toyota "Seven" shovel SG7 (700 kg (1,500 lb)), 28 PS (21 kW; 28 hp)

== 4P ==
The 1.5 L (1,493 cc) 4P (retaining the 76.6 mm (3.02 in) bore but with a longer 81 mm (3.19 in) stroke) mostly saw use in off-road equipment such as forklifts and loaders, where it was used until at least 1994 for the Toyota 5FGL. It produces 30 PS (22 kW; 30 hp) at 2400 rpm as fitted to the Toyota 2SGK6 loader (1993). In the 1972 2FG20 2-ton forklift it has 35 PS (26 kW; 35 hp) at 2800 rpm.

== See also ==
- List of Toyota engines
