= Dimas =

Dimas can refer to:

- Saint Dismas, also known as Saint Dimas - the Good Thief at Jesus's crucifixion
- Dimas (surname), Greek, Portuguese and Spanish surname.
- Dimas Delgado (born 1983), Spanish footballer
- Dimas Gonçalves de Oliveira (born 1984), Brazilian footballer
- Dimas Teixeira (born 1969), Portuguese footballer
- Al-Dimas, a town in Syria

== See also ==
- Dima (disambiguation)
