= Dimasa =

Dimasa may refer to the following entities in Northeast India :

- Dimasa people, a group of people in present Assam and Nagaland states
- Dimasa language, also called Dimasa-Kachari or Dima-basa, their Sino-Tibetan language
- Dimasa Kingdom, early precursor of the Kachari Kingdom in Medieval Assam
- Dima Hasao district, district of Assam in India

== See also ==
- Dima (disambiguation)
- Dimaraji, proposed state of the Dimasa people in northeastern India
- Busu Dima, festival of the Dimasa people
