= Toyota ToyoAce =

Light to medium cab over truck

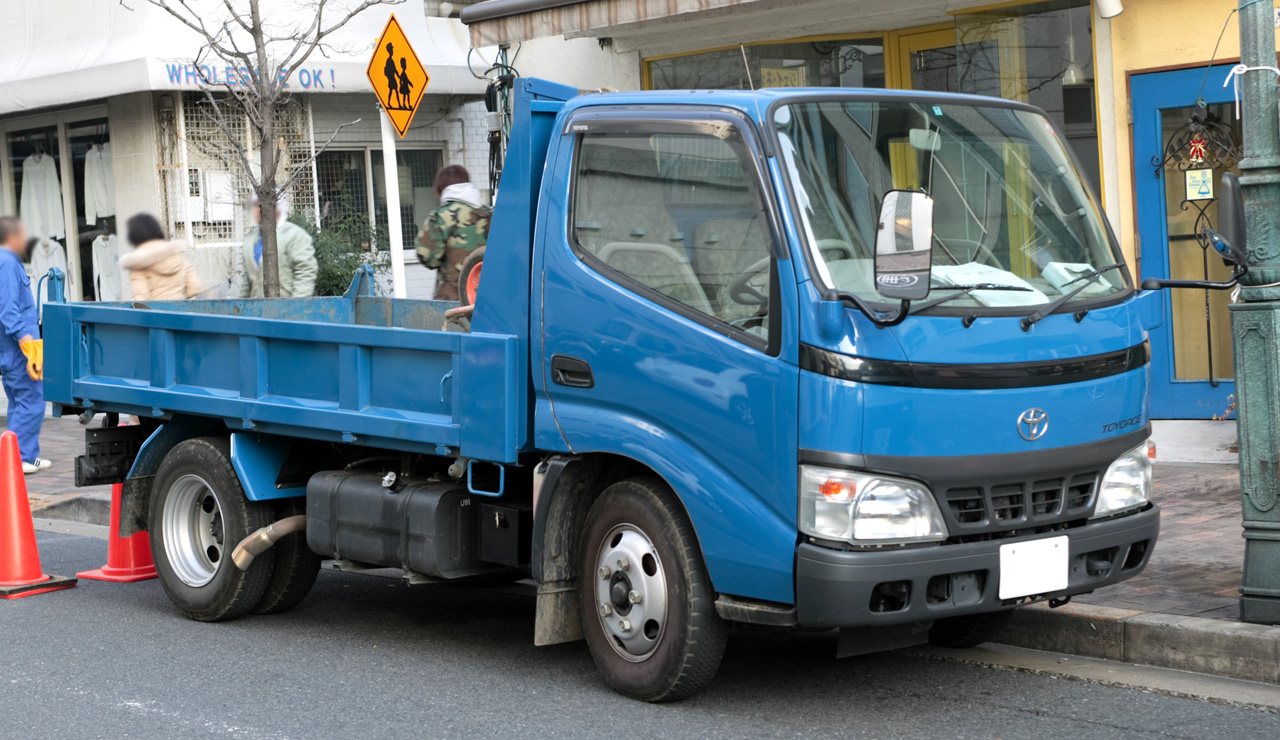

Overview
- Manufacturer: Toyota Motor Corporation; Hino Motors, Ltd.
- Also called: Toyopet Light Truck SKB; Toyota Dyna; Daihatsu Delta; Hino 300 Series/200 Series
- Production: September 1954 – March 2020
- Assembly: Honsha plant, Toyota City, Japan

Body and chassis
- Class: Truck
- Body style: Truck (standard cab, crew cab)

Chronology
- Successor: Toyota Dyna; Toyota QuickDelivery (Step van)

The Toyota ToyoAce (Japanese: トヨタ・トヨエース) is a light to medium cab over truck built by Toyota since September 1954. Until a renaming contest in 1956, the truck was sold as the "Toyopet Light Truck SKB". Since 1985 the ToyoAce and Dyna truck lines have been merged, with the Dynas generally being intended for heavier duty work. In Japan, it was exclusive to Japanese Toyota dealerships called Toyopet Store.

== First generation ==
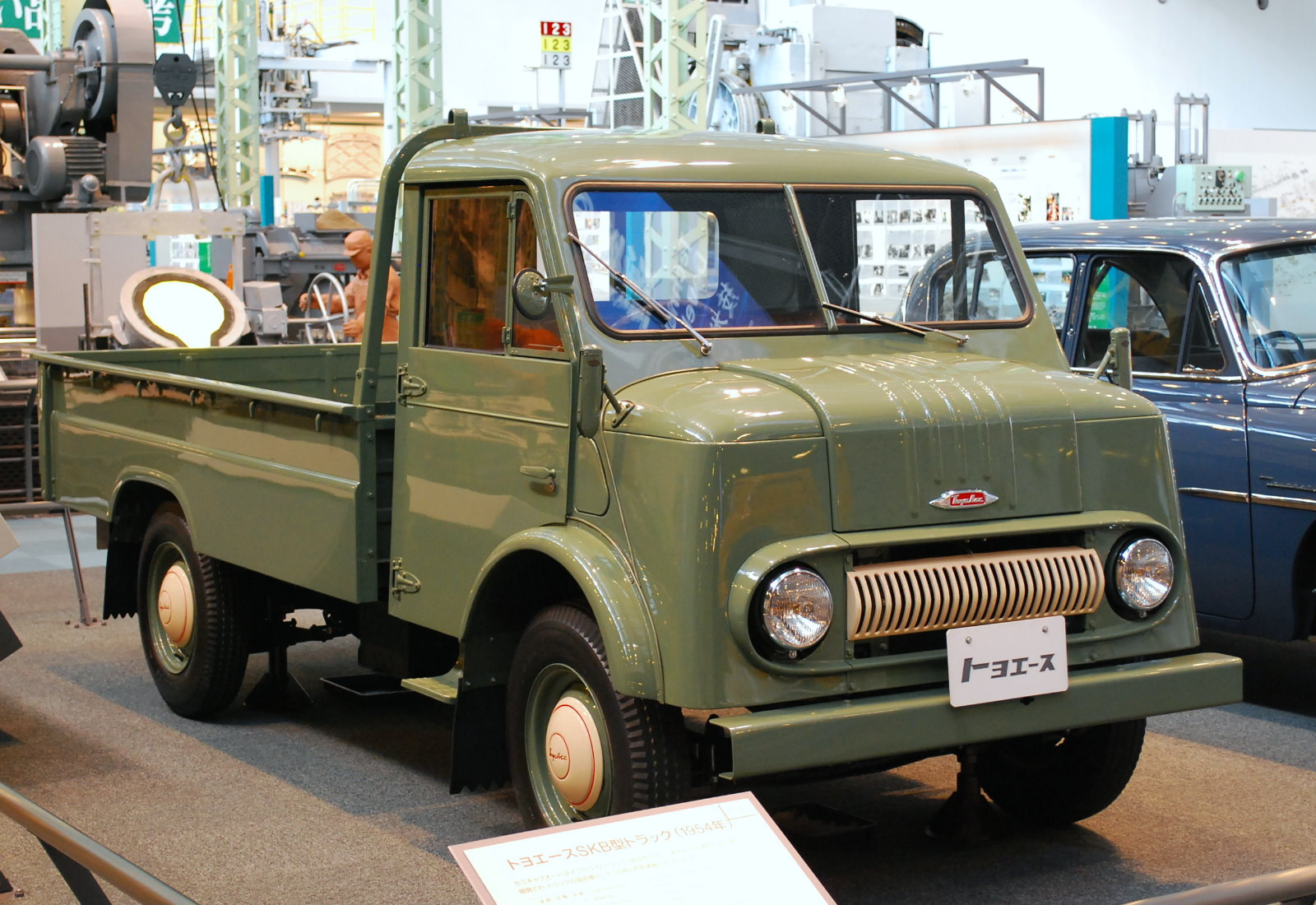
1956 Toyopet ToyoAce

The first-generation ToyoAce was a one-ton truck of a semi-cab over design. It has a four-cylinder sidevalve inline-four "type S" engine of 1.0 L (995 cc) and 30 PS (22 kW). It was originally sold as the "Toyopet Light Truck", a not very inspired name which was changed for "ToyoAce" after a public contest in 1956. The spartan interior featured hammock-style seats, as in a Citroën 2CV. The "K" in the model code was shared, as was the chassis, with the Toyopet SK/RK Truck, a line which was later to become the Toyota Stout. The first Toyoace initially sold slowly, due to a price much higher than the three-wheeled trucks with which it was competing. After a large drop in price, however, the ToyoAce went on to change the Japanese market for light trucks in favor of four-wheeled vehicles.

There were also panel van, light van, double cab and other body styles developed. These received chassis numbers from SK17 to SK19. In 1958 power of the S engine was increased to 33 PS (24 kW). The former Central Motors produced the ToyoAce van from June 1956 to July 1960.

== Second generation ==
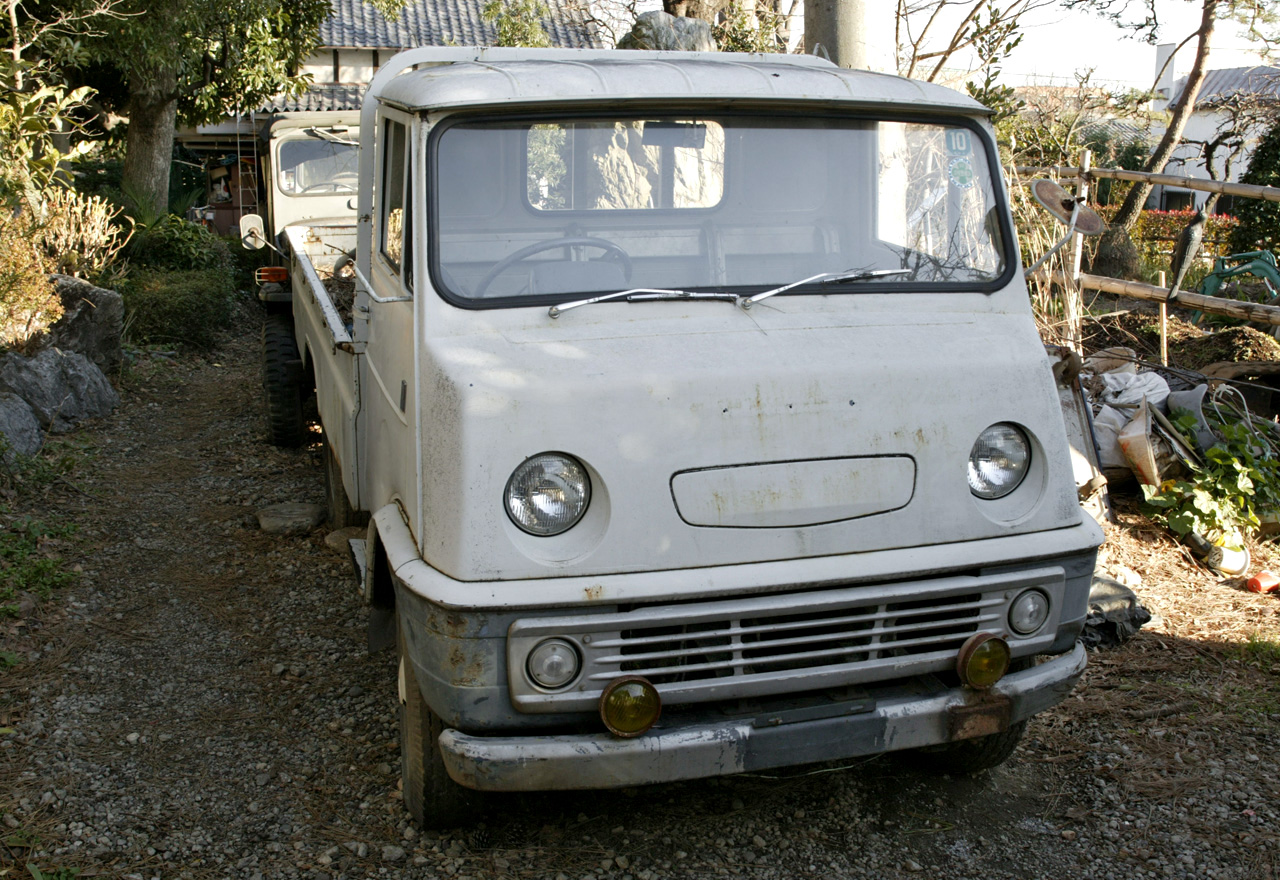
Toyopet ToyoAce PK3#

The semi-cab over layout was retained for the second-generation Toyopet ToyoAce, initially sold as the SK20. The new SK20 was also sold as a panel van (SK20V) and as a double-cab truck (SK20P). The sidevalve 1 liter engine's power remained 33 PS (24 kW), as for its predecessor. It was introduced in March 1959, but already by October that year it underwent a facelift and received a new engine, the 1.0-liter 45 PS (33 kW) P type. This was the PK20 series. Australian versions were badged as a Toyota 25. Later yet, 1.25 and 1.5 ton versions were added, with more powerful 1.2 (2P) and 1.5-litre (R) engines. This picture is a PK3# with two single lights, the upgrade added in 1966 was the PK4# series which was fitted with the R engine. After the initial S-engined series, there were only PK models even though they were being powered both by the P and R series engines. This was to set it apart from the Stout which used the "RK"-series chassis numbers. In a May 1967 facelift, the car received quad headlights and a 3P-engined (1.35 L, "PK32") version was added.

Unlike the front-engined SKB, the engine in the second-generation ToyoAce was moved, to underneath and behind the seats. This allowed seating for three rather than two. The cabin also tilted for engine access. The split windshield was replaced with a single unit, still flat. This ToyoAce had a long life, remaining on the market until 1971.

== Third generation ==
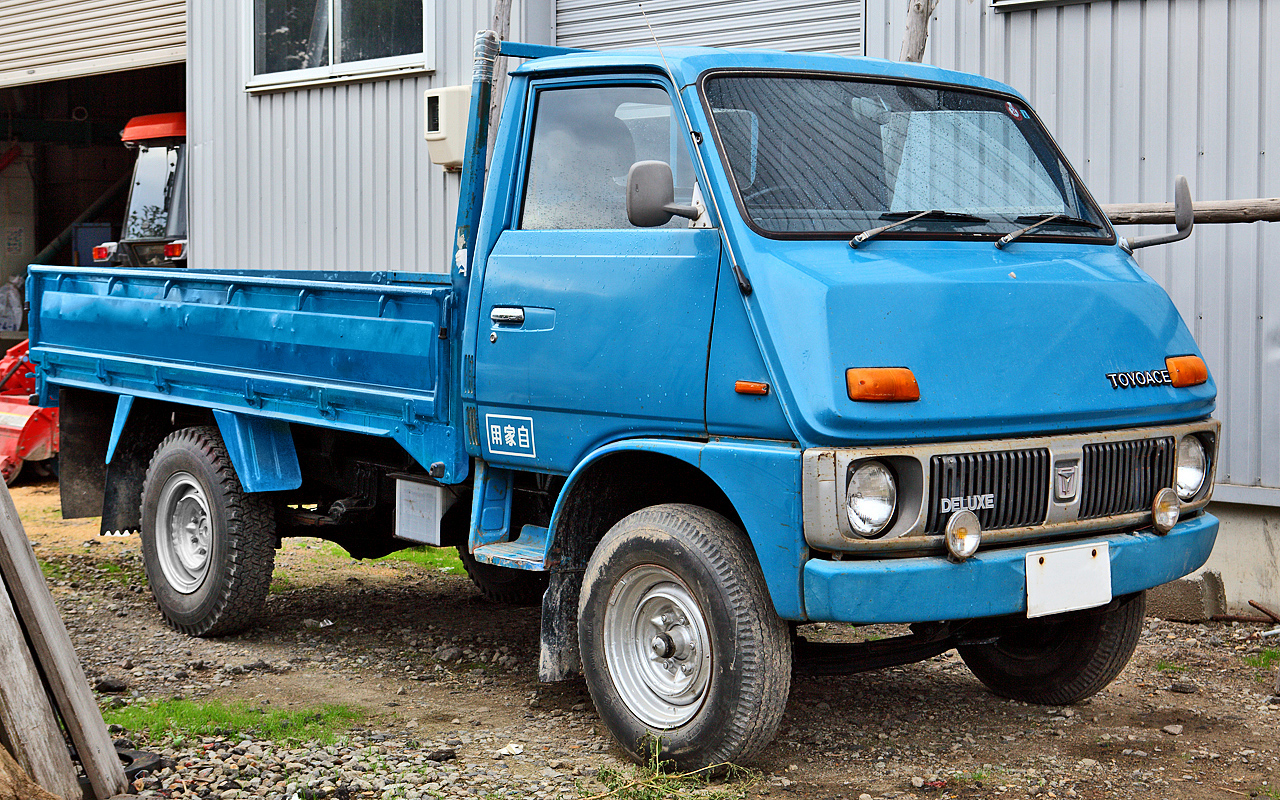
Third-generation ToyoAce

The third-generation ToyoAce received Y-series chassis codes to avoid confusion with the Toyota Stout, which kept the K-series chassis codes. It was introduced in August 1971 and had a much more modern design, and was available in several new body styles. There were 3P type and 12R gasoline engines (1.35 or 1.6 litres, 83 PS or 61 kW from the 12R) as well as the 2.5-litre 2J diesel engine with 70 PS (51 kW). The diesel was introduced in July 1972. Payloads now ranged between 850 and 2,000 kg (1,870 and 4,410 lb). In August 1977 a special "just low" version appeared, with small twin rear wheels for a lower cargo surface.

Starting with this generation, the ToyoAce was used as the basis of a commercial van to accommodate passengers for commuting, called the Toyota HiAce, which was sold at Toyota Japanese dealerships called Toyopet Store, thereby affording Toyota the ability to sell the ToyoAce as a smaller companion to the Toyota Coaster.

Model codes include PY10, RY10/12/14, and JY16.

== Fourth generation ==
The fourth-generation ToyoAce was built between March 1979 and August 1985. This was the last ToyoAce to be of a separate design from the larger Dyna. While the overall size and cargo area was similar to those of the Y10-series, the wheelbase was 345 mm (13.6 in) shorter to allow for a narrower turning circle. The new ToyoAce also met new more stringent emissions and noise standards introduced for 1979. The 1.6-litre 12R was retained, although power was down somewhat to 80 PS (59 kW). The 2J diesel also remained, but was complemented by the all new L type, a 2.2-liter SOHC unit with 72 PS (53 kW). There was also a bigger 2-litre 5R petrol engine available, but diesels were now beginning to become more important in this sector. The amount of diesel versions increased from seven to 25, as opposed to twenty petrol models.

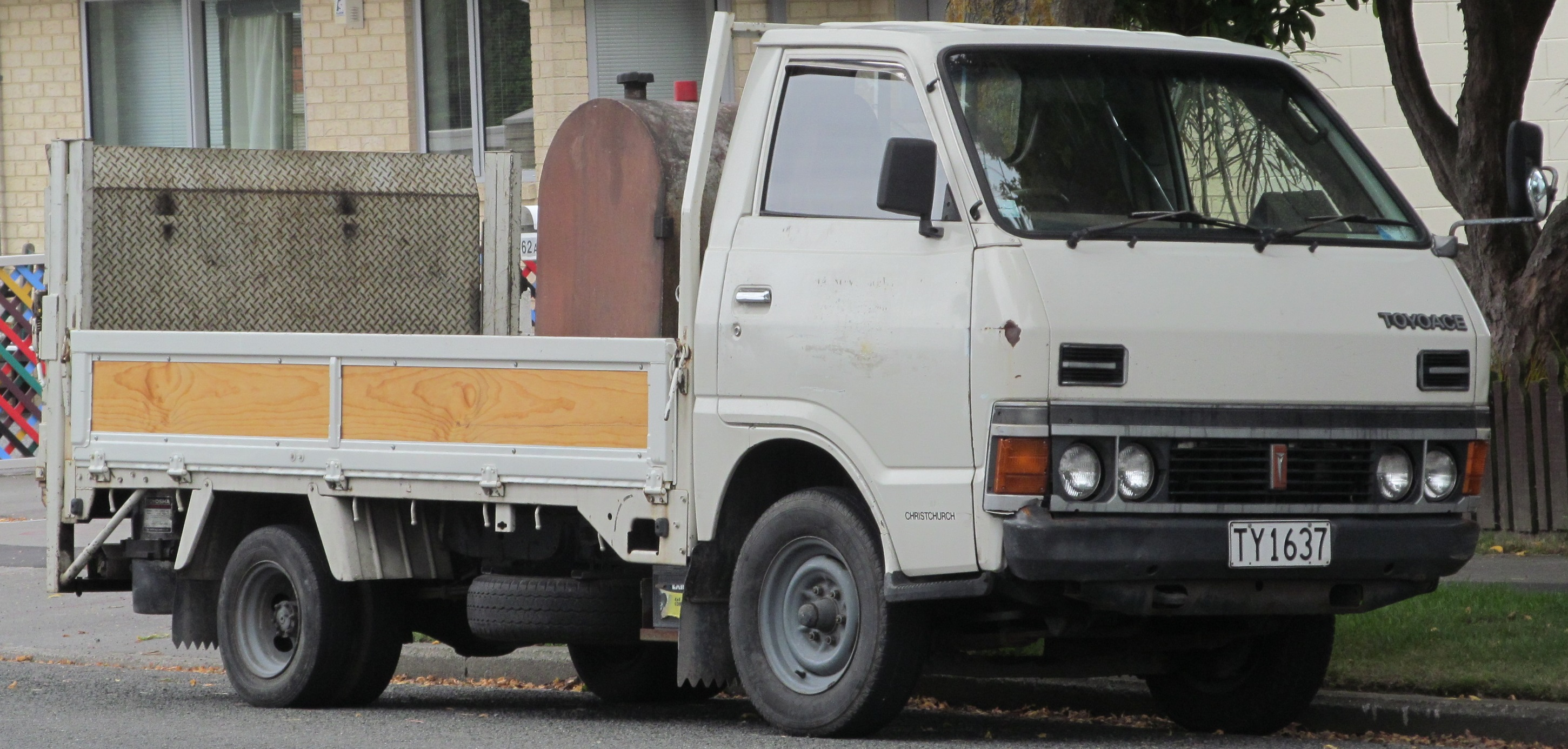
Toyota ToyoAce (fourth generation)

In 1982, a delivery van that allowed passengers to walk upright within the vehicle was introduced, called the Toyota QuickDelivery which is popular with delivery services and industries where working from inside the vehicle and mobility are an asset.

Model codes include RY20, LY20, LY30, JY30 and Y40. A long-wheelbase version was also available.

== Fifth generation ==
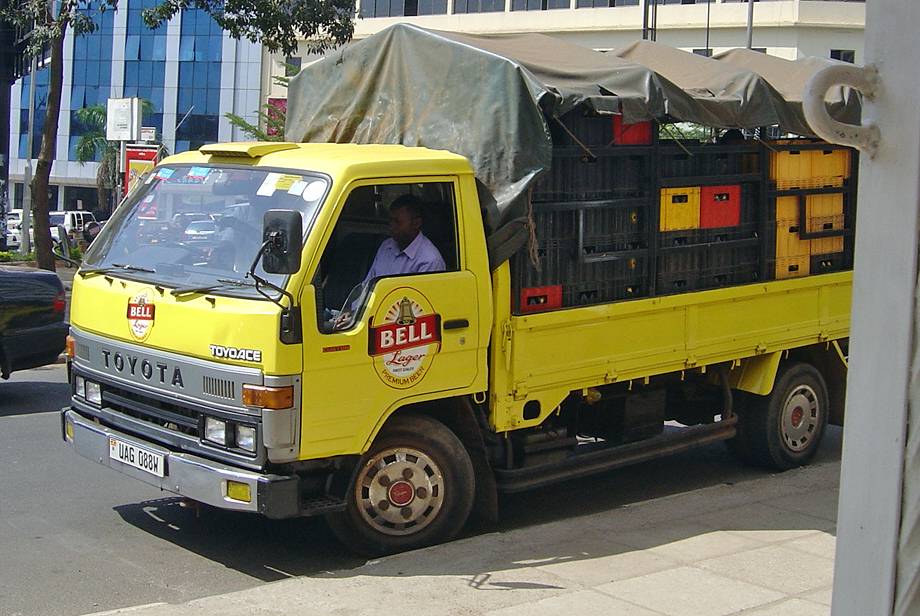
Fifth-generation ToyoAce

Introduced in August 1985, the fifth-generation ToyoAce was based on the fifth-generation Dyna, which had been launched a year earlier. The ToyoAce models were generally for lighter duty and are offered with smaller engines, down to the 1,626 cc 1Y petrol unit. Models in the 1.5 ton range (called G15) had Y-series chassis codes (Y50/60), while the heavier duty 2–3.5 ton versions have the U-series codes of the Dyna (U80/90, marketed as the ToyoAce G25 and G35). The one-tonner was discontinued, with the HiAce truck taking its position in the market. There was now also the option of an LPG-powered two-litre engine, and the expanded diesel range now went up to a four-litre six.

== Sixth generation ==
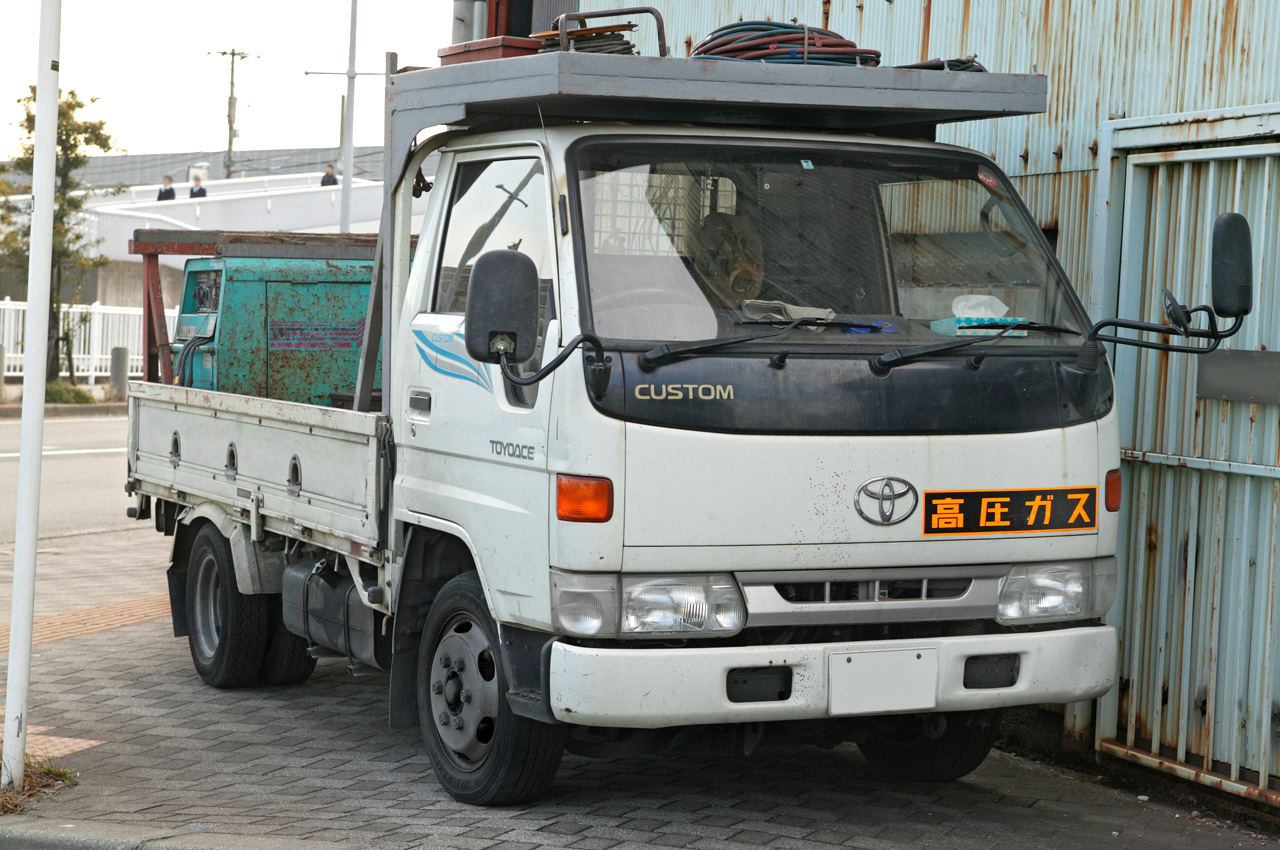
Sixth generation Toyota ToyoAce

The sixth-generation (introduced in May 1995) was merged fully with the Dyna, still with Y-series chassis numbers for the lighter models and U-series for the heavier versions. The only difference between the Dyna and the ToyoAce from now on is the badging, and that they are sold through separate sales channels. The range expanded again, now also including a wide-bodied rebadging of the Hino Ranger FB. The lighter portion of the range remained on the market until 2001, two years after the heavier versions had been replaced.

== Seventh generation ==
In May 1999 the heavier diesel versions (1.75-3.5 tons) were replaced by the new seventh-generation ToyoAce. A four-ton model was new to the ToyoAce lineup. In June 2001, the lighter models were also replaced by the seventh-generation model. These have narrower cabins than the heavier variants and accordingly have a different looking front grille.

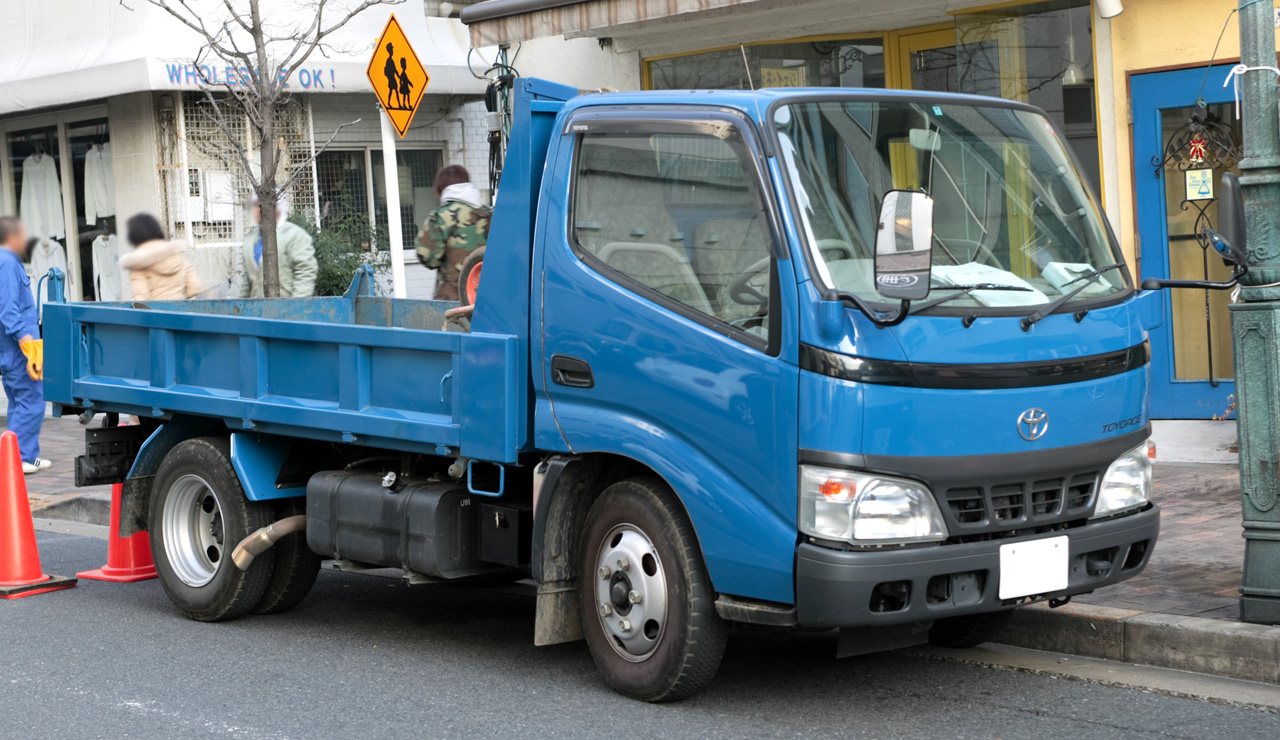
Heavier duty, wider-bodied model with a grille divided into four segments

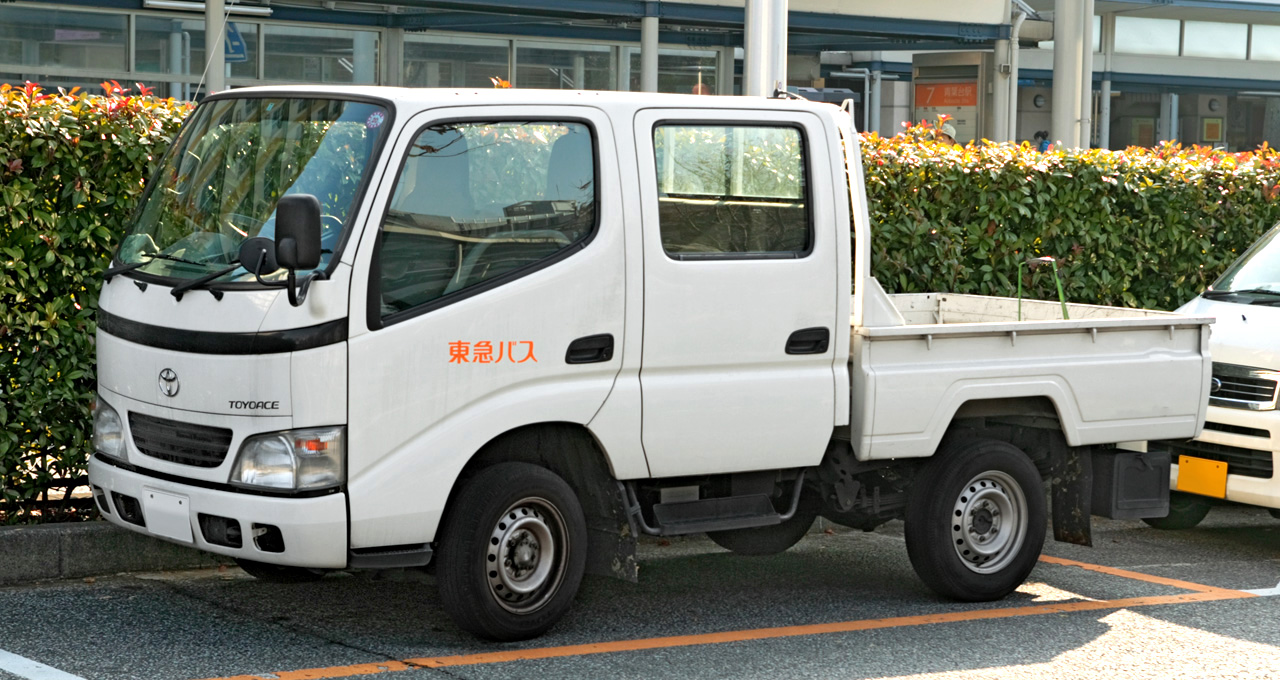
Double cab standard bed ToyoAce (TRY230; lighter duty variant)

== Eighth generation ==
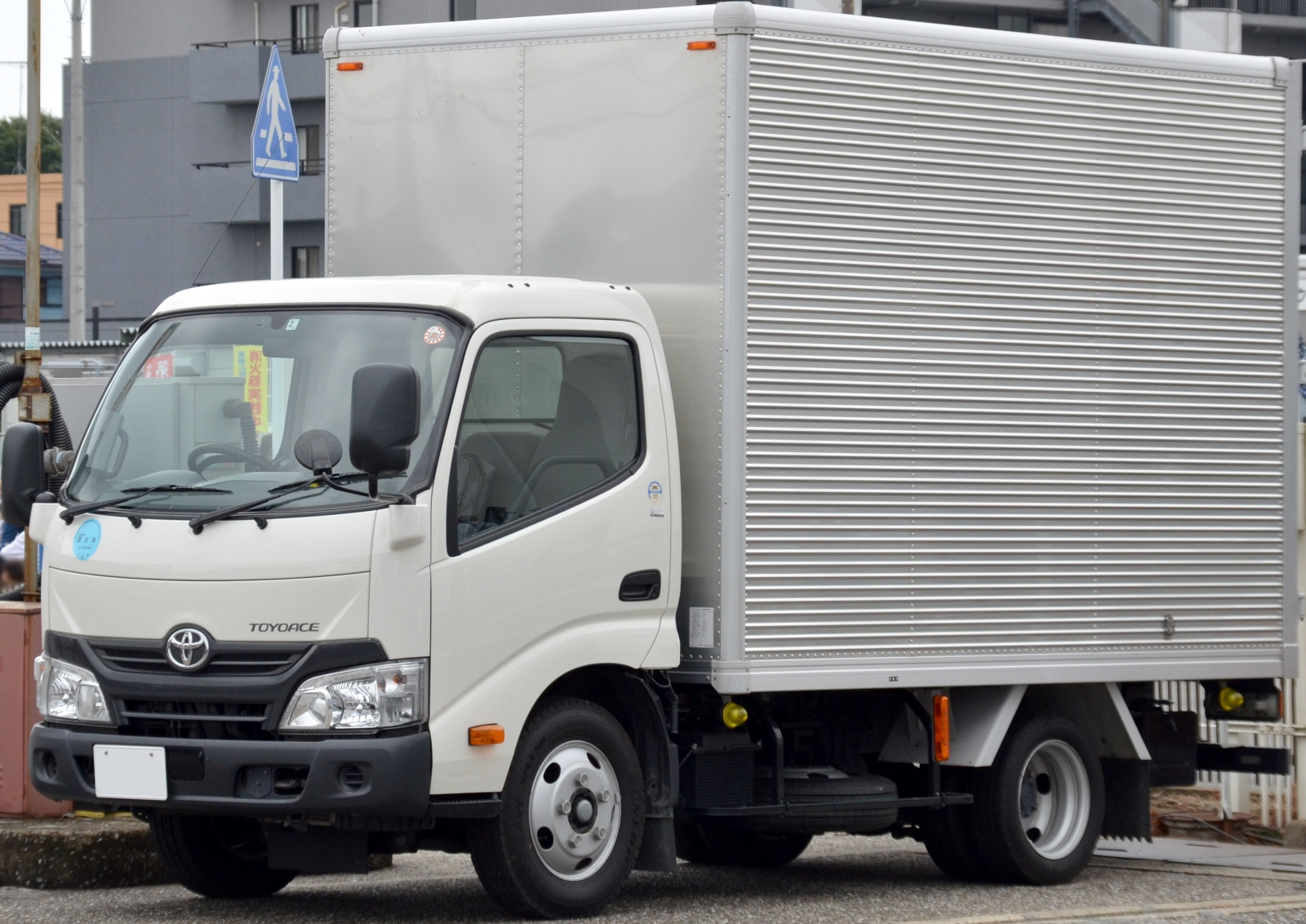
Eighth generation Toyota ToyoAce

In June 2011 the eighth-generation ToyoAce appeared, now featuring hybrid drive systems in several models.

The ToyoAce got a minor change at the front and received a collision avoidance system and a lane-departure alert system.
