= Toyota J engine =

The Toyota J is a series of overhead valve (OHV) diesel engines built by Toyota, mainly for truck applications, beginning in March 1964 and ending in 1983.

== J ==
The J is a 2.3 L (2,336 cc) inline-four, eight valve OHV diesel engine. It was introduced in March 1964. Bore and stroke is 88.0 by 96.0 mm, the compression ratio is 18.5 : 1. Output is 65 PS (48 kW) at 3,600 rpm.

Applications

- Toyota Dyna JK170
- Toyota Light Bus JK170B

== 2J ==
The 2J is a 2.5 L (2,481 cc) inline-four, eight valve OHV diesel engine. Output is 70 PS (51 kW) at 3600 rpm as fitted to a 1972 Toyoace truck. It was first introduced in 1969 and was built until 1983. Later versions claim 75 PS (55 kW) at the same engine speed.

Applications

- Toyota ToyoAce JY16
- Toyota 700kg Shovel Loader SD7 (50 PS)
