= Toyota Dyna =

Medium-duty truck manufactured by Toyota

Dyna
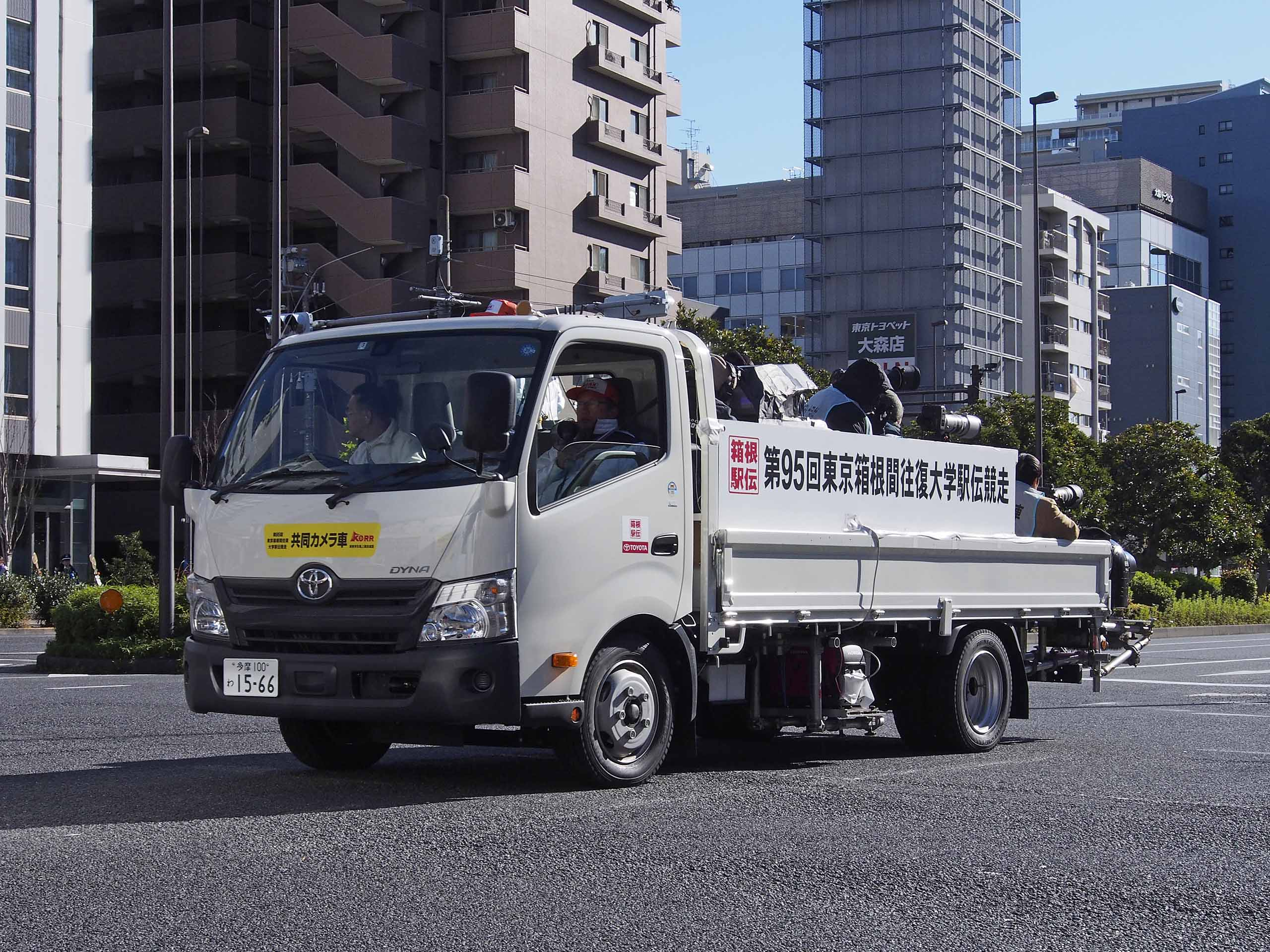
- Toyota Dyna Hybrid (XZU700-series, Japan)

Overview
- Manufacturer: Toyota Motor Corporation; Hino Motors, Ltd.; Kuozui Motors
- Also called: Daihatsu Delta; Hino Dutro/300 Series/200 Series; Toyota ToyoAce; Hino Ranger 2/3; Hino Innovator/Expert (Thailand)
- Production: 1959–present
- Assembly: Japan: Toyota City (Honsha plant); Japan: Hamura (Hino Motors); Japan: Kariya (Toyota Auto Body); Japan: Yokosuka (Kanto Auto Works); Japan: Hashima (Gifu Auto Body); Japan: Kakamigahara (Gifu Auto Body); Taiwan: Zhongli; Portugal: Ovar; Indonesia: Purwakarta; Philippines: Canlubang; Thailand: Samut Prakan

Body and chassis
- Class: Medium-duty truck
- Body style: 2-door standard cab; 4-door crew cab; 2-door wide cab; 5-door van
- Layout: Front-engine, rear-wheel-drive; Front-engine, four-wheel-drive
- Platform: Toyota R (1959–1968); Toyota U (1968–present)
- Related: Toyota Coaster

Powertrain
- Transmission: 4-speed manual; 5-speed Aisin Seiki manual; 6-speed Aisin AH15/AH16 manual; 4-speed Aisin Seiki automatic; 5-speed Aisin AW automatic

The Toyota Dyna (Japanese: トヨタ・ダイナ) is a light to medium-duty cab over truck for commercial use. In the Japanese market, the Dyna is sold alongside its twin called the Toyoace. The Toyoace was a renaming of the Toyopet SKB Truck as a result of a 1956 public competition with 200,000 entries. "Dyna" is short for dynamic.

The Dyna was originally available in Japan only at Toyota Diesel Store locations, then later available at Toyota Store locations, while the Toyoace twin was available at Toyopet Store locations. The Dyna is also sold as the Hino Dutro (300-series) and formerly as the Daihatsu Delta.

In Japan, its traditional competitors are the Isuzu Elf, the Mitsubishi Fuso Canter and the Nissan Atlas.

The former Central Motors produced the Dyna Route Van from April 1957 to June 1967.

== History ==
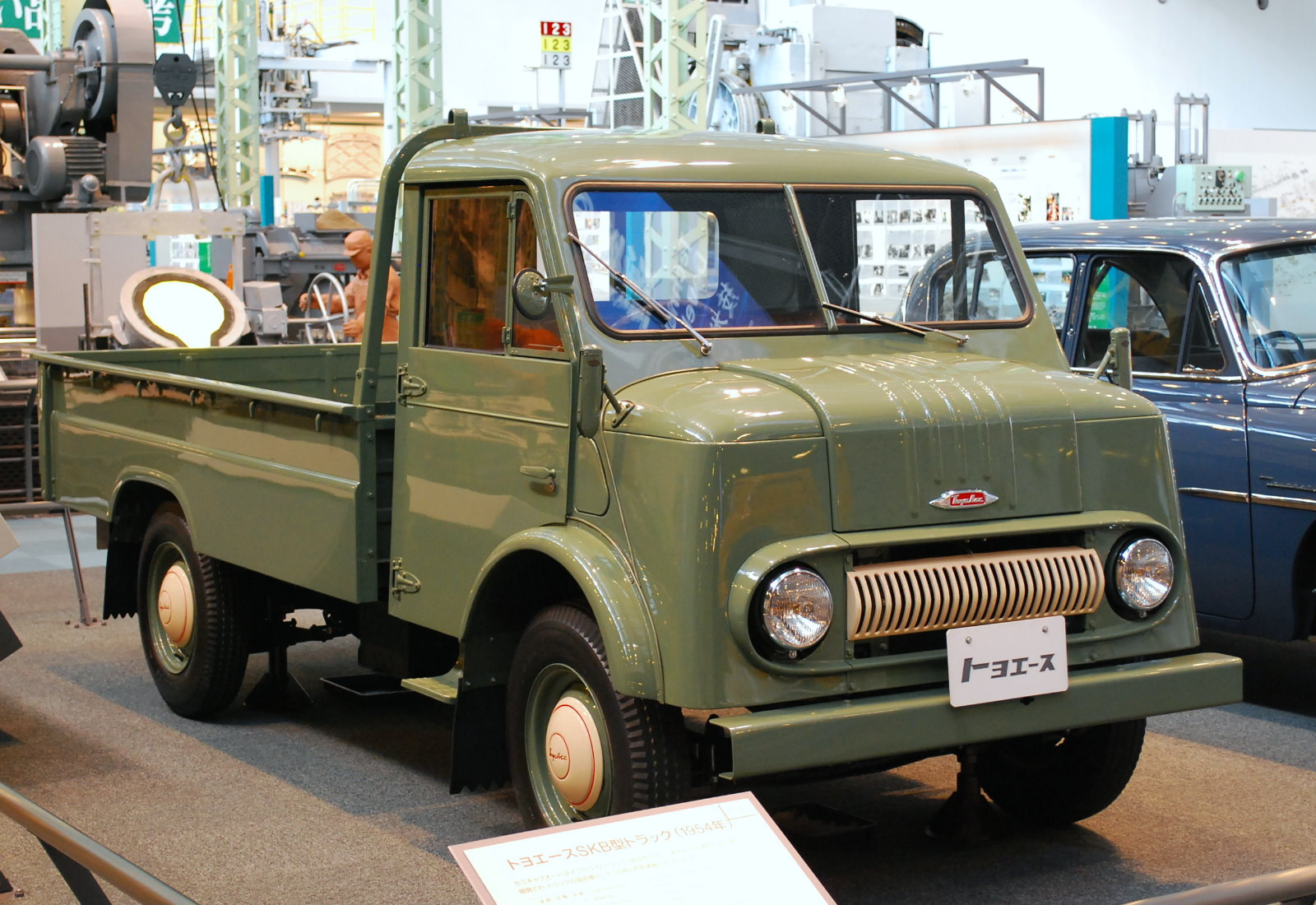
Toyopet Toyoace SKB first generation

=== RK52 ===
The Toyopet Route Truck RK52 was the contributing platform of the Dyna. A new Toyota Japanese dealership was established to sell the Toyopet Toyoace series SKB called Toyopet Store, which also introduced a sedan version of this platform called the Toyopet Master.

=== RK60 – RK80 ===
Second generation of Toyopet Route Truck, Designed by Kanto Auto Works, Ltd. The frame was shared with the Toyopet Masterline RK23 pickup truck and the Toyota Stout.

The Toyopet Route Truck was renamed as the Toyota Dyna in April 1959. Although it shared the same platform as the Toyoace, its appearance is more similar to its other derivative, the Daihatsu Delta.The K20 Series Toyoace was produced until the Y10 Series arrived. It was sold as Toyota PK25 Truck for the export market.

== K170 (1963–1968) ==
The original semi-cab over Dyna was replaced by the new model K170 series in September 1963, with a leaner design with quadruple headlights. The Dyna RK170 also provided the basis for the RK170B Toyota Light Bus, and was built on the chassis of the Stout. It also had the Stout's 1.9-litre 80 PS (59 kW) 3R-B engine. The Isuzu Elf was introduced in a diesel version in 1960, a version which proved successful enough to relegate the Dyna to second place in sales. Even the new Dyna didn't restore the Dyna's lead, until in March 1964 the J-engined (2,336 cc, OHV) diesel-engined JK170 was added to the lineup. A long wheelbase, 2.5-tonne (5,500 lb) version with twinned rear wheels was also available (RK175), as was a route van (glazed minivan) version.

== U10 (1969–1977) ==
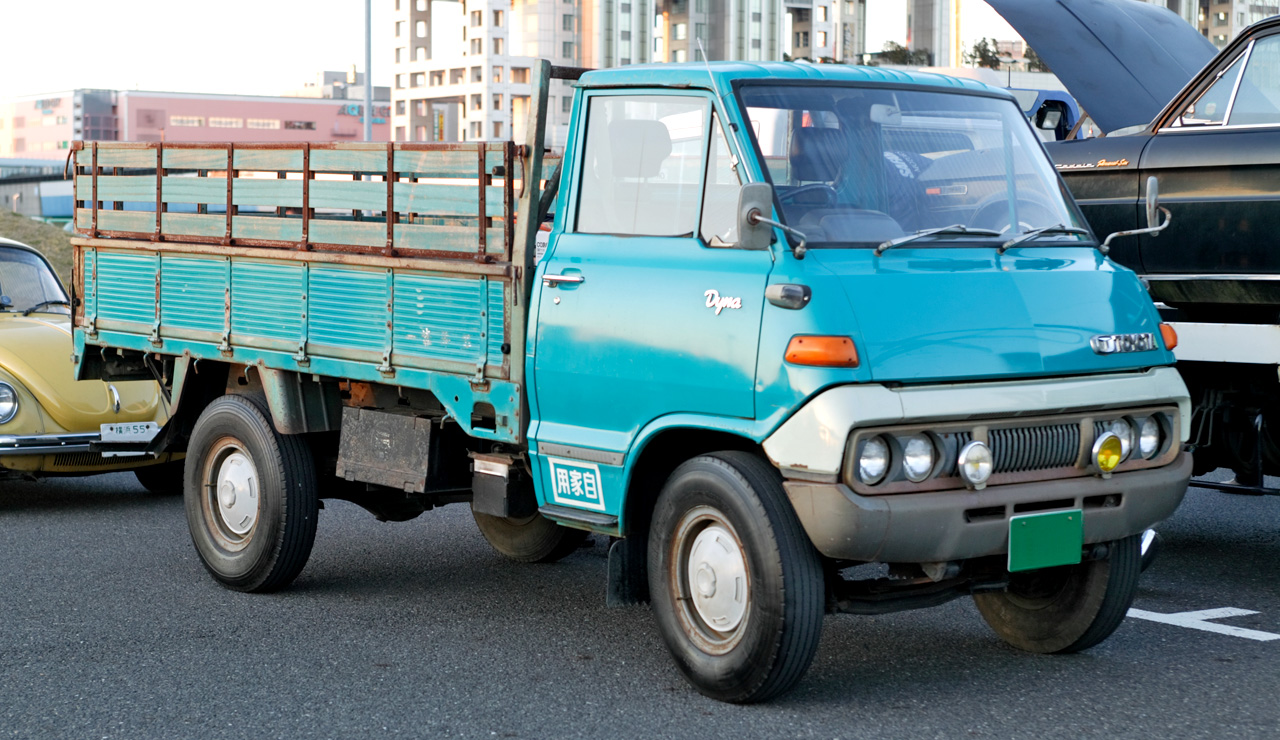
Toyota Dyna (RU10)

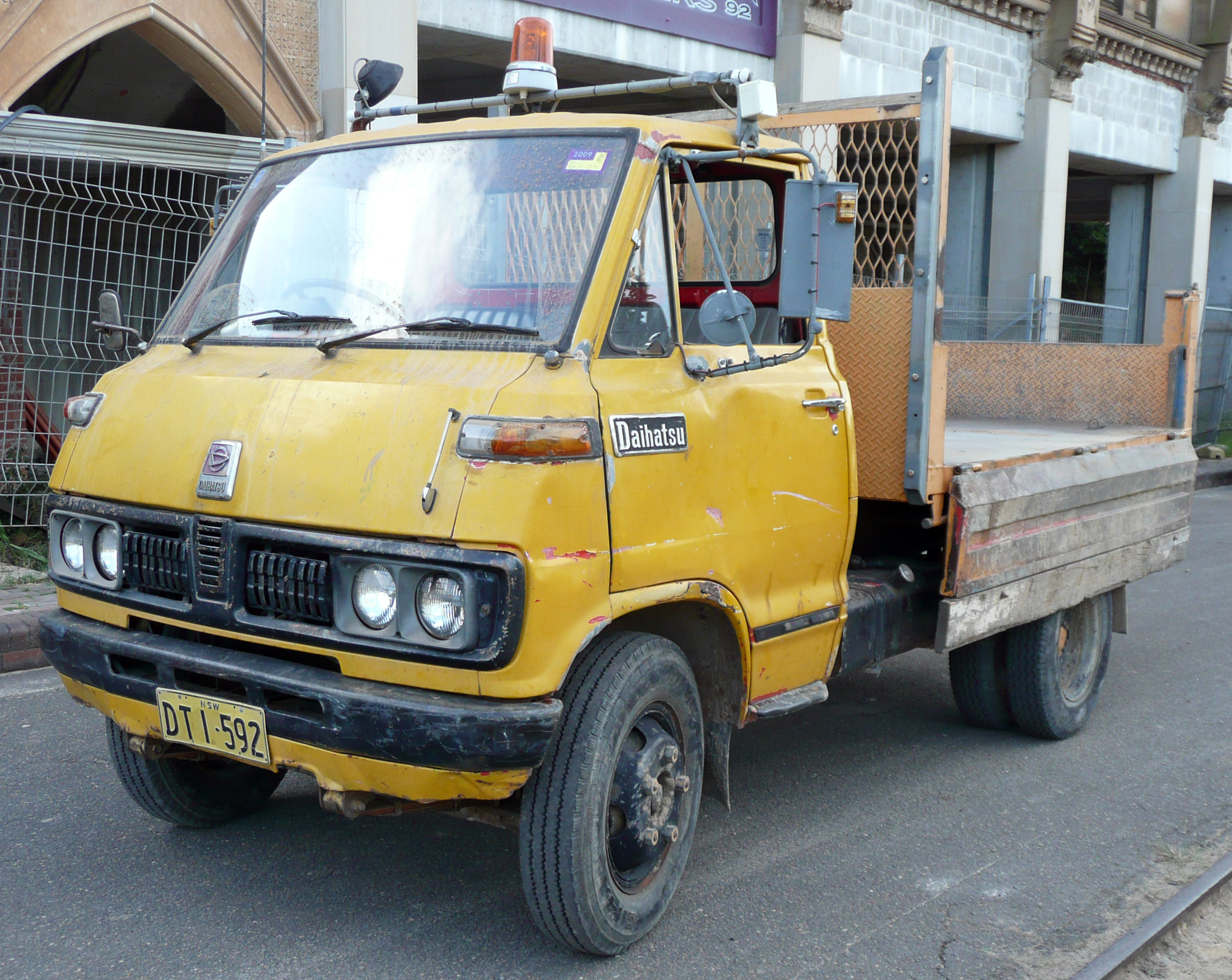
Daihatsu Delta, heavier-duty "2000" version

The Dyna platform was changed to the Toyota "U" platform after forming a business partnership with Daihatsu in 1967. The engines available for this series is either a 2.0-liter model 5R gasoline engine rated at 93 PS (68 kW), a 3.0-liter inline-four B, or the inline-six 3.6-liter model H diesel. The H diesel is rated at 95 PS (70 kW) and was only available in the heavier duty three-tonne truck version, which has a top speed of 100 km/h (62 mph). The B diesel offers 85 PS (63 kW).

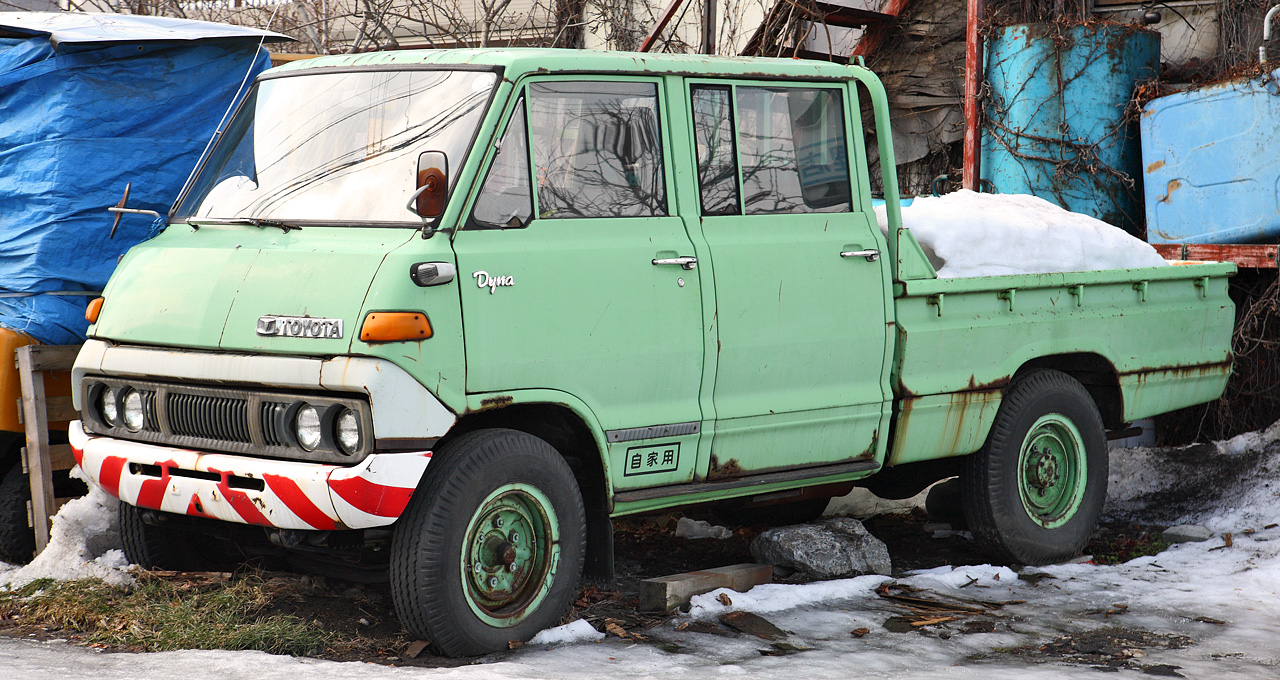
Toyota Dyna double cab in Japan.

The three-tonne Dyna was presented in August 1969. Short (U10-series) and long wheelbase trucks (U15-series), as well as route vans (minibus) were available. Fitted with the 2.0-liter 5R engine rated at 95 PS (70 kW), the Dyna was marketed in many export markets such as Australia as well, with single or twinned rear wheels.

The Toyota Coaster bus line had the same chassis and also used the U10-series chassis codes. A heavy duty version called the Toyota Massy Dyna was first introduced in September 1969.

=== Daihatsu Delta ===
A rebodied version of the U10 Dyna was also sold as the first-generation Daihatsu Delta 1500 or 2000, depending on the weight ratio. Chassis codes are SV17 for the 12R-engined Delta 1500, DV23 for the 5R petrol model (2000) and DV28 for the B-engined Delta 2000 diesel. The Delta 2000 was also available with a 2.5-litre Daihatsu DG diesel engine; this carries the DV26 chassis code. In Australia, there was also a 85 PS (63 kW) 1.9 L (1,861 cc) petrol inline-four engine available.

== U20 / Y20 Series ==
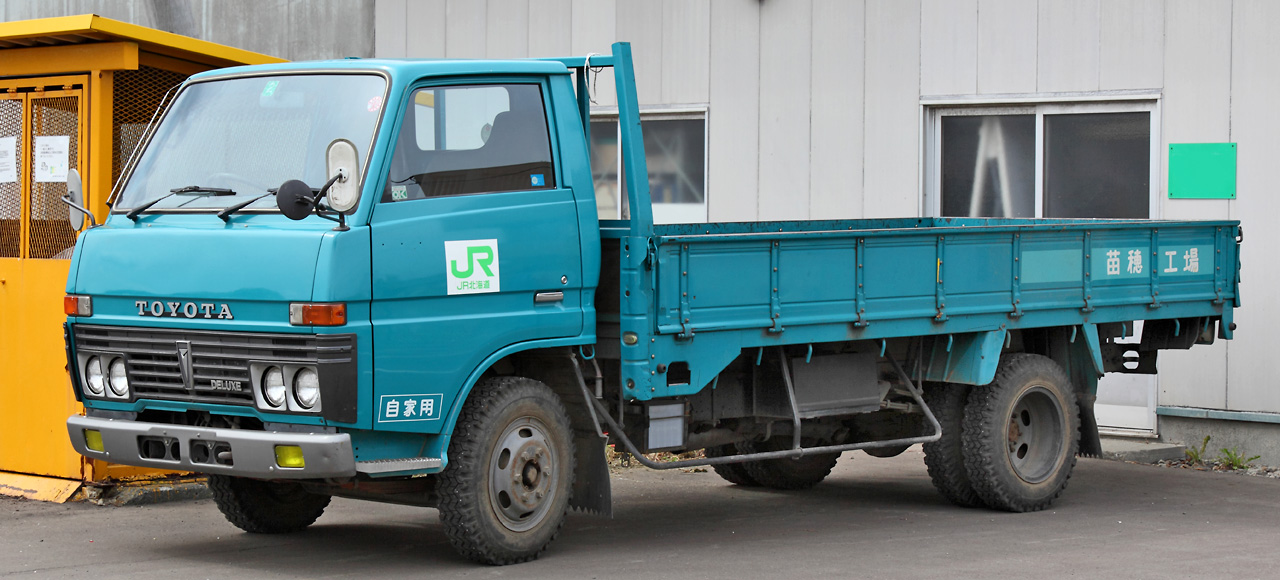
Toyota Dyna (RU30)

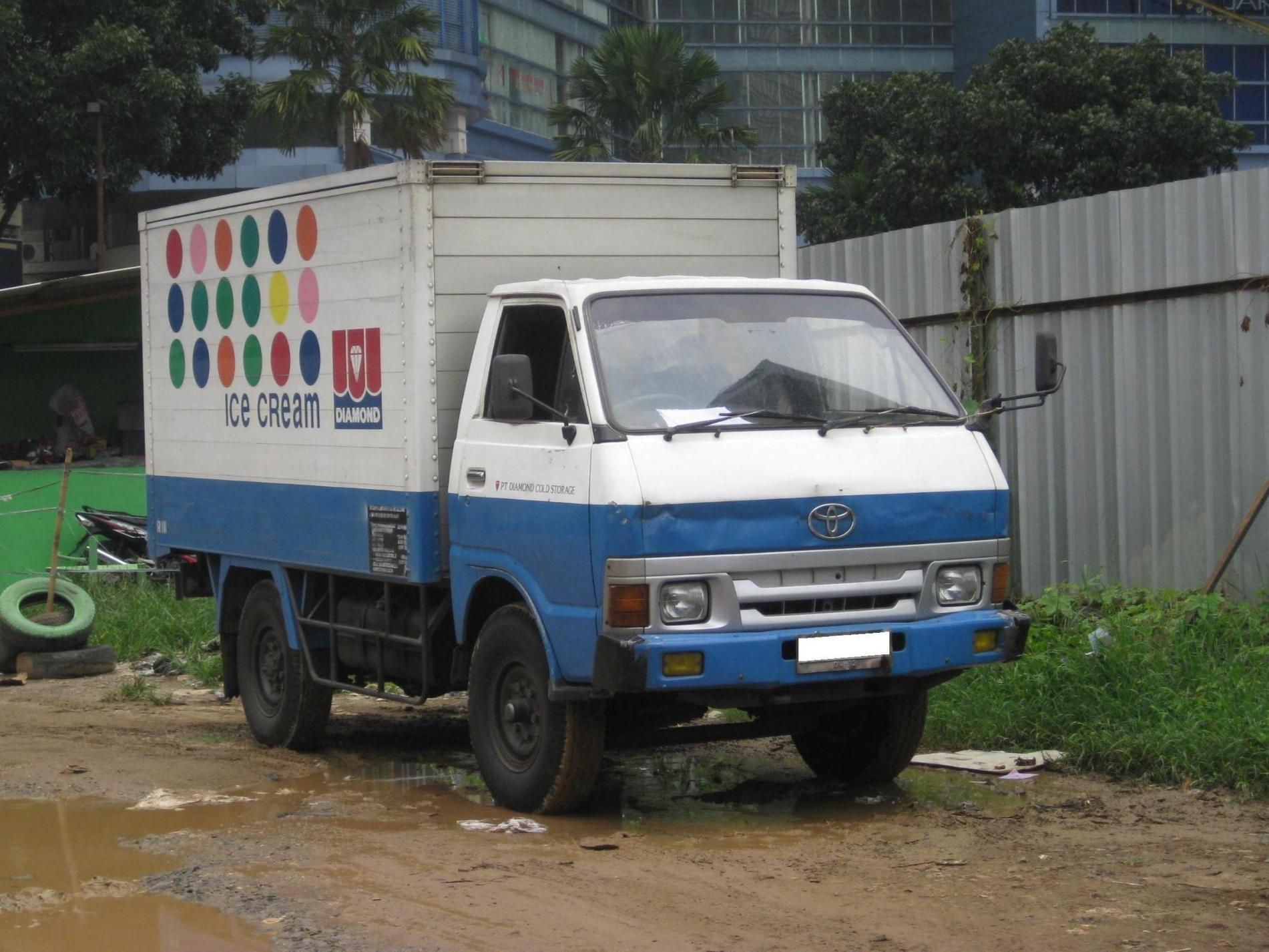
Toyota Dyna Rino (BY34, Indonesia)

=== 2 – 3 tonner ===
U20, U30, U40 & U50 Series (1977–1984)

The U20 is a four-wheel truck (this chassis code was also used for the Route Van), the U30 is a longer wheelbase version, while the heavier U40 and U50 have a wider cab. These models have twin rear wheels and mostly use Toyota's 3.0-liter Inline-four diesel B engine. The 2.0 L (1,994 cc) 5R petrol engine was also available in some markets, rated at 80 PS (59 kW).

As with predecessor, this model was also marketed as the Daihatsu Delta, although this one was the first to be sold with Hino badging - as the Ranger 2 or Ranger 3 depending on the weight rating in metric tons.

A version of this truck, with standard or crew cabs, entered production in China in 1983 as the Fuzhou FZ131. The Dyna-based FZ131 was to become a mainstay of Fuzhou Automobile Works' production through the 1980s with a production of 211 units, being succeeded by the next generation Dynas (still using the FZ131 name). Production ended in 1989 as they were lowering in sales and demand.

=== 1 – 1.5 tonner ===
Y20 – 40 Series (1979–1985)

The new smaller ToyoAce with Y20 chassis was launched in 1979, while the Dyna was still using the U-platform. This was the fourth-generation ToyoAce in Japan. In certain export markets, the ToyoAce was sold as Dyna, and offered in single and double cabin bodystyles.

=== Dyna Rino Y30 & Y40 Series (1984–2002) ===
In 1984, Toyota introduced the Dyna Rino in Indonesia. The light single rear wheel version was built on Y30 platform, and the twin rear wheel version was coded Y40. Early models have round headlights and 3.4-liter 3B and 13B engines. The facelift models with rectangular headlights, BU are powered by 3.7-liter 14B engines. The Indonesian market Dyna Rino remained in production until 2002.

=== Daihatsu Delta ===
This model was also sold as the Daihatsu Delta, in a range of 1.5 to 2.5 tonne payloads. The engines are Daihatsu's own 2.0-liter petrol and 2.5-liter diesel units. The second generation Delta went on sale in Australia at the end of December 1977.

== U60-U90 Series (1984-1994) / Y50-Y60 Series (1985-1995) ==
=== 1 – 1.5 tonner ===
Y50 and 60 Series (1985–1995)

The lighter Y Series was introduced in May 1985. Portugal's Salvador Caetano assembled the LY60 Dyna as the 150, using Toyota's 2L engine, a 2.4 L (2,446 cc) diesel inline-four.

=== 2 – 3.5 tonner ===
U60 – 90 Series (1984–1994)

The U60 - 90 series Dyna was released for the Japanese market in September 1984. In addition to the 3.0-litre B-type, 3.4-litre 13B and turbocharged 13B-T, and 4.0-litre 1W diesel engine, the 2.0-litre 3Y gasoline, and LPG-powered 3Y-P engines were also offered. New for this generation were the "full just-low" flat deck for easier and lower loading, passenger car-like floor transmission shift, and for the vehicle with the 1W diesel engine, the "one-touch super-shift mechanism which allowed to shift from economy to power drive. The first BU-series (Dyna 200/300/400, 1984–88) used quad round headlights.

From 1989 onwards, the Dyna had quad rectangular headlights and one piece door glass with new interior door trim and other minor interior changes. All wide cab models had a centrally mounted roof vent and had 3 windscreen wipers. The 3.4-litre 3B, 3.4-litre (direct injected) 13B and 3.7-litre 14B diesel engines with direct injection were used in the Dyna 200 and Dyna 300, a 5-speed gearbox was standard while a 4-speed automatic transmission with a 2-way overdrive mode was available as an option. The Dyna 300 was equipped with an exhaust brake. Front, ventilated twin piston disc brakes were optional on the first series wide cab Dyna 300. In Portugal, the 3B-engined Dyna 250 (BU84) was assembled locally.

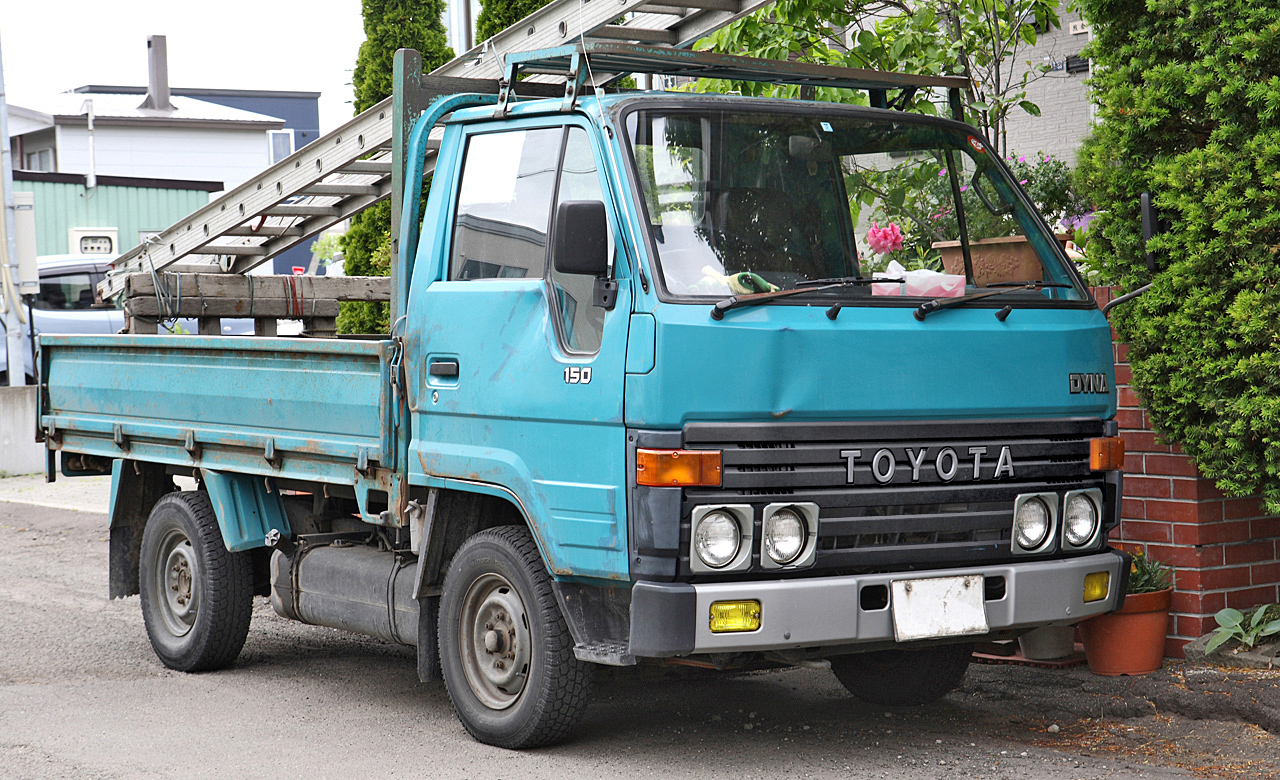
Pre-facelift Toyota Dyna 150 (Y50-series, Japan)

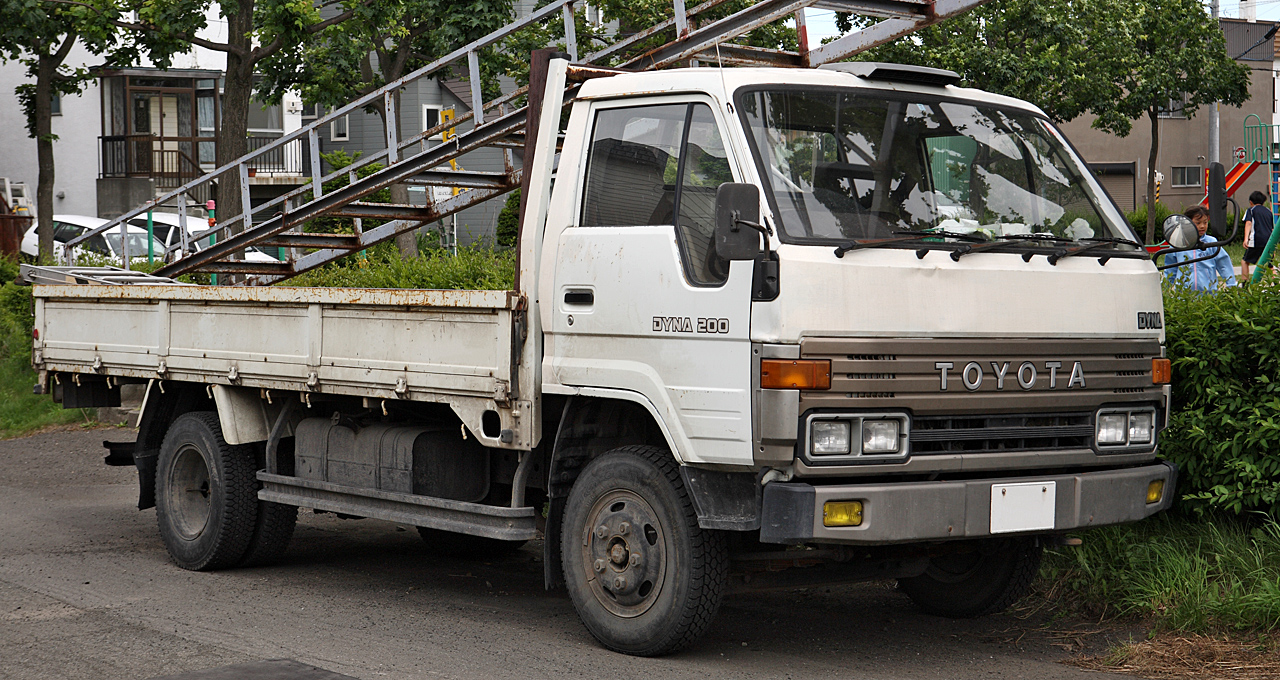
Facelift Toyota Dyna 200 wide cab (U60-series, Japan)

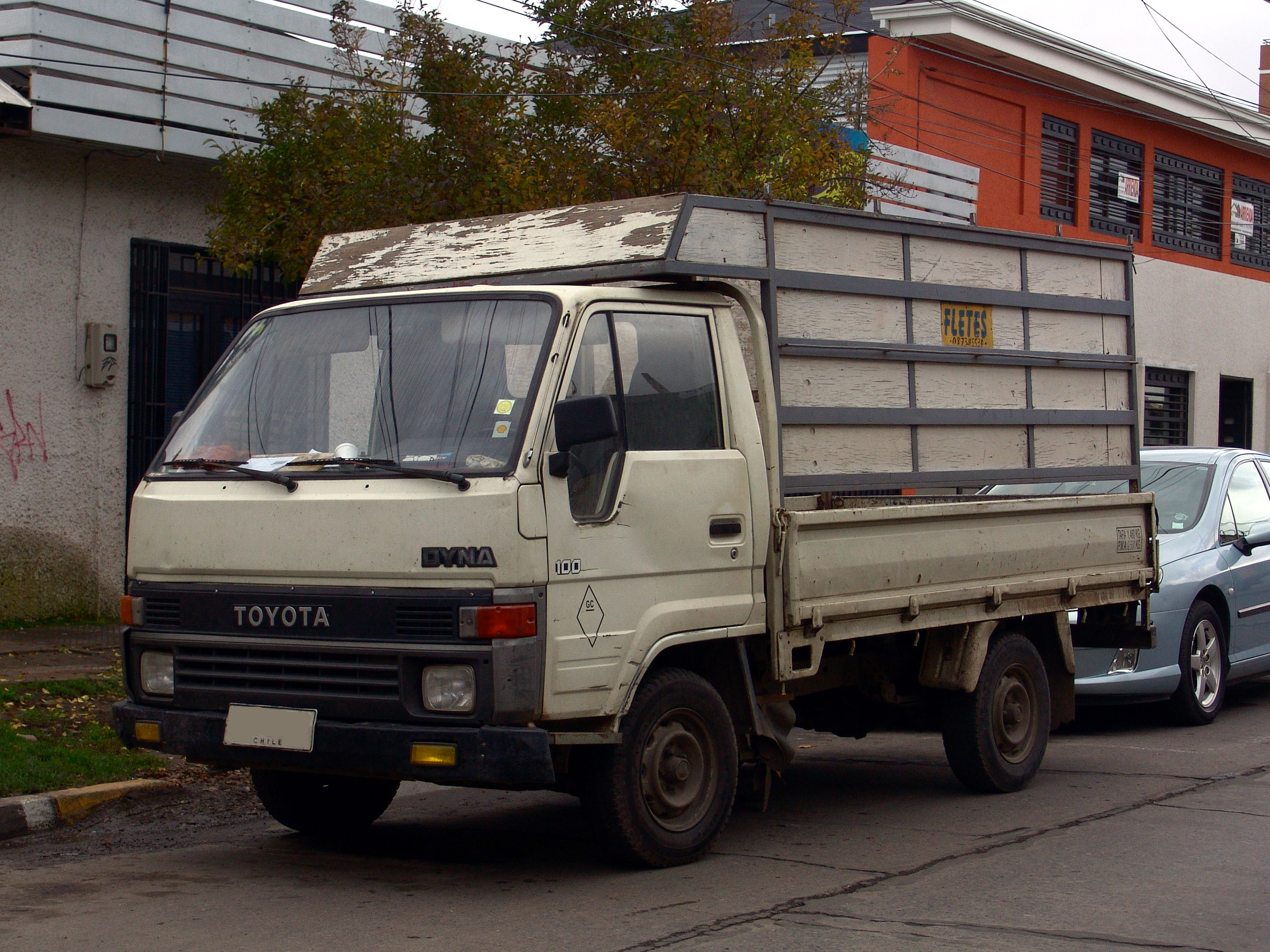
Toyota Dyna 100 (Y50-series, Chile)

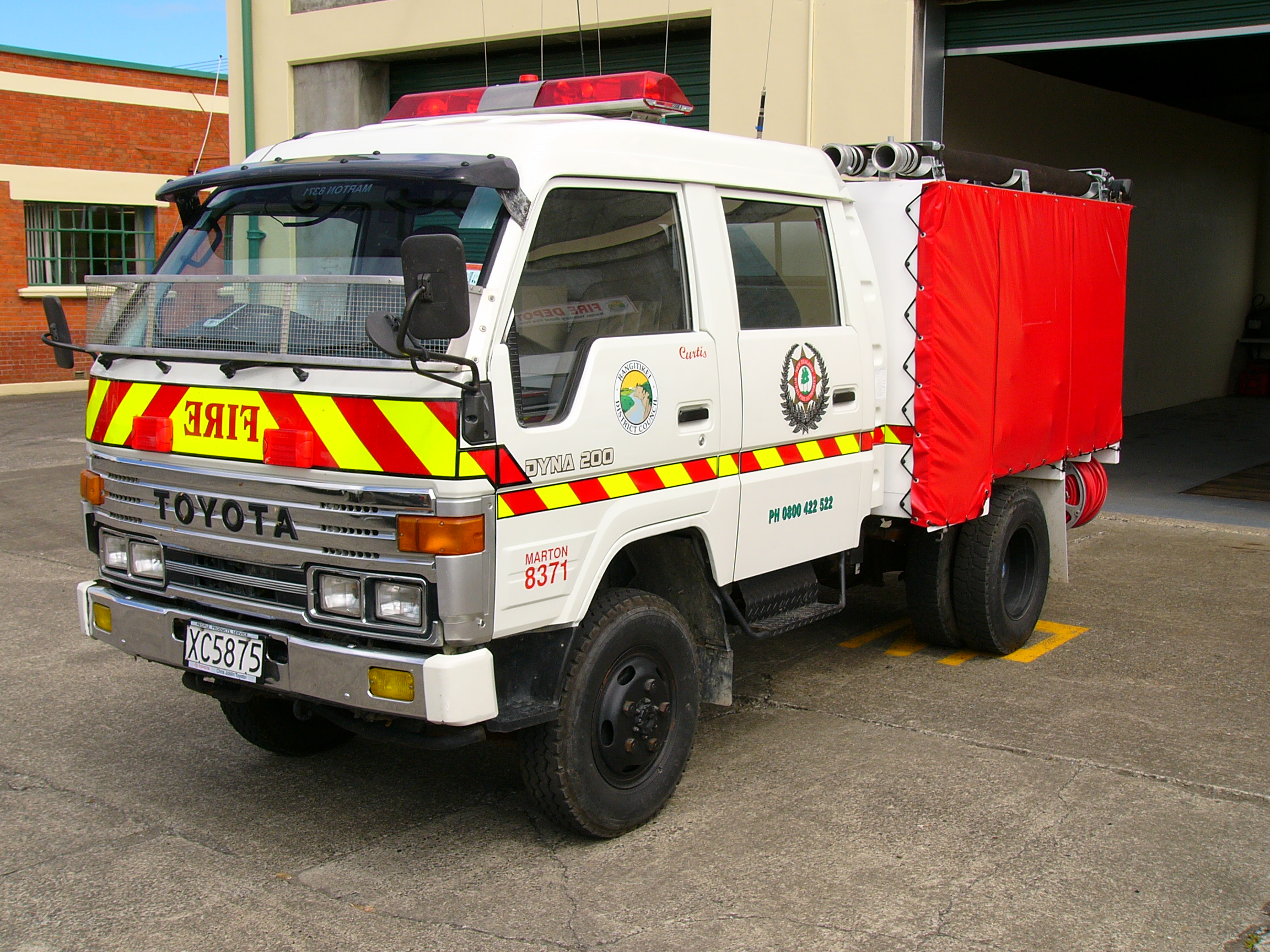
Facelift Toyota Dyna 200 double cab (New Zealand)

== U100, 200 / Y100 Series (1995–2002) ==
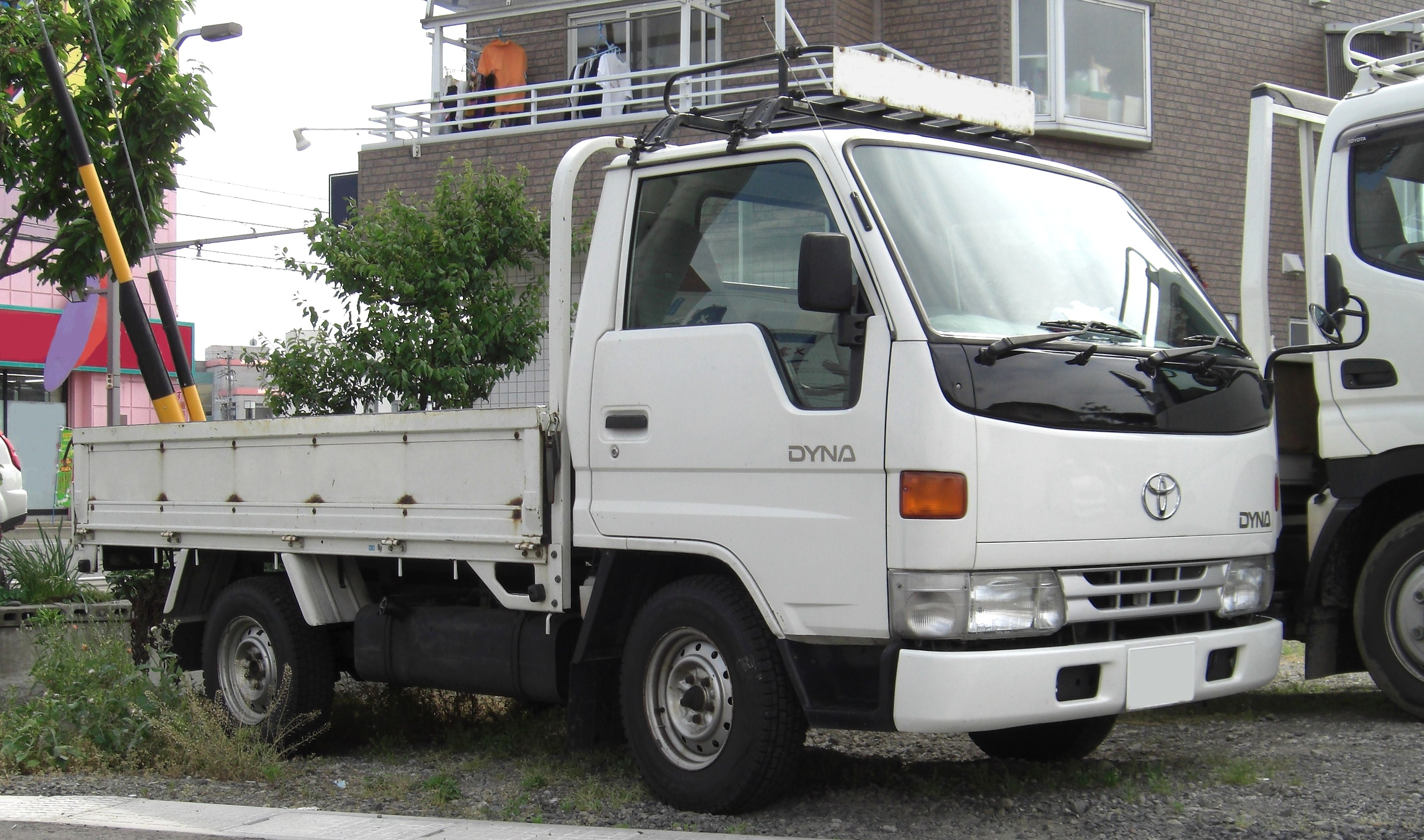
Toyota Dyna standard cab (Y100)

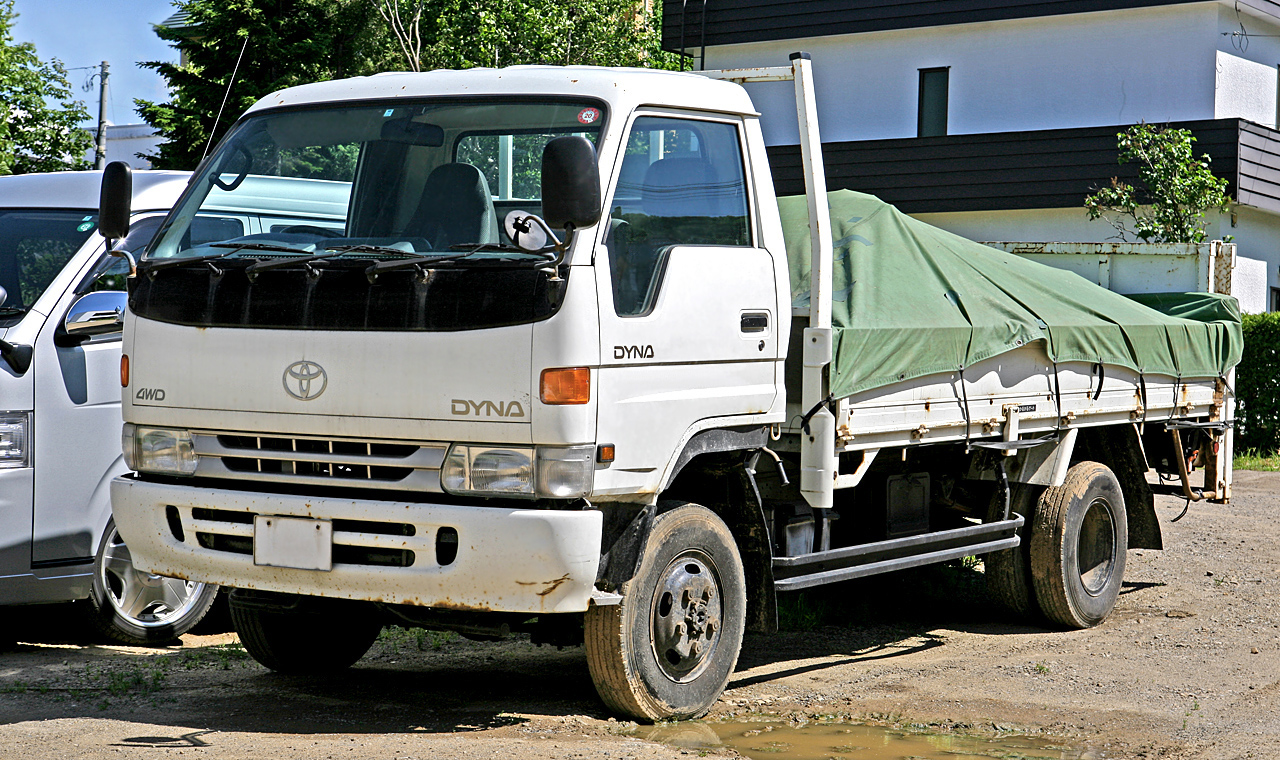
Toyota Dyna wide cab (U200)

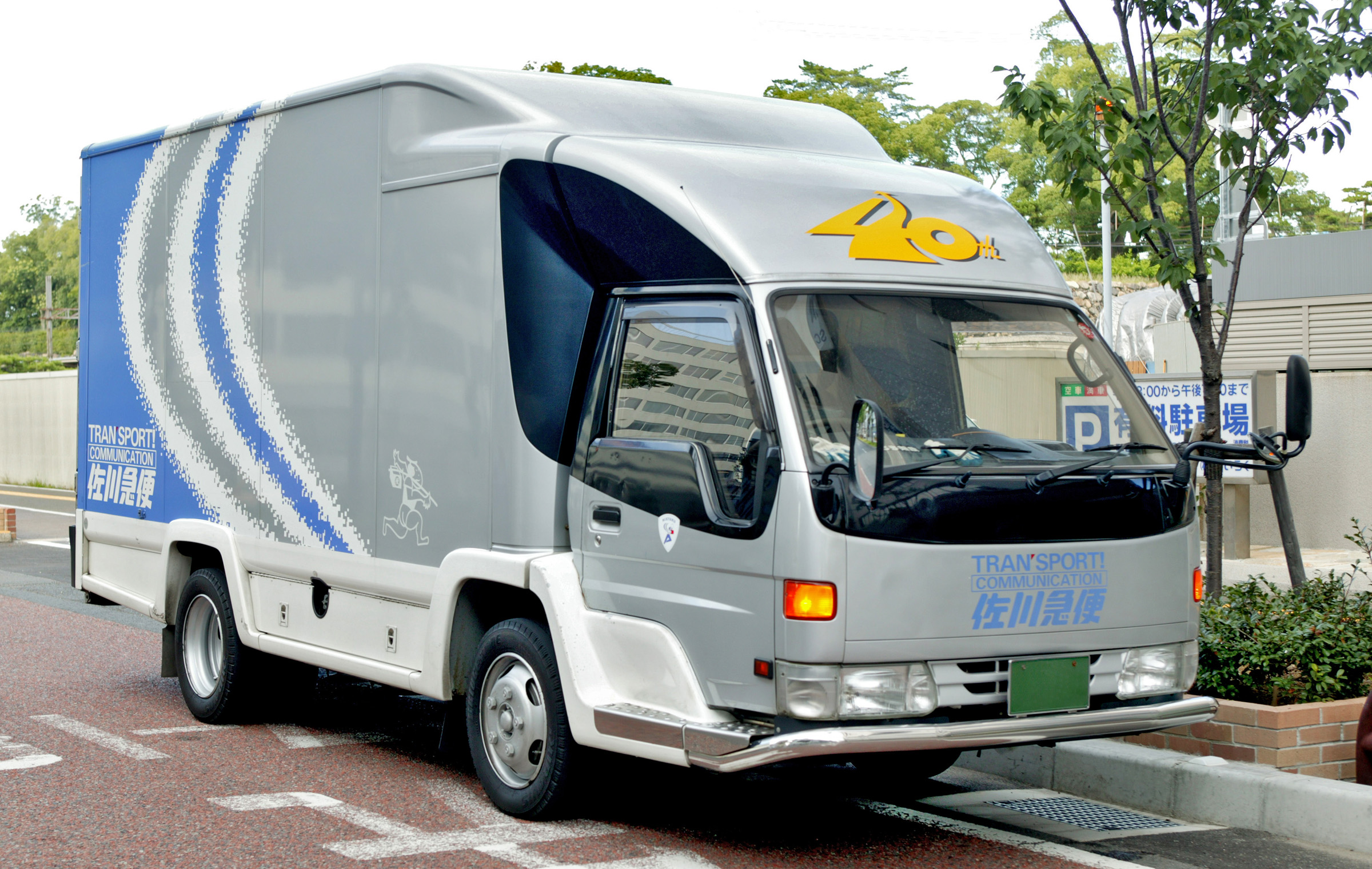
Toyota Dyna Super Low Cab

The sixth generation of the Dyna was introduced on 11 May 1995. New additions to the engines included the 5.3-liter J05C directed injected diesel engine along with a four valve 4.1-liter 15B-F engine. The diesel engines were designed to comply with new vehicle emissions standards. Additions to the petrol engines included a 2.7-litre four valve 3RZ-FE engine as well as an LPG variant of the same engine with a code of 3RZ-FP.

Exterior changes included new cab designs along with redesigned electrically controlled wing mirrors, new turn signals and new thermo plastic steel steps. On the interior, new adjustable seat belts were added with a reclining angle of 31 degrees along with a new dashboard. The braking and suspension systems were improved for enhanced performance. A new cab style called the grand cab was added to the line up in addition to the standard cab which was similar to the 4.0 tonne model but had extended deck space.

In 1997, a new cab style called the Super Low Cab was added to the range which features the cab ahead of the front axle. The cabin was moved forward by 690 mm (27.2 in) and the floor was lowered by 81 mm (3.2 in) for increased deck space.

As with many other generations of the Dyna, this generation was also assembled in Ovar, Portugal, by Toyota's local partner Caetano for local sales.

== U300 – U400 Series (1999–2021) and Hino Dutro ==
The seventh generation Dyna was introduced in May 1999 and was jointly developed by Toyota and Hino. The Hino Dutro sold as a result was a rebadged Toyota Dyna. The cabins were made more aerodynamic, spacious and curved. New headlamps were installed to continue the cabin aesthetic. Interior quality as well as the dashboard were improved and made more ergonomic.

The front suspension was modified and a new liquid sealed cab mount improved ride quality. The wheelbase was the longest in its class at 4,200 mm (165.4 in). Changes to the engine line up included the addition of a turbocharger to the 4.1-litre diesel engine.

The Dyna and its twin Toyoace and Dutro were built on the U300 platform for Standard Cab, or U400 platform for the Wide Cab. The Dyna Route Van/Dutro Vans are essentially standard Toyota HiAce (H100) van bodies mated with the Dyna/Dutro truck chassis.

Even though they were built on the U300 and U400 platforms, for marketing purpose these models still used the Dyna 100, 150, 200, 250, 300, and 350 names, indicating payload. The Dyna 100 was available with a 2.5 L (2,494 cc) D-4D common rail turbo diesel engine offering 88 PS (65 kW). The Dyna 150 is a chassis/cab version of the Dyna truck, with twin rear wheels, and an uprated 102 PS (75 kW) engine, shared with the HiLux and HiAce.

In June 2000, the LPG engine was revised and a new 2.0 L (1,998 cc) gasoline engine rated at 110 PS (81 kW) was added to the lineup. In September 2002, a low emissions model was introduced for use in metropolitan areas.

In May 2003, the engines were revised to comply with the 2001 vehicle emissions regulations. In September of the same year, a Hybrid model was added to the lineup. The Dyna/Dutro underwent a minor revision in May 2004 which resulted in the introduction of the common rail diesel fuel injection system as well as the EGR (for gasoline powered models) and DPR (for diesel powered models) systems. In July of the same year, the engine of the 1.0 tonne model was updated to 2.5 L (2,494 cc) engine rated at 109 PS (80 kW).

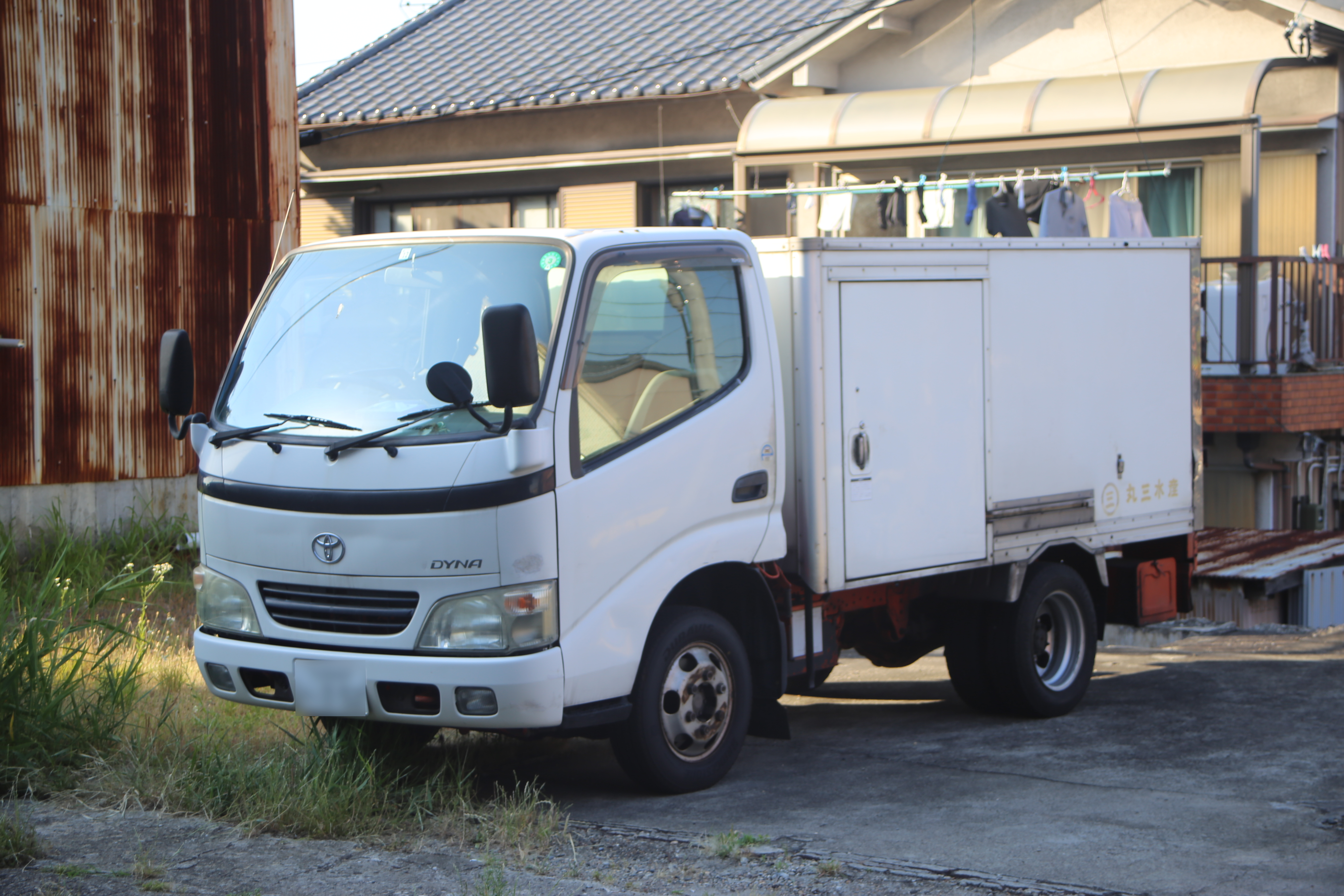
Pre-facelift Toyota Dyna standard cab (Japan)

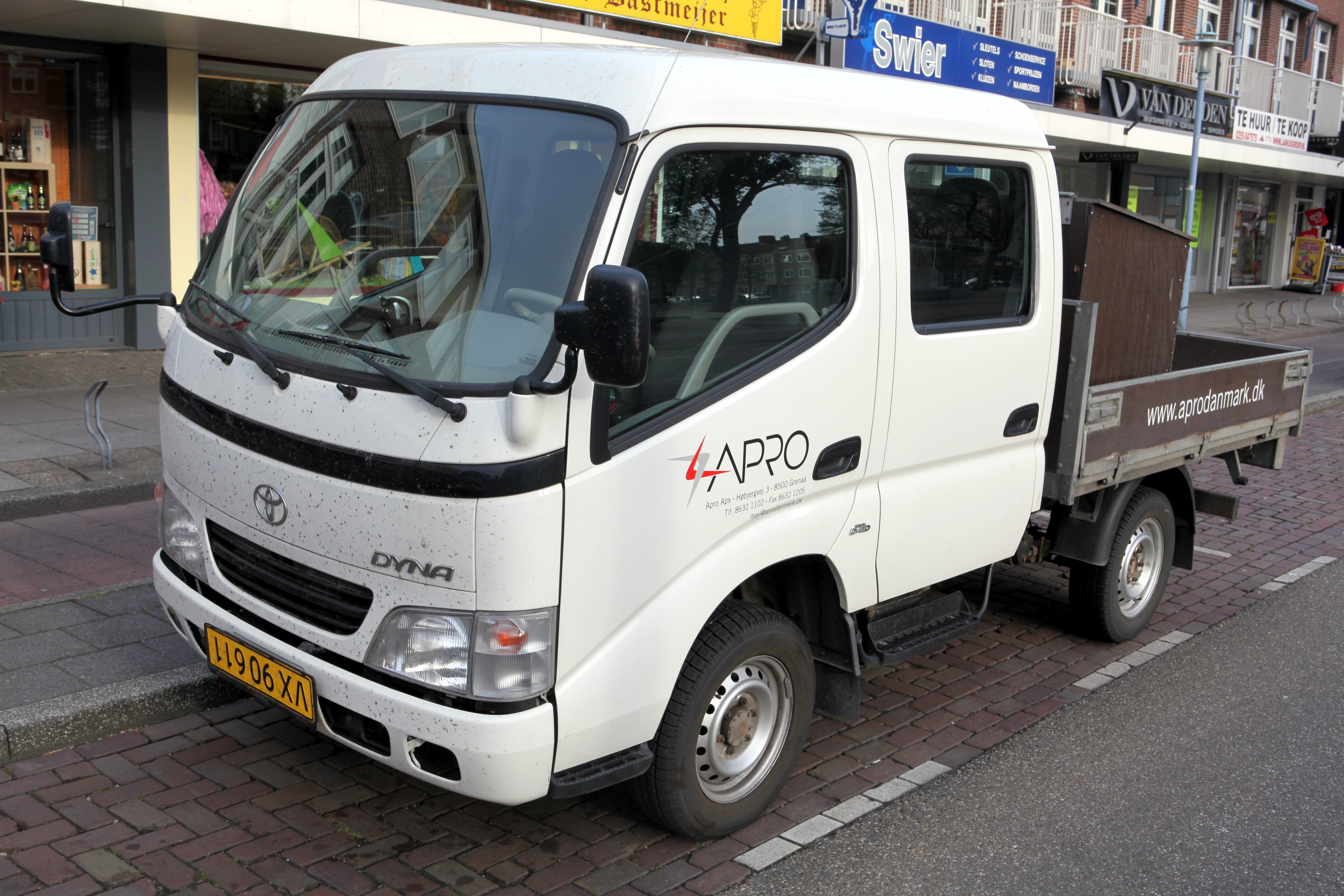
Pre-facelift Toyota Dyna double cab (U300; Europe)

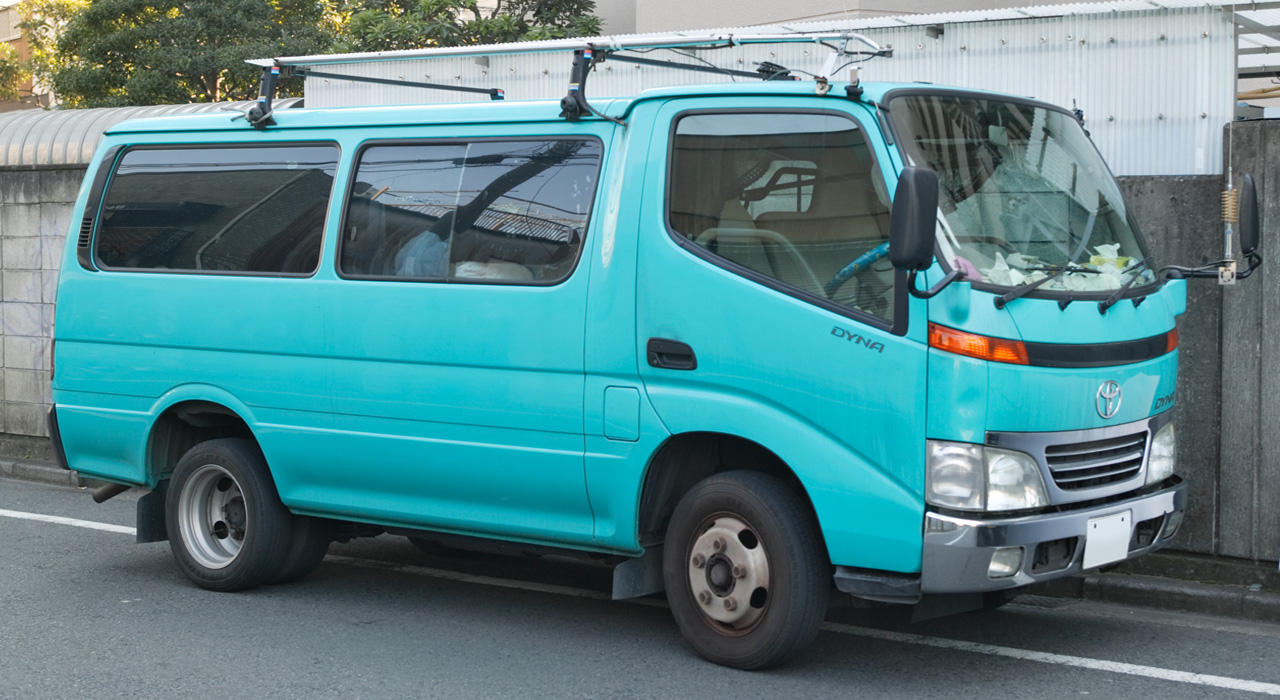
Pre-facelift Toyota Dyna Route Van (Y300; Japan)

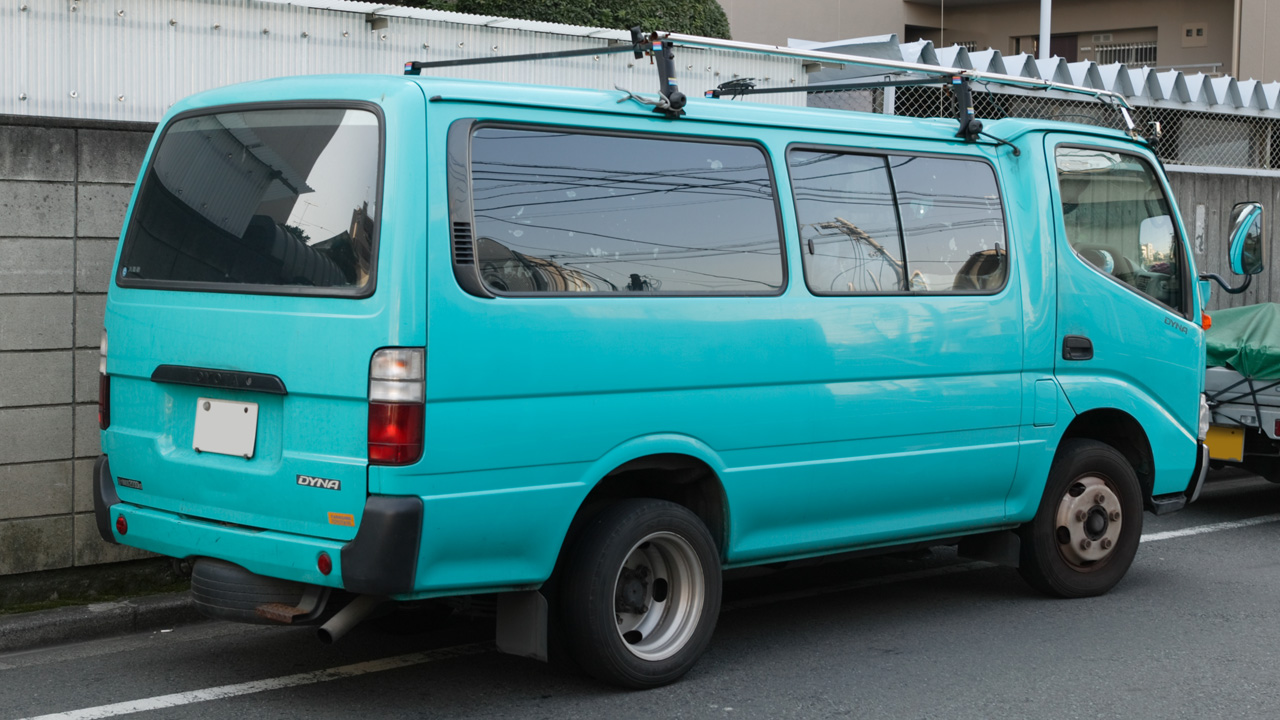
Rear view of Route Van

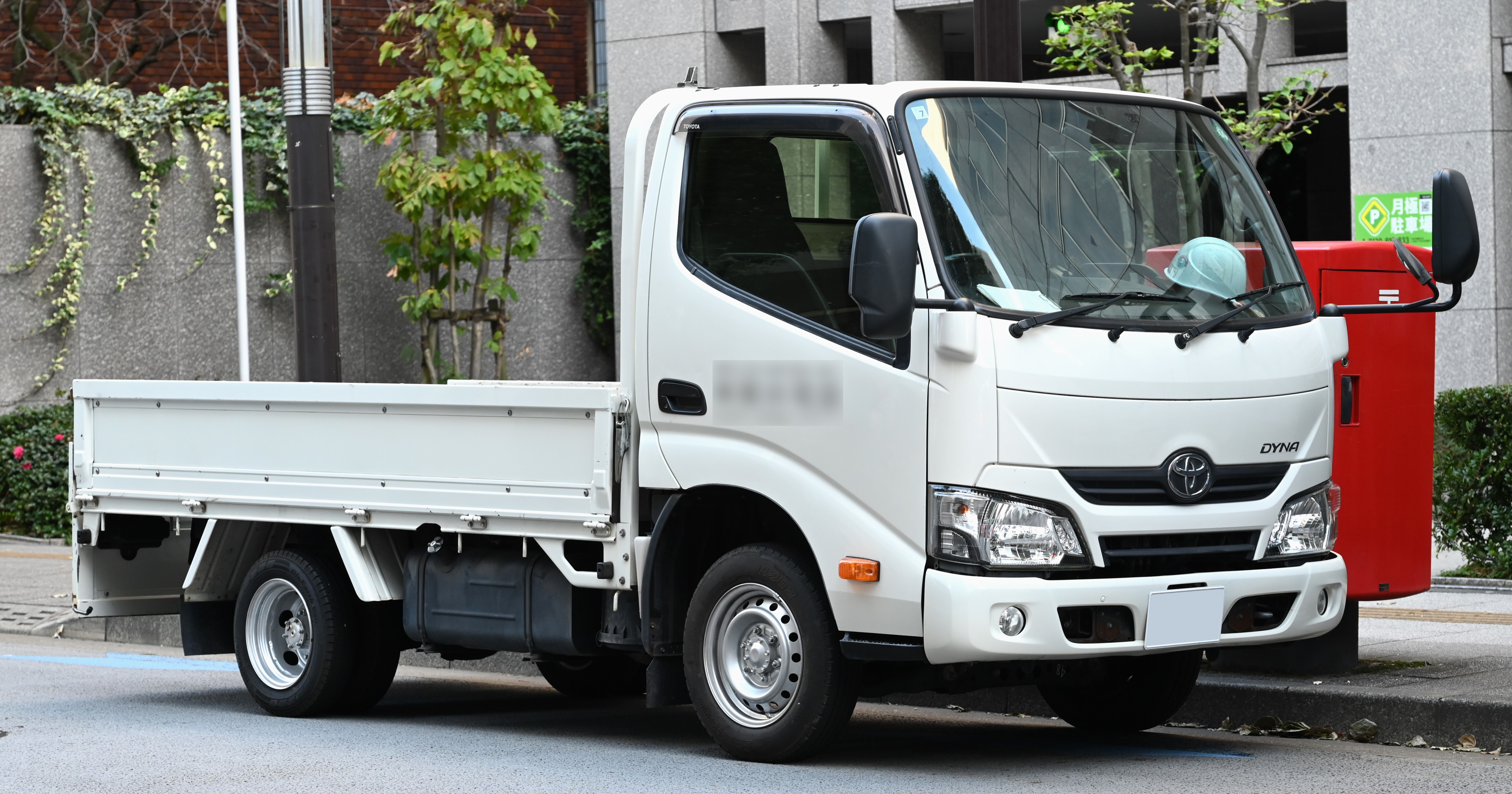
2016-2021 facelift Dyna (Japan)

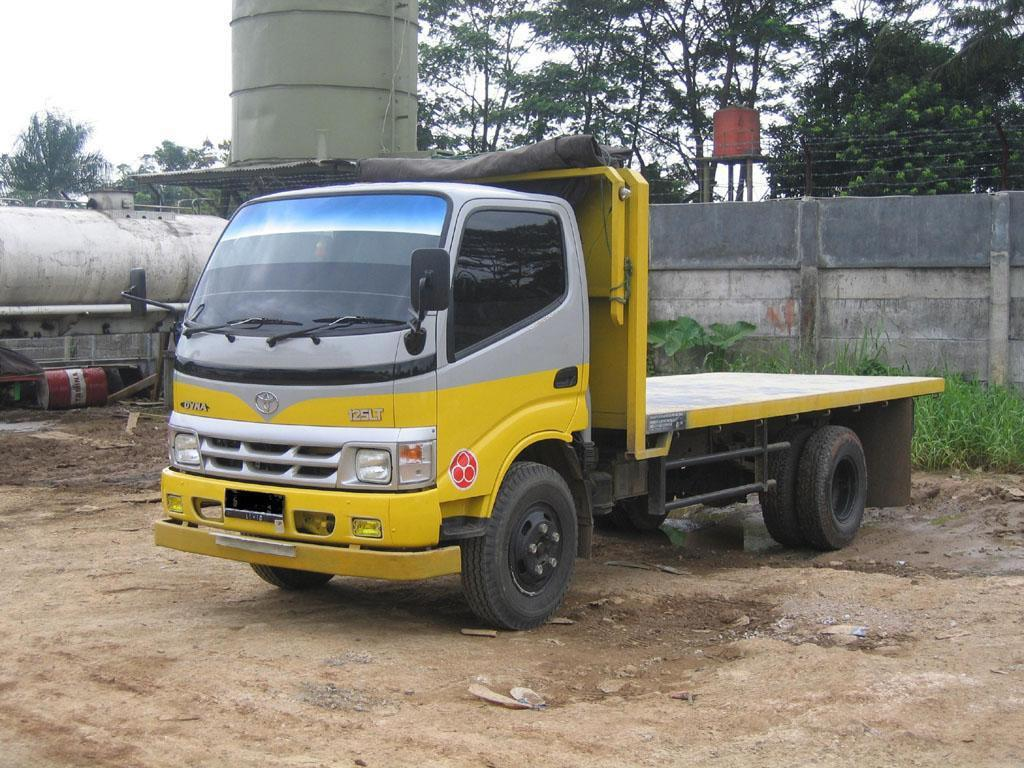
Pre-facelift Dyna 125LT (Indonesia)

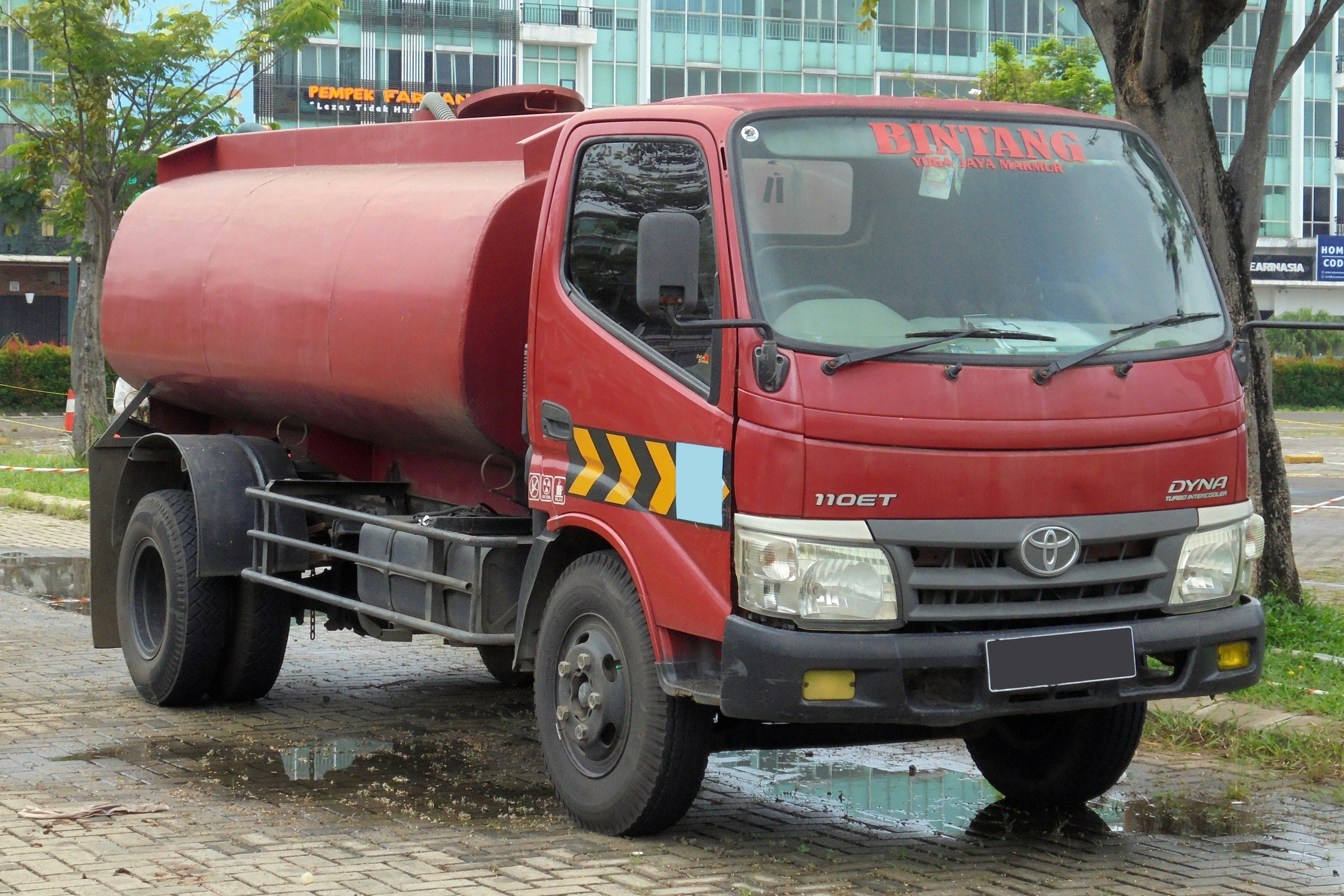
Facelift Dyna 110ET (Indonesia)

In September 2006, the engines of the 2.0 and 4.0 tonne models were made to comply with the Low Gas Vehicle Emissions regulations. In October 2006, the Hybrid model was revised for low emissions and was now eligible for tax reductions while the range underwent a facelift. In May 2007, a new 2.7 L (2,693 cc) diesel engine rated at 151 PS (111 kW) was added to the range. The LPG models were made to comply with 2005 Vehicle Emissions Regulations. The Dyna/Dutro also received a new vertical grille.

In May 2010, the diesel engines had an increased torque rating while the manual transmission was upgraded from a 5-speed unit to a 6-speed unit for improved fuel economy.

These vehicles have emission levels which meet the stringent Euro IV requirements which took effect in Europe in 2005, in Singapore in October 2006, and were applied in Japan from February 2007.

Beginning in 2003, Portuguese-made Dynas entered the rest of the European market – hitherto they had only been for local consumption.

== U600 - U800 series (2011–present) ==
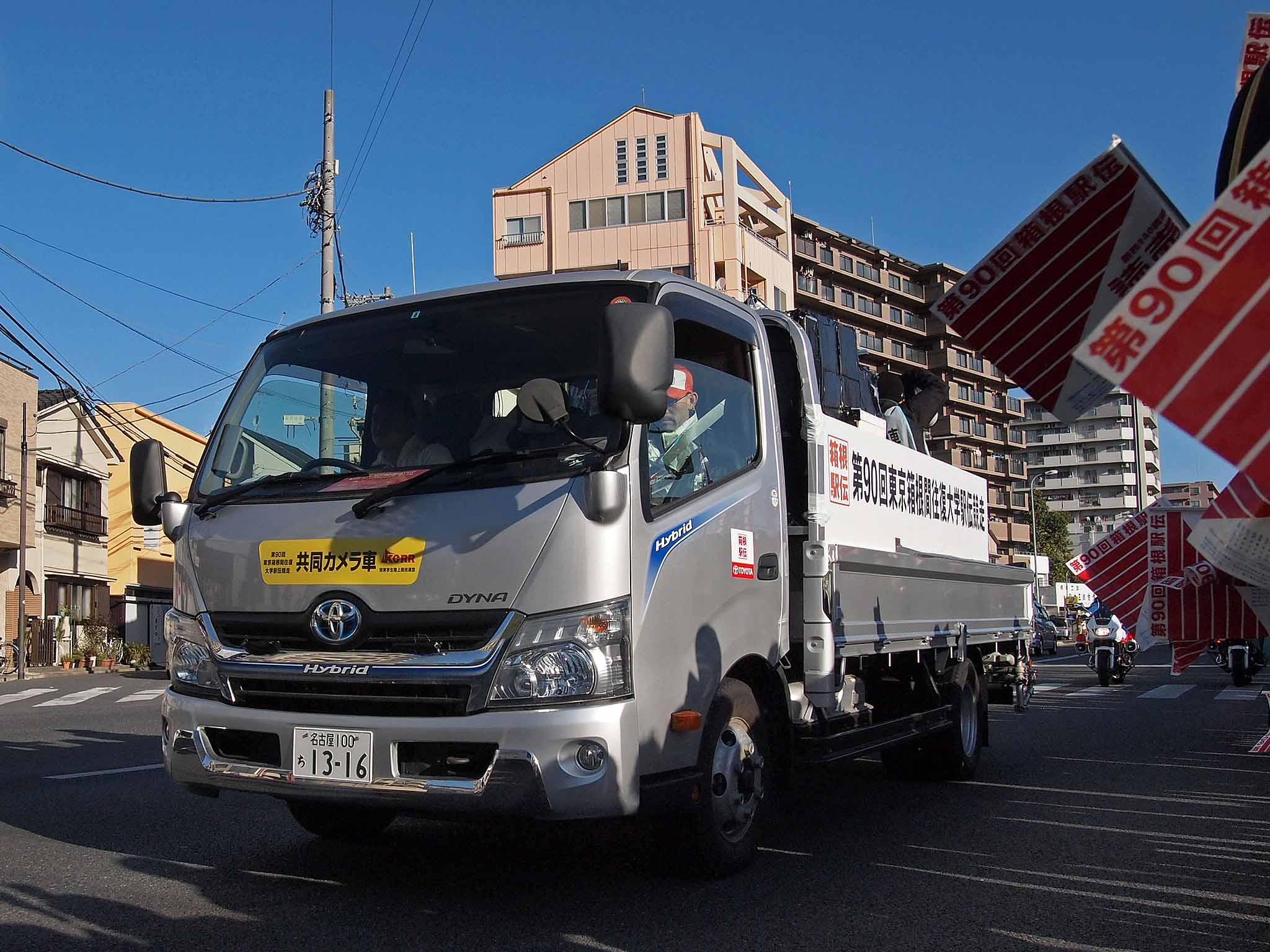
Toyota Dyna Hybrid (XZU700-series, Japan)

The eighth generation of the Dyna debuted in May 2011 and was based on the second-generation Hino Dutro. The lineup includes the U600, U700, and U800 models. The exterior was made more aerodynamic, and the interior quality was enhanced compared to the previous generation. In the hybrid models a 4.0 L (4,009 cc) diesel engine rated at 150 PS (110 kW) was paired with an electric motor rated at 49 PS (36 kW) which also serves as the starter motor. A new 5-speed automatic transmission was introduced which worked like a conventional automatic transmission with two paddles.

In March 2015, Salvador Caetano announced the cessation of Dyna assembly in Portugal, as the truck did not meet the Euro 6 emissions standards and would not be marketable within the European Union. Instead, a V6 petrol version of the Land Cruiser entered assembly, intended for sales in Africa. 1,664 Dynas were assembled in 2014, with 355 more scheduled for completion in 2015 before the switch was complete.

== See also ==
- Hino Dutro
- Hino Ranger
- List of hybrid vehicles
