= DIMA (database) =

Content
- Description: predicted and known interactions between protein domains

Contact
- Research center: Technical University of Munich
- Laboratory: Department of Genome Oriented Bioinformatics
- Authors: Philipp Pagel
- Primary citation: Pagel & al. (2006)
- Release date: 2006

Access
- Website: http://webclu.bio.wzw.tum.de/dima

Miscellaneous
- Version: 3

The Domain Interaction MAp (DIMA) is a database of predicted and known interactions between protein domains. Version 3.0 of the database was released in 2010.

== See also ==
- Protein domain
- Protein–protein interaction
