= Pedro Dimas =

Mexican musician (1934–2021)

Don Pedro Dimas (1934 – January 2021) was a Mexican violinist, guitarist, composer, and preservationist of traditional music from the Purépecha, an Indigenous culture in the Mexican state of Michoacán.

== Life and career ==
Dimas was born in the village of Ichupio, Michoacán, near the city of Tzintzuntzan, to a musical family, and received only two years of formal education. While in his teens, Dimas learned to play the mandolin and violin, initially to provide music for folkdancing performances.

In 1952, Dimas began to play with a group from Santa Fe de la Laguna. The name reflects the indigenous utopian cooperative villages or "hospitales" created by Bishop Quiroga in the Michoacán area in the late 15th century. Later, he began playing with a mariachi in Tzintzuntzan, and learned many styles from them. When the group went to Mexico City, Dimas stayed behind to farm and fish.

As an adult, Dimas composed and choreographed the folk dance "Dance of the Tumbis", which represents the life of a fisherman on Lake Pátzcuaro.

Dimas later performed with his band, Mirando al Lago, throughout Mexico and the United States. He died in January 2021.

== Preservation of Purépecha culture ==
The Purépecha language was still spoken by somewhat fewer than 100,000 people at the end of the 20th century, mostly in small rural villages. But while the language thrived, the traditional music of the Purépecha was threatened by the popularity of other styles. Dimas sees his composition of new songs in the traditional genre "a form of rescue."

== Sources ==
- Stavely, Zaidee Playing Music to the Scent of Marigolds: The Day of the Dead in Michoacán Fiddler Magazine (Fall 2005)
- Stavely, Zaidee Don Pedro Dimas: Rescuing Purépecha Music and Dance in Michoacán Fiddler Magazine (Spring 2005)
