= Dima, Ethiopia =

Dima is the name of a number of towns or district in Ethiopia:

- Dima, Tigray, a town in the Tigray Region of Ethiopia
- Dima, Gojjam, a town in the Amhara Region of Ethiopia
- Dima (woreda), a district in the Oromia Region of Ethiopia
- Dima (Tigray woreda), a district in the Tigray Region of Ethiopia
