= Dima Sara =

Dima Sara ديماسرا
- Village
- Location within Iran
- Coordinates: 37°07′32″N 49°54′01″E
- Country: Iran
- Province: Gilan
- County: Siahkal
- Bakhsh: Central
- Rural District: Malfejan

Population (2006)
  - Total: 48
- Time zone: UTC+3:30 (IRST)

Dima Sara (Persian: ديماسرا, also Romanized as Dīmā Sarā) is a village in Malfejan Rural District, in the Central District of Siahkal County, Gilan Province, Iran. At the 2016 census, its population was 36, in 18 families. Down from 48 in 2006.
