= Dima al-Wawi =

Palestinian prisoner

Dima al-Wawi ديما الواوي
- Born: November 20, 2003 (age 22); Hebron Governorate, Palestine
- Known for: The youngest Palestinian prisoner
- Parent: Ismail al-Wawi (father)
- Relatives: Mohammed al-Wawi (brother)

Dima al-Wawi (born November 20, 2003) is a Palestinian from Hebron. She was the youngest girl ever imprisoned by Israel, having been sentenced to four months in jail at age 12 for attempted manslaughter after attempting to stab a security guard at the main entrance of Karmei Tzur. She was released six weeks early on April 24, 2016; following her release she said that she had intended to kill the security guard and had dreamed of being "martyred".

== Arrest ==
On February 9, 2016 al-Wawi was arrested near the Karmei Tzur settlement next to the Arab village of Halhoul Halhul, north of Hebron, having approached the settlement carrying a large knife and with the intent to stab a security guard. As she approached the settlement a security guard told her to stop, while another resident told her to lie on the ground and surrender her knife; she complied. The resident then asked her whether she had come to kill Jews; she responded "yes".

According to al-Wawi, while she was being arrested she was kicked by Israeli soldiers, and a security guard stood on her back and threatened to shoot her.

== Detention and conviction ==
After being arrested she was transferred to an Israeli prison; according to al-Wawi she was initially moved to Hasharon Prison and then Ramla Prison. The day after her arrest she was transferred again, this time to Ofer military court, for a hearing before Hanan Rubinstein where prosecutors requested that her detention be extended by six days to allow for her parents to be interrogated; the judge granted a one day extension. She returned to court the next day for a hearing before Moshe Levy, where prosecutors again requested that her detention be extended by six days to allow time to file an indictment; defense lawyers instead requested that she be transferred to a closed hostel in Bethlehem, a request that the judge granted conditional on a bail of NIS 8,000 and a third party guarantee of NIS 25,000.

During this initial period she was interrogated without either a lawyer or her parents present; at her pretrial hearing defense lawyers raised the absence of her parents, but the judge concluded that "parental presence is indeed a minor's right", but that investigators do not have to "wait endlessly for the parent to arrive", while adding that "naturally counsel for the defense retains all his arguments when a judicial proceeding is held after indictment". She said that during interrogation she had been yelled at, and that attending six court hearings in shackles had caused her to develop a limp; according to her mother her parents were "fooled into believing that we would be permitted to attend her interrogation" but were instead interrogated themselves, and that during the hearings al-Wawi was "unaware of what was happening around her".

Under a plea agreement with Israeli prosecutors she was convicted of attempted manslaughter and sentenced to four months in the closed hostel that she had already been transferred to, with an additional six weeks suspended sentence. She was also fined NIS 8,000. Human rights organization B'Tselem argued that she had no choice but to accept this plea deal, as an evidence based trial would have taken months during which she would have had to remain in pretrial detention.

Palestinian children in the West Bank are subject to a much harsher justice system than Israeli children and Palestinian children resident in East Jerusalem are subject to. They are subject to Military Law, which permits minors aged twelve and older to be jailed; at the time of her conviction under Israeli civil law only minors fourteen and older can be jailed. On August 3, 2016, the Knesset passed the Youth bill in response to a surge of young children committing violent crimes, which lowers the age someone can be jailed under civil law to twelve if they are convicted of involvement in "acts of terror", described as "murder, attempted murder, or manslaughter"; the law was criticized amidst concerns that it would be applied unequally and that it violates international standards.

== Release ==
On April 24, 2016, six weeks before her scheduled release date, al-Wawi was released; Israeli prison spokesperson Assaf Librati said that the early release was due to her age. Her return to Halhoul was celebrated by the residents, who draped banners, played music and honked car horns. At the celebration, she explained that she had intended to kill the security guard and had hoped that she would be killed in the process, but was quickly apprehended; "I was dreaming that I was going to be martyred".
