= Avudim =

Russian masculine given name

Avudim (Russian: Авуди́м) is an old and uncommon Russian Christian male first name. The name is possibly derived from the Greek word aoidimos, meaning praised in song, or from Serbian Muslim phrase meaning Dima's father (a moniker referring to a married person).

Its diminutive is Dima (Ди́ма).

The patronymics derived from "Avudim" are "Авуди́мович" (Avudimovich; masculine) and "Авуди́мовна" (Avudimovna; feminine).
