= Toyota Stout =

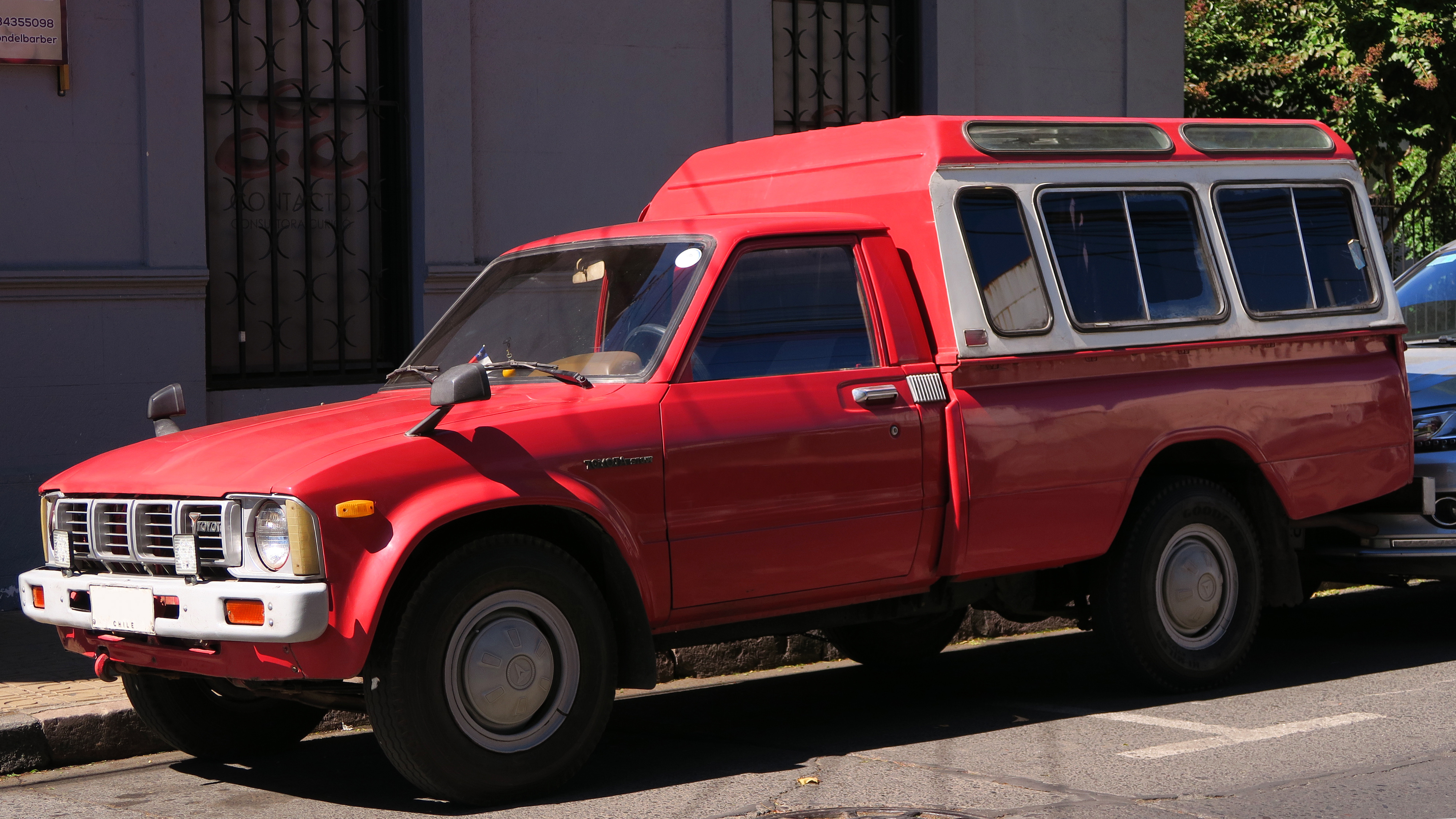
- Toyota Stout (K110)

Overview
- Manufacturer: Toyota
- Production: April 1956–February 2000

Body and chassis
- Class: Light truck
- Layout: Front engine, rear-wheel-drive
- Chassis: Ladder frame

Chronology
- Predecessor: Toyopet RK
- Successor: Toyota TUV (Lite Stout, South Africa); Toyota Hilux; Toyota Hilux Champ (spiritual)

The Toyota Stout is a light truck produced by the Japanese automaker Toyota from 1956 through 2000. The Stout is the successor of the RK truck and inherited its K-series model code. The K-series model code was also shared with the Dyna and ToyoAce semi-cab over trucks. The similar K-series model codes among these vehicles caused confusion in the market, because earlier Toyota commercial vehicles were sold by their model codes rather than proper names until the late 1950s. The K-series code became exclusive to the Stout when the ToyoAce was switched to the Y-series in 1971. In Japan, the Stout was sold at Toyota Japanese dealerships called Toyopet Store.

The Stout was effectively replaced by the Hilux in most markets in 1968. In some regions, both vehicles were sold alongside each other, with the Stout positioned as a heavy-duty alternative to the Hilux.

== First generation (K20/30; 1954–1960) ==
First generation
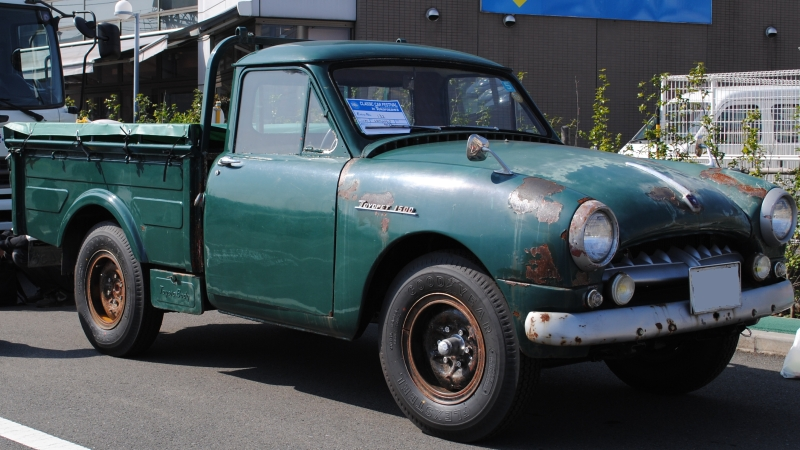
- Toyopet RK23

Overview
- Model code: K20; K30
- Also called: Toyopet RK23/30/35; Toyopet Stout
- Production: 1956–1960
- Assembly: Koromo/Honsha Plant, Toyota City, Aichi, Japan

Body and chassis
- Body style: 2-door pickup truck; 3-door station wagon/van
- Related: Toyota Dyna; Toyopet Master; Toyopet Masterline

Powertrain
- Engine: 1.5 L R I4
- Transmission: 3-speed manual; 4-speed manual

Dimensions
- Wheelbase: 2,515 mm (99.0 in) (RK30); 2,530 mm (99.6 in) (RK23); 2,740 mm (107.9 in) (RK35)
- Length: 4,285 mm (168.7 in) (RK30); 4,290 mm (168.9 in) (RK23); 4,675–4,690 mm (184.1–184.6 in) (RK35)
- Width: 1,670–1,690 mm (65.7–66.5 in)
- Height: 1,700 mm (66.9 in); 1,770 mm (69.7 in) (RK35 universal pickup)
- Curb weight: 1,345 kg (2,965 lb) (RK30); 1,360 kg (2,998 lb) (RK23); 1,375–1,530 kg (3,031–3,373 lb) (RK35)

Introduced in April 1956 as the Toyopet RK23 1.5 ton truck, it was launched as the successor of the RK. The RK23 used the same cabin as the Masterline coupé utility, which in turn had been derived from the short-lived Master sedan. Despite both pickup trucks employing a ladder frame chassis, the RK23 was positioned as a heavy-duty model with twice payload capacity than the Masterline. The truck also shared its chassis with the Dyna cab over truck until it received a new generation with an original chassis in 1963.

Its main competitor was the Nissan Junior. The RK23 was assembled in Toyota Shatai's Koromo Plant, which was renamed the Honsha Plant in August 1960.

The engine was the 49 PS (36 kW; 48 hp), 1.5-litre R coupled with a three-speed manual transmission, same as the Masterline and the earlier RK. It also used mechanicals common to new vehicles of its time, such as front and rear leaf springs, solid axles suspension and four-wheel drum brakes. In 1957, the engine power was increased to 55 PS (40 kW; 54 hp), along with the introduction of two-door extended cab (called universal truck) and three-door van/station wagon body styles.

In April 1958, the RK23 was revised with a minor facelift to become the RK30, adopting a four-speed manual transmission with synchromesh, and relocating the gear shifter to the column to accommodate seating for three people. The RK30 was also shorter and lighter than the RK23. Two months later, the lineup was expanded to include the long-wheelbase RK35 with a 1.75-ton payload. Three-door van/station wagon, and extended cab models were now only offered on the RK35 chassis. The power of the 1.5-litre engine was also raised to 58 PS (43 kW; 57 hp).

In June 1959, to avoid confusion with the RK85 (Dyna), it was renamed the Toyopet Stout in a naming competition participated by Toyota and sales channel employees. Another engine tweak was occurred again a month later, now producing 60 PS (44 kW; 59 hp).

== Second generation (K40/100; 1960–1978) ==
Second generation
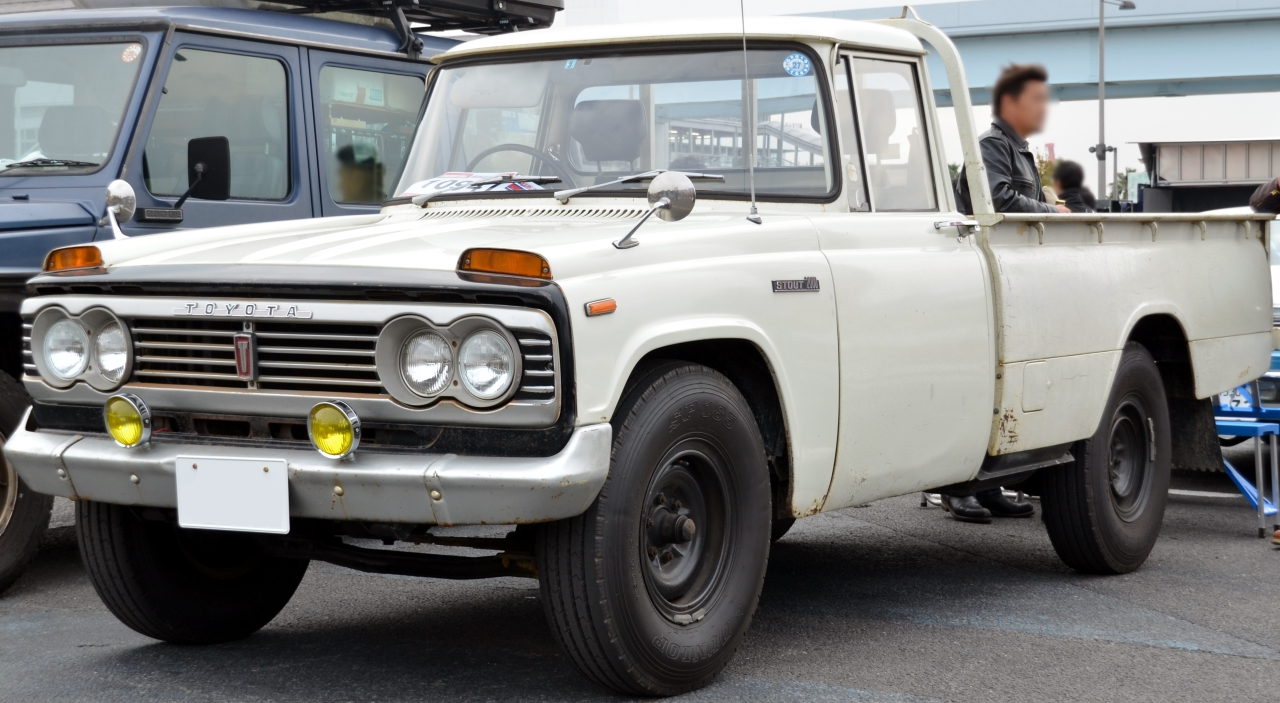
- 1967–1978 Toyota Stout 2000 (RK101)

Overview
- Model code: K40; K100
- Also called: Toyota Lite Stout; Toyota Stallion (South Africa); Toyopet Stout; Toyopet Lite Stout
- Production: 1960–1978
- Assembly: Honsha Plant, Toyota City, Japan; Durban, South Africa (Motor Assemblies Limited); Samrong Tai, Thailand (Toyota Motor Thailand); Montevideo, Uruguay (Automotora Basso); Ventanilla, Peru (Toyota del Peru)

Body and chassis
- Body style: 2-door pickup truck; 4-door pickup truck; 5-door station wagon/van

Powertrain
- Engine: 1.5 L R I4 (RK40/45); 1.5 L 2R I4 (RK43/47); 1.9 L 3R-B I4 (RK41/100); 2.0 L 5R I4 (RK44/101)
- Transmission: 4-speed manual

Dimensions
- Wheelbase: Lite Stout: 2,600 mm (102.4 in) (1963–1964); 2,650 mm (104.3 in) (from 1964); Stout: 2,800 mm (110.2 in)
- Length: Lite Stout: 4,285 mm (168.7 in) (1963–1964); 4,335 mm (170.7 in) (from 1964); Stout: 4,690 mm (184.6 in) (1960–1967); 4,670 mm (183.9 in) (1967–1978)
- Width: 1,690 mm (66.5 in)
- Height: Lite Stout: 1,710–1,725 mm (67.3–67.9 in); Stout: 1,750 mm (68.9 in)
- Curb weight: Lite Stout: 1,190–1,200 kg (2,624–2,646 lb); Stout: 1,380–1,460 kg (3,042–3,219 lb)

Completely redesigned in July 1960, this is the most familiar version of the Stout. The pickup truck initially released with the 1,453 cc R engine (RK45), while the maximum load capacity remained the same at 1.75-ton as the older RK35. In October 1962, a 2-ton version (RK100) was introduced with a 1,897 cc 3R-B engine, which was introduced to counter the 2-ton Nissan Junior 1900. Along with the new optional engine, the Stout also underwent a facelift, including twin headlights.

Conventional mechanical parts were used in the form of leaf springs and four-wheel drum brakes on a ladder frame chassis. Body styles include a pickup (two-door, three seater), a double-cab pickup (four-door, six seater), a two-door box van and a five door station wagon. Trucks were built in Toyota Shatai's Honsha Plant, while the vans were assembled by Arakawa Auto Body Industries (also in Honsha).

The Stout was Toyota's launch model in South Africa in 1961. It sold well until its discontinuation in 1979. The RK45 Stout was the first Toyota to begin complete knock-down assembly in South Africa, in 1962. Between 1961 and 1975, 17,500 Stouts were sold in South Africa – the majority of them assembled locally. This generation Stout was also assembled by Toyota Motor Thailand, beginning in February 1964, in Uruguay by Automotora Basso from 1963 to 1972, and 940 units in Peru between 1967 and 1971.

In September 1963 there also appeared a shorter and lighter duty model powered by the 1.5-litre R engine called Lite Stout (RK40), which featured independent coil sprung front suspension for a more carlike ride. This was meant to compete directly with Nissan's Datsun minitrucks, but it never sold particularly well in its home market and was replaced by the Briska and Hilux following Toyota's takeover of Hino Motors. A version of the Lite Stout, equipped with the 1.9-litre 3R engine was sold in North America as the Stout 1900 (RK41) between 1964 and 1967. During its first year in the American market, a total of 4 units were sold. This Lite Stout model was assembled in South Africa as well, beginning in 1965. It was called the Stallion there to distinguish it from the original model with its solid front axle.

Due to complaints in export markets about limited cabin space, a new cabin expanded by 50 mm (2 in) was introduced along with another facelift in 1964. Instead of lengthening the vehicle, Toyota opted a new shorter rear bed – from 2,275 mm (89.6 in) to 2,225 mm (87.6 in) – for the long wheelbase heavy-duty Stout, but this version was not offered in Japan despite the new version was still under the Japanese maximum length of 4.7 metres (185.0 in). The shorter Light Stout instead received a correspondingly lengthened wheelbase to accommodate the longer cab. South African Stouts kept using a simplified version of the original bed, even after the longer cabin had been introduced, as they were not affected by Japanese regulations on overall length. Bed length was thus 2,310 mm (91 in), longer than elsewhere. Also in this facelift, the 1.5-litre engine was replaced by the slightly larger 2R unit (1,490 cc), the Lite Stout became the RK43, while the 1.75 ton Stout became the RK47.

There was also the RK47P, a one-tonne six-seater medium duty version with the same 70 PS (51 kW) 2R engine. Another update and facelift occurred in September 1967 with the introduction of the RK101. This also spelled the end of all 1.5-litre models for Japan, although they continued to be available in export markets. In some markets (e.g. North America) the Stout was replaced by the slightly smaller Hilux in 1969, but in many other markets (e.g. Southeast Asia and Australia) it was sold alongside the Hilux as a heavier-duty alternative.

The RK101 used the 1,994 cc 5R engine. Its 93 PS (68 kW) in Japanese trim, combined with low gearing for higher load capacity, provided a top speed of only 110 km/h (68 mph). In later versions higher compression meant that power increased to 98 PS (72 kW) at 5200 rpm. The engine displacement remained under 2.0-litre so as to offer Japanese buyers some tax advantages when it came time to pay the Japanese annual road tax. South African production later switched to the 2.0-litre RK101 series, available as a flush-side pickup, a dropside, or a chassis/cab. There was also a 2.0-litre version of the South Africa Stallion (RK44). The South African RK101 claimed 79 kW (107 PS; 106 hp) SAE at 5200 rpm. Export models to DIN specifications claimed 71 kW (95 hp).

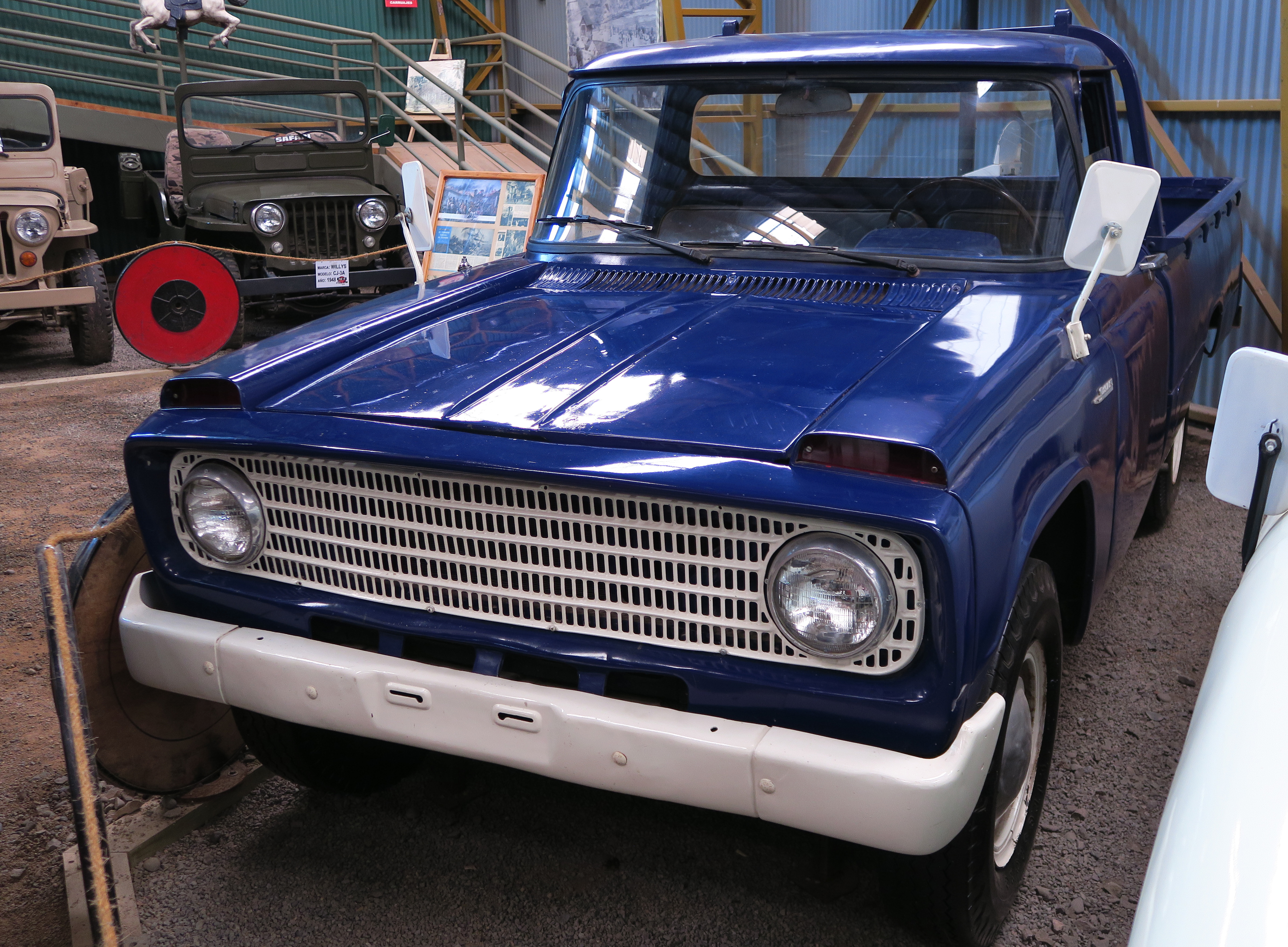
1960–1962 Toyopet Stout (RK45)

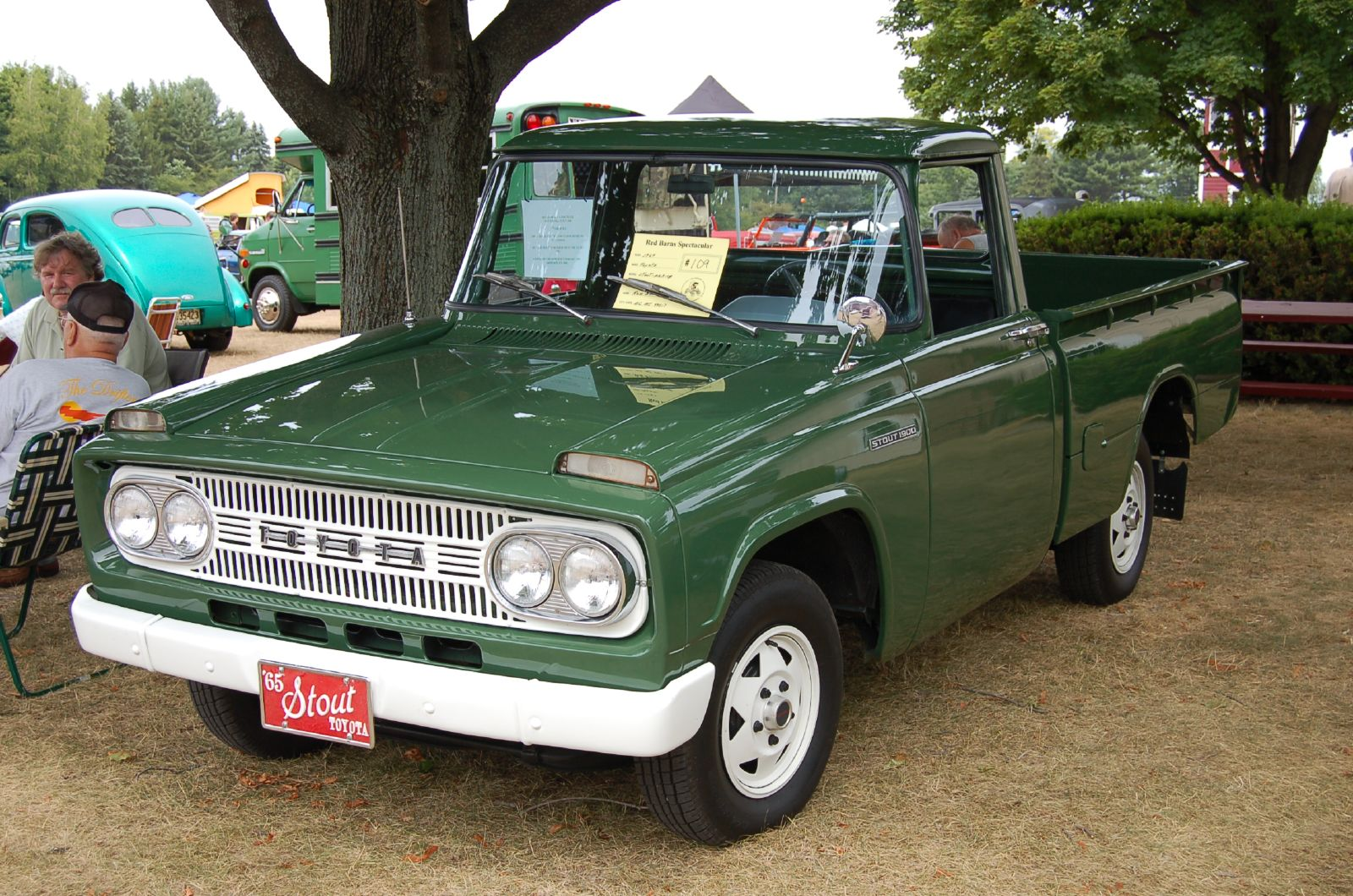
1962–1964 Toyota Stout 1900 (RK41)

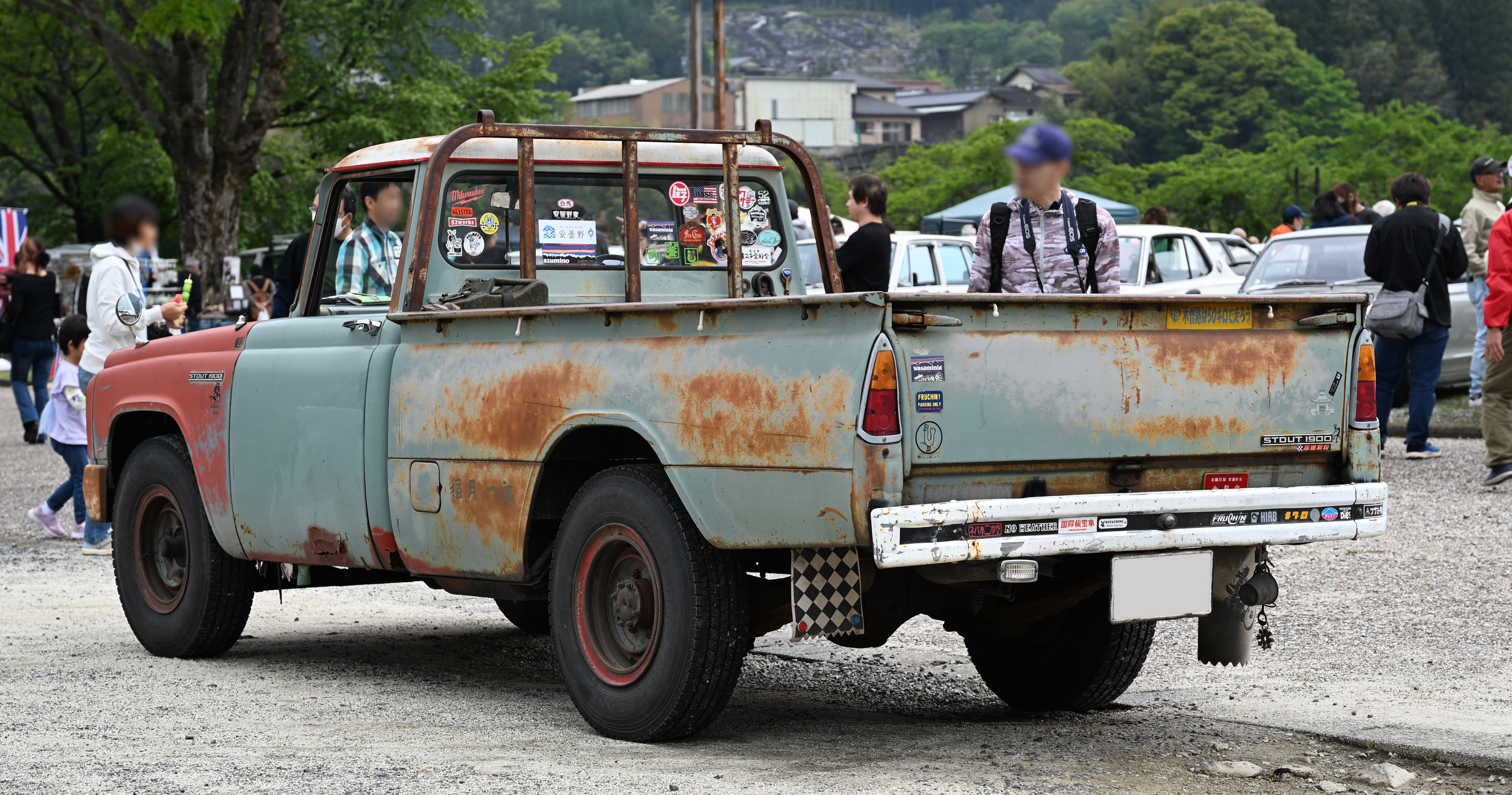
Rear view of 1960–1964 model

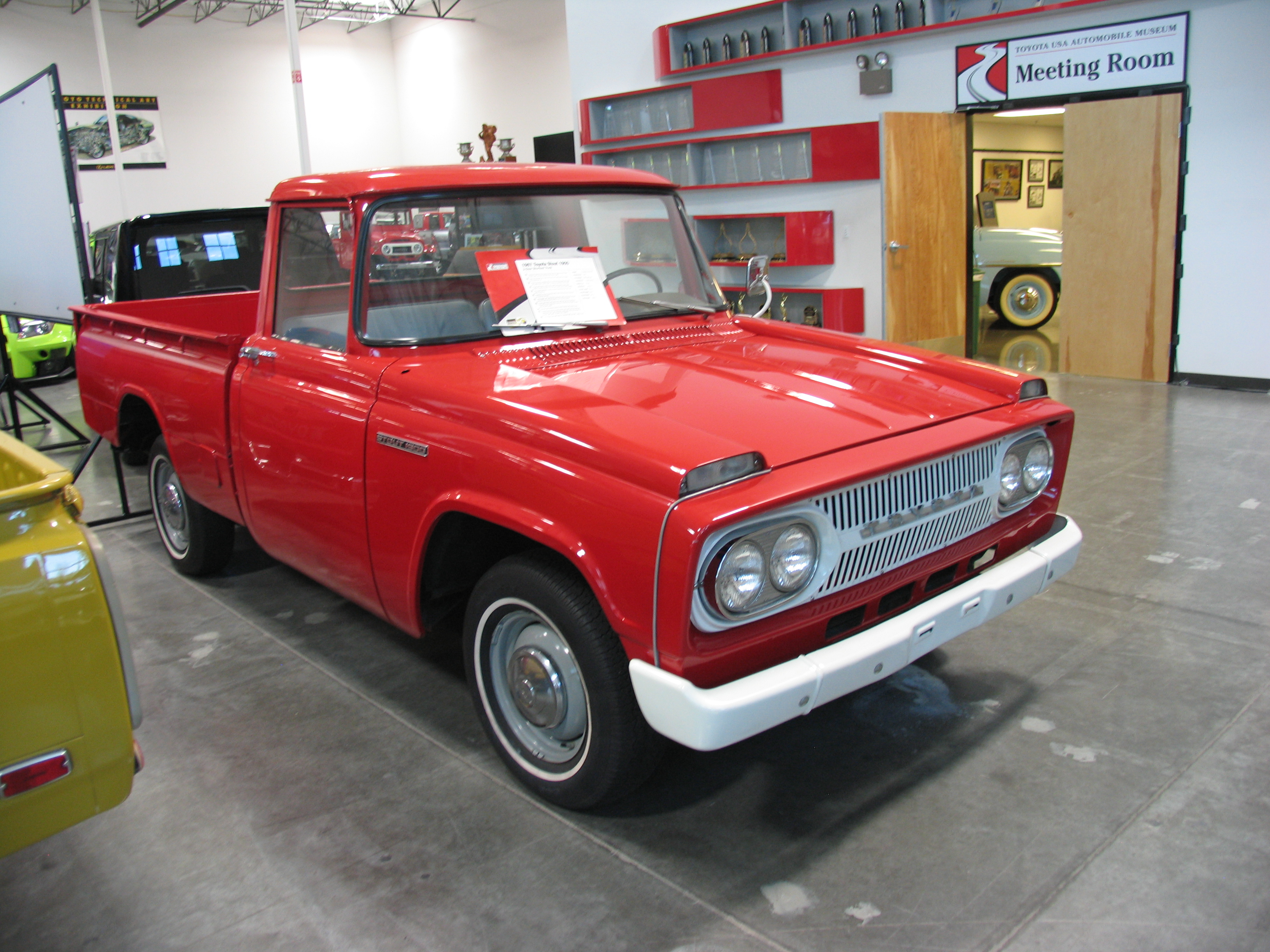
1964–1967 Toyota Stout 1900 (RK41)

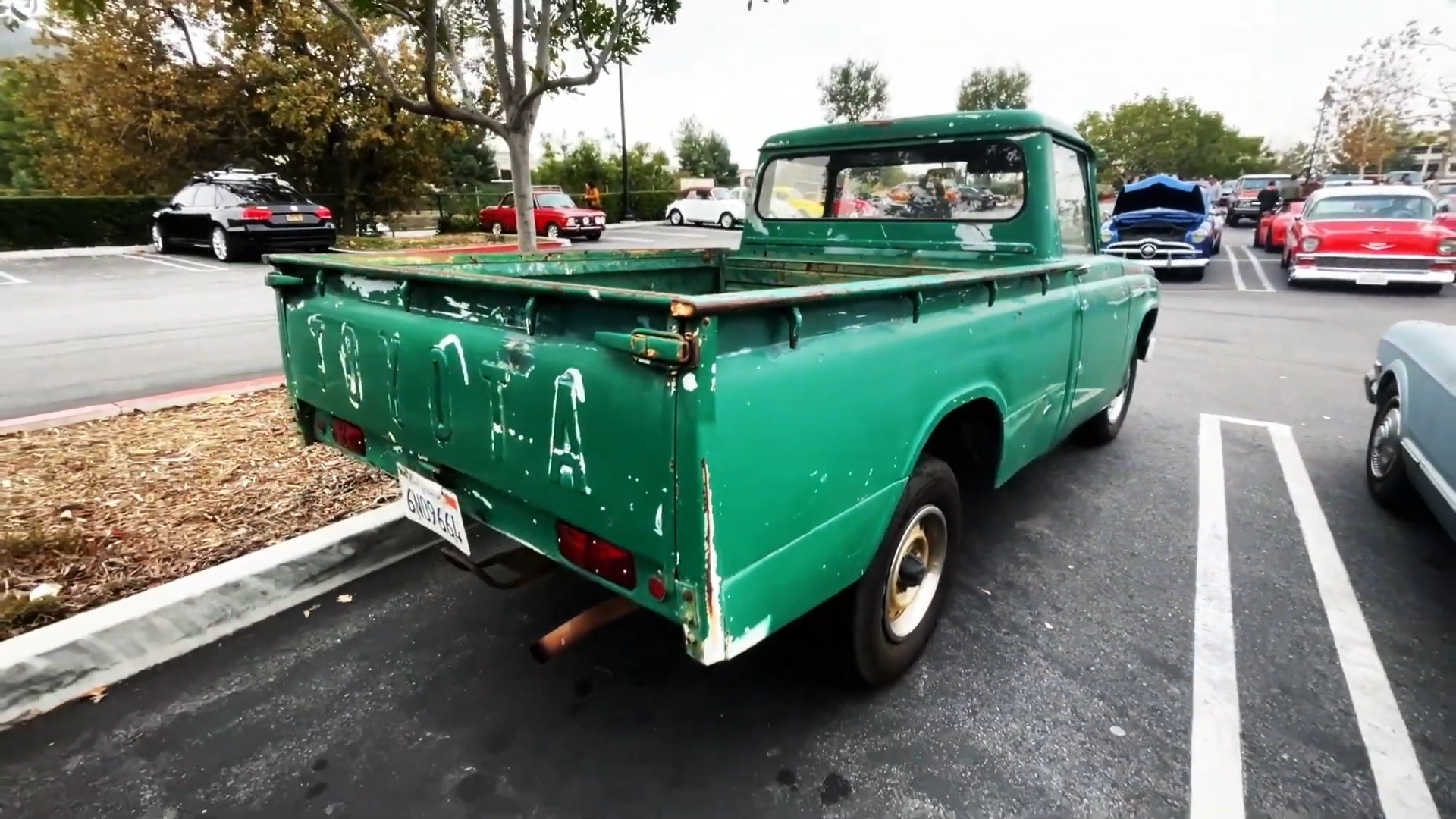
Rear view of 1964–1967 model (from 1962 for Lite Stout)

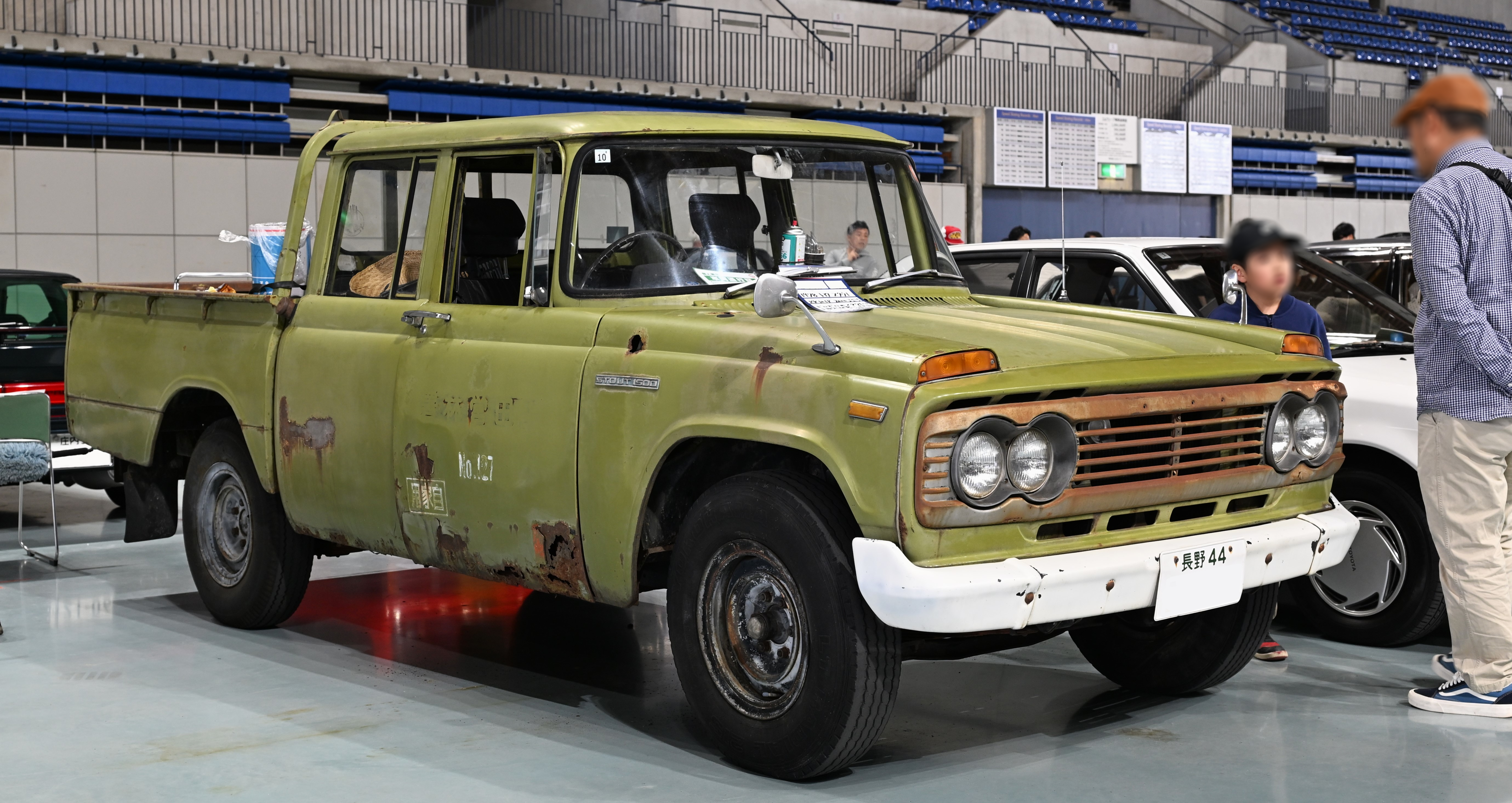
1967—1978 double cab (RK101P)

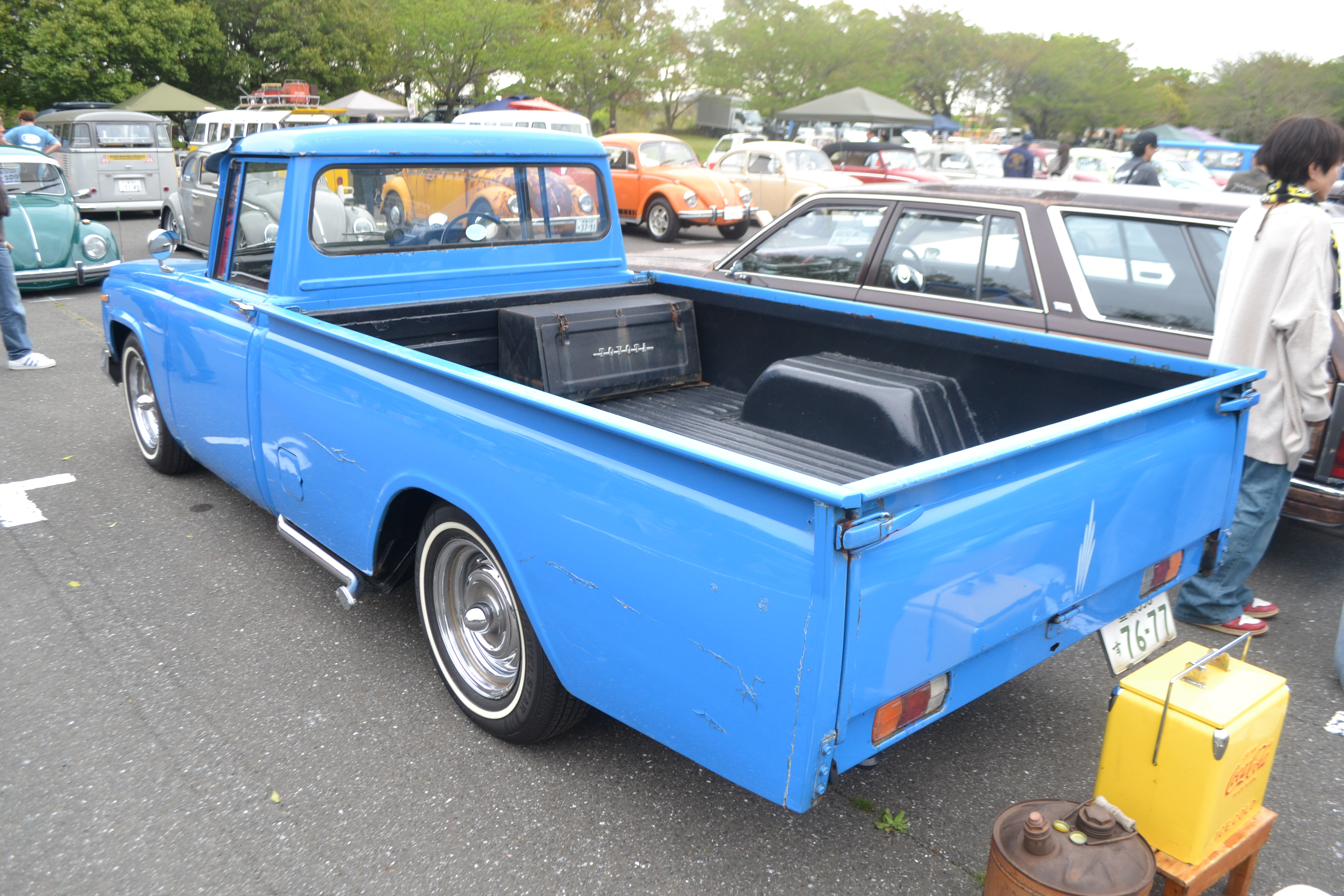
Rear view of 1967–1978 model

== Third generation (K110; 1978–2000) ==
Third generation
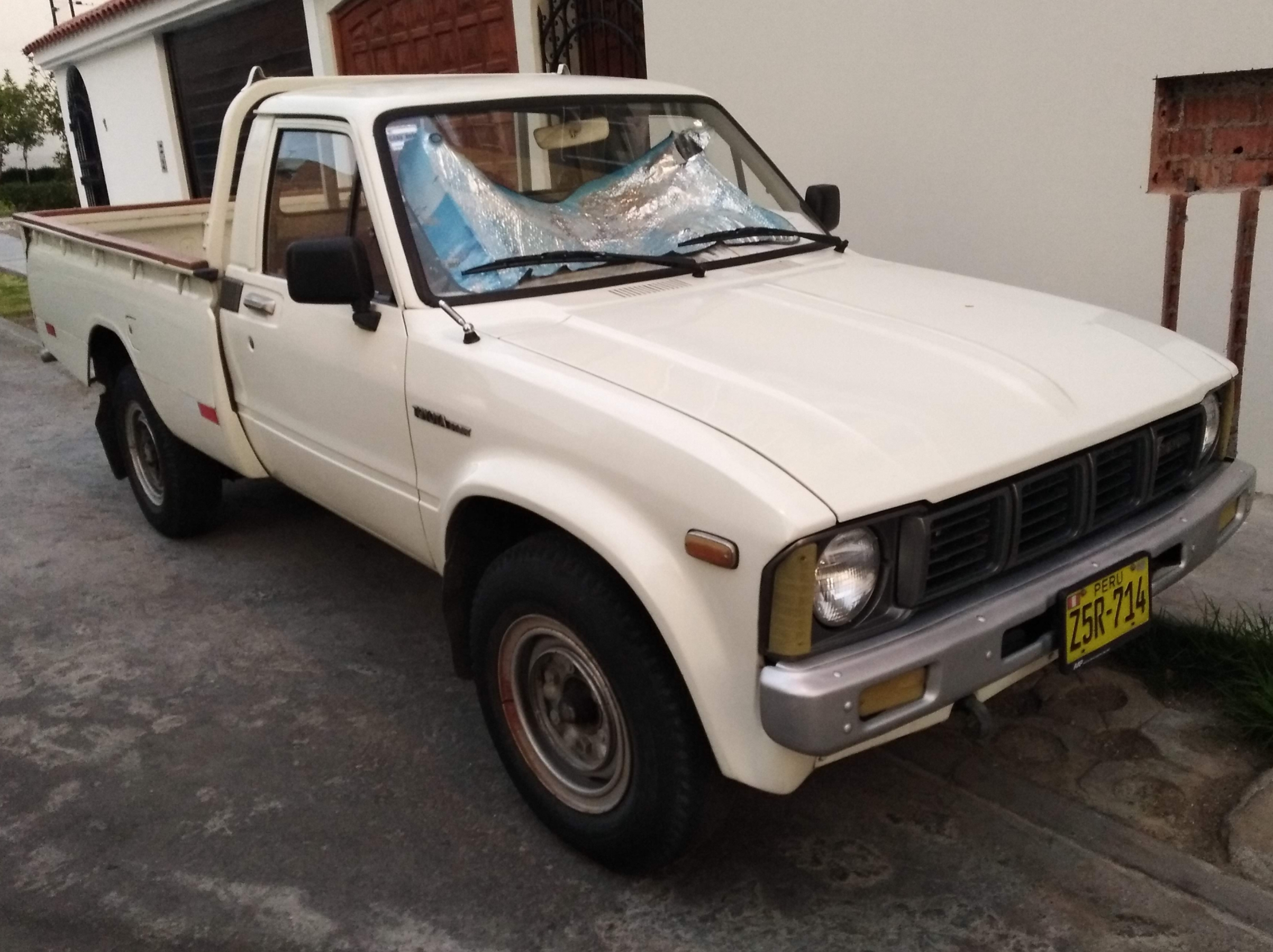
- Toyota Stout (RK101)

Overview
- Model code: K110
- Production: 1978–2000
- Assembly: Tahara Plant, Toyota City, Aichi, Japan; Gifu Auto Body Co., Ltd (from 1983); Durban, South Africa (from 1979)

Body and chassis
- Body style: 2/4-door pickup truck
- Related: Toyota Hilux (N30)

Powertrain
- Engine: 2.0 L 5R I4 (RK110/111); 2.2 L 4Y I4 (YK110)
- Transmission: 4-speed manual

Dimensions
- Wheelbase: 2,800 mm (110.2 in)
- Length: 4,675 mm (184.1 in)
- Width: 1,690 mm (66.5 in)
- Height: 1,710–1,740 mm (67.3–68.5 in)
- Curb weight: 1,360–1,445 kg (2,998–3,186 lb)

Facelifted and modernised in March 1979, the 1.5-ton Stout now used the front pressings of the smaller Hilux but still fulfilled the same role as before. The bed used the same pressings as for the previous Stouts, meaning that there was a pronounced difference between the front and rear bodywork. In South Africa, the bed of the third-generation Stout was similar to that of the South African Hilux, except it was slightly wider. Such an arrangement meant that the cab was somewhat narrower than the bed. The South African third-generation Toyota Hilux, introduced there in 1979, had a different load bed than the Japanese and international models. The rear-light clusters appeared under the tailgate instead of flanking it on the sides. The RK110 also continued to use the same 1,994 cc 5R engine. Toyota themselves state that export versions were available with the 2.2 litre 20R engine, but this is in contradiction to their own parts catalogues which only include the 5R and the 4Y. The Stout underwent a light facelift in January 1982 and became the RK111, still fitted with the 5R engine.

Body styles included a pickup (two-door, three-seater) and a double-cab pickup (four-door six-seater). The Stout was cancelled in 1989 without a successor, as Toyota's first full-size pickup, the T100 (as well as the later Tundra) were built mainly for North America, where the Stout had been replaced by the Hilux in 1968. In Japan, the third generation Stout saw very limited sales, as trucks in this weight class were nearly always of a cab-over design. Most third generation Stouts were exported. The double cab version was retired in July 1985. Stout production for Japan came to a final halt in March 1989, although production for export continued until February 2000. From September 1986, a new version (YK110) appeared in export markets (mainly Latin America), fitted with the 2.2-liter 4Y engine.

== Nameplate use with other vehicles ==
In Ecuador, the petrol engined rear-wheel-drive single cab N140 Hilux was marketed as the Stout II. In Peru, the Hilux Champ is sold as the Hilux Stout.

== See also ==
List of Toyota vehicles
