= Toyota R engine =

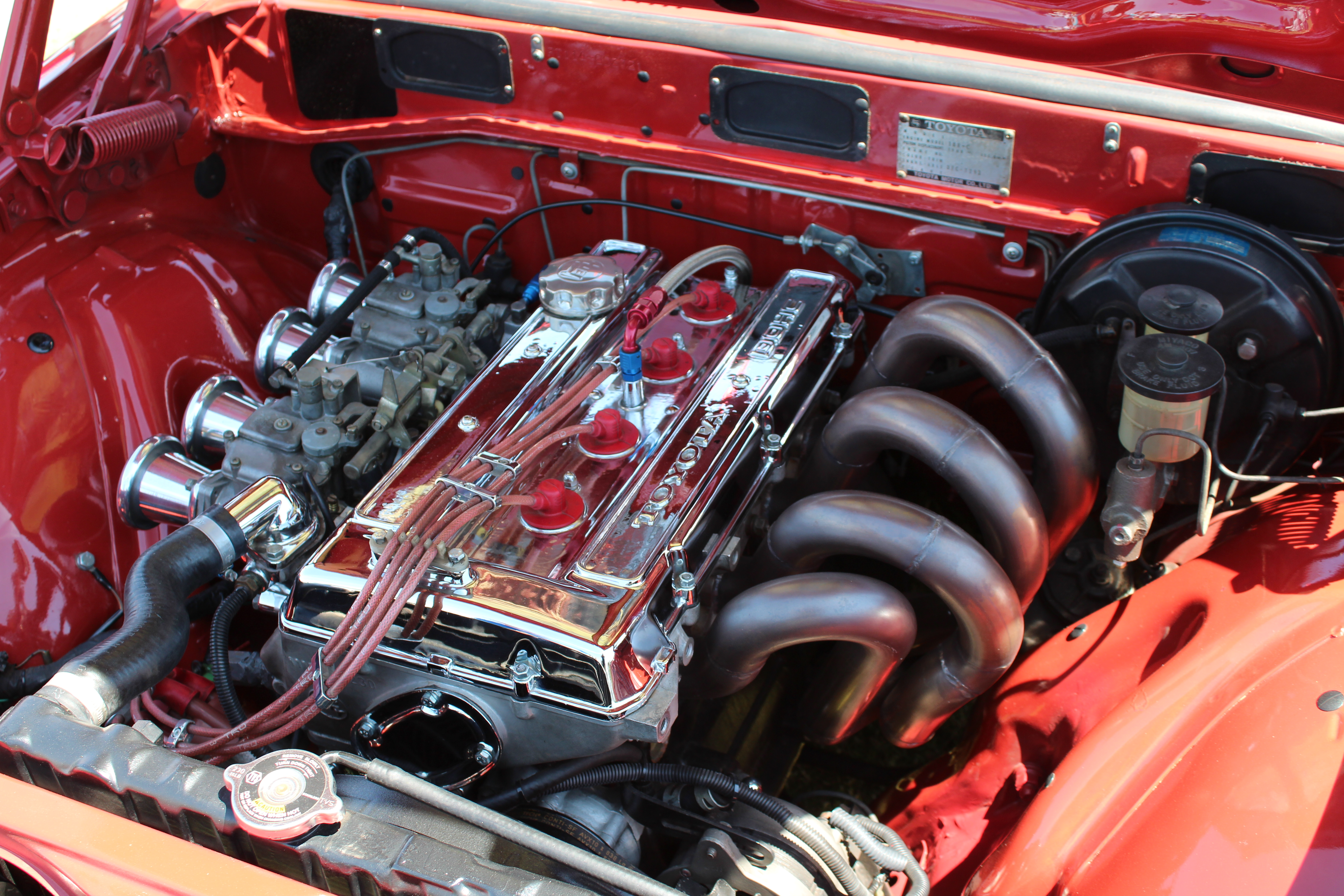
- Modified 18R-G engine in a 1974 Toyota Corona Hardtop

Overview
- Manufacturer: Toyota
- Production: 1953–1997

Layout
- Configuration: Inline-four
- Cylinder block material: Cast Iron
- Cylinder head material: Cast Iron; Aluminium
- Valvetrain: OHV 2 valves per cyl SOHC 2 valves per cyl DOHC 2 valves per cyl
- Valvetrain drive system: Timing Chain
- Compression ratio: 7.5:1-10.0:1

Combustion
- Turbocharger: Hitachi CT20 on 22R-TE only
- Fuel system: Carburetor; Multi-port fuel injection
- Fuel type: Gasoline
- Oil system: Wet sump
- Cooling system: Water-cooled

Output
- Power output: 45–101 kW (61–137 PS; 60–135 hp)
- Torque output: 108–234 N⋅m (80–173 lb⋅ft)

The Toyota R family was a series of inline-four gasoline automobile engines. Designed for longitudinal placement in such vehicles as the Celica and Hilux and in production from 1953 through 1997, usage faded out as many of Toyota's mainstream models moved to front-wheel drive. Overhead cam (OHC) versions featured a chain-driven camshaft.

== History of the R family ==
=== R ===
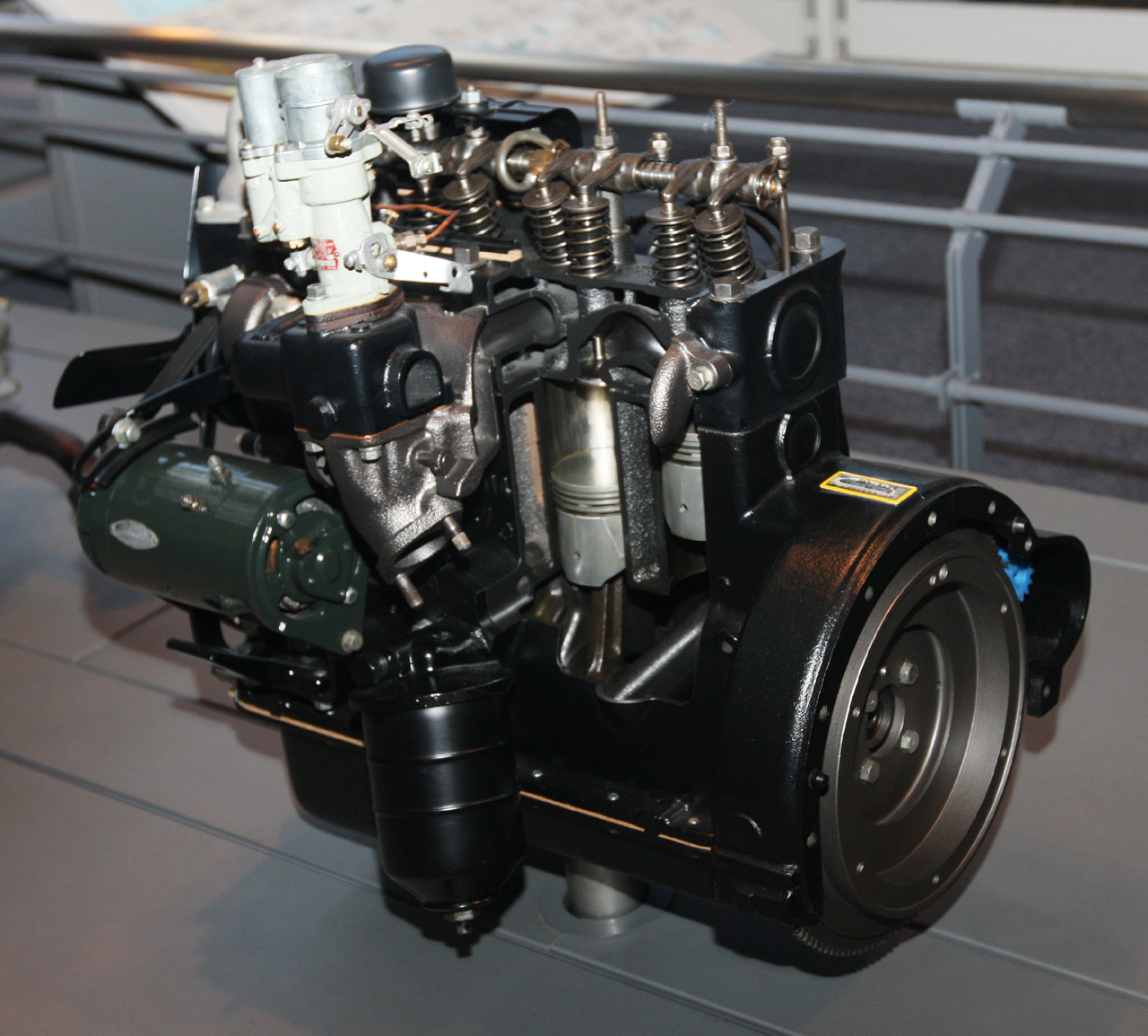
1953 Toyota R engine.

The 1.5 L (1,453 cc) R family was produced from 1953 through 1964, and was originally manufactured at the Toyota Honsha plant.

Bore and stroke was 77 mm × 78 mm (3.03 in × 3.07 in). In common with new engines of the time, it was made from cast iron (both the block and the head), water cooled, used a three bearing crank, 12V electrics and a side-mounted gear-driven camshaft controlling overhead valves via pushrods in a non-cross flow head (exhaust and inlet manifolds being on the same side of the engine). Induction was by a twin throat down-draft carburettor, the compression ratio was 8.0:1 and the total weight was 155 kg (342 lb). An LPG version, the R-LPG, was produced for the last two years.

The R engine was the Toyota engine used in the 1958 Toyota Crown, the first model to be exported to the United States. Road & Track was unimpressed with the engine on its introduction, noting that it idled quietly but was "not capable of very high revolutions per minute."

Code	Power	Torque	Years	Comments
R	45 kW (61 PS; 60 hp) at 4,400 rpm	108 N⋅m (80 lb⋅ft) at 2,600 rpm	1953–1964	
R-LPG			1962–1964	LPG

Applications:

- 1953–1955 Toyota Super
- 1955–1956 Toyota Master
- 1955–1958 Toyota Crown

=== 2R ===
The 1.5 L (1,490 cc) 2R family was produced from 1964 through 1971. It is a square engine, with bore and stroke of 78 mm (3.07 in).

Again, an LPG version, the 2R-LPG, was produced alongside the gasoline version. Production had been gradually transferred from the original Honsha plant to the new Toyota Kamigo plant in 1968.

Code	Power	Torque	Years	Comments
2R	55 kW (75 PS; 74 hp) at 5,000 rpm	116 N⋅m (86 lb⋅ft) at 2,600 rpm	1964–1969	
2R-LPG			1964–1969	LPG

Applications:

- 1964 – January 1970 Toyota Corona RT40/RT46V/RT50/RT56
- February 1970 – January 1971 Toyota Corona RT80/90/86V
- 1968–1971 Toyota Mark II
- Toyota Bus RH15B
- 1965–1967 Toyota Stout RK43/RK47
- Toyota ToyoAce PK41
- Toyota Hilux RN10

=== 3R ===
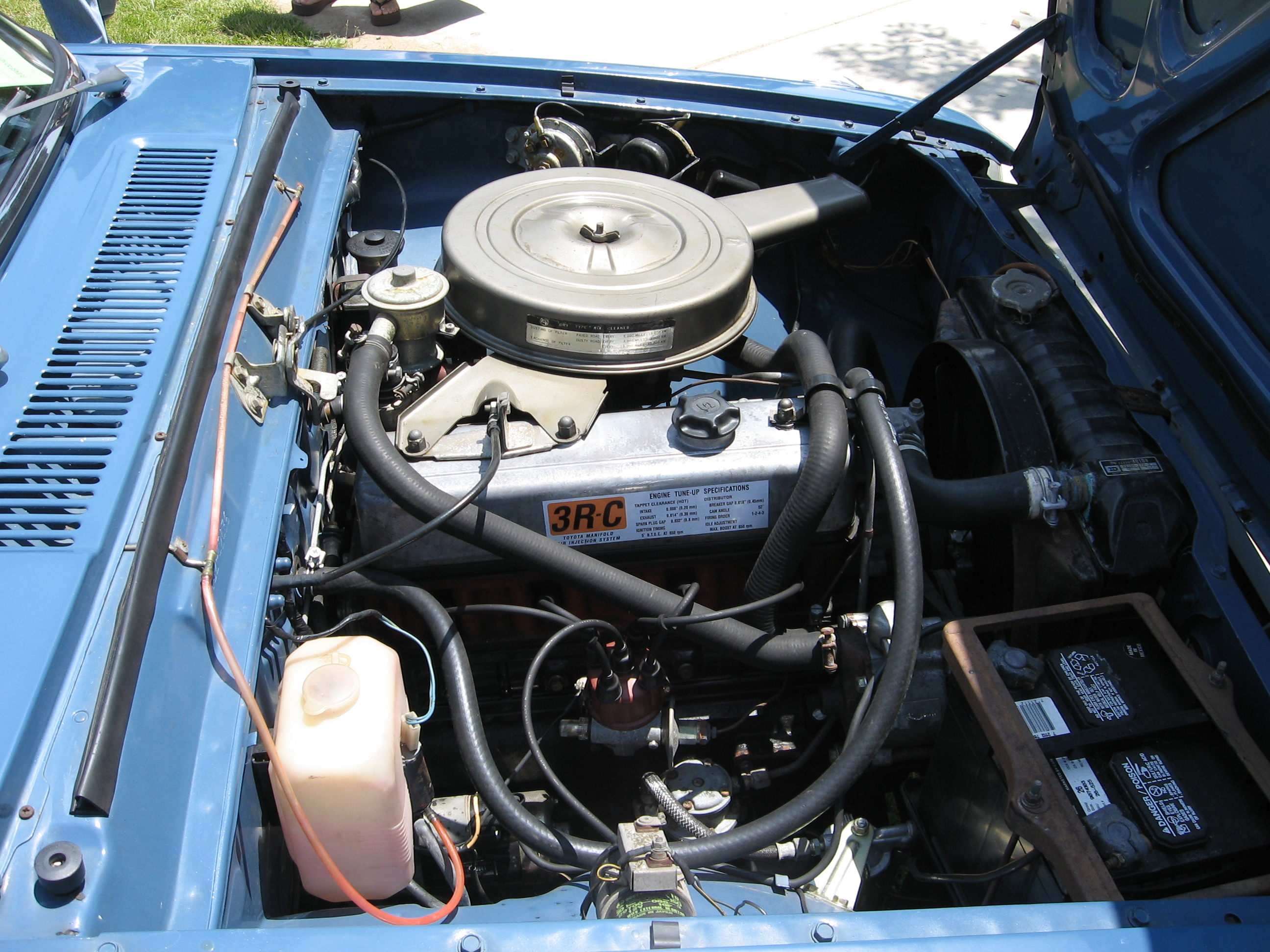
Toyota 3R-C engine

The 1.9 L (1,897 cc) 3R family was produced from 1959 through 1968. The bore is 88 mm and the stroke is 78 mm.

When introduced it had a 7.7:1 compression ratio. In 1960 the 3R was uprated to 8:1 and the 3R-B version was offered from 1960 through 1968 with the old 7.7:1 compression ratio. The 3R-C was introduced to comply with California emissions laws. The 3R-LPG variant was produced for the last five years.

Code	Power	Torque	Years	Comments
3R	59 kW (80 PS; 79 hp) at 4,600 rpm	142 N⋅m (105 lb⋅ft) at 2,600 rpm	1959–1960	7.7 CR
3R	66 kW (90 PS; 89 hp) at 5,000 rpm	142 N⋅m (105 lb⋅ft) at 3,400 rpm	1960–1968	8.0 CR
3R-B	59 kW (80 PS; 79 hp) at 4,600 rpm	142 N⋅m (105 lb⋅ft) at 2,600 rpm	1960–1968	7.7 CR
3R-C				emissions control – California
3R-LPG			1963–1968	LPG

Applications:

- 1963–1968 Toyota Dyna
- 1964–1967 Toyota Stout, originally 85 PS (63 kW; 84 hp)
- 1969–? Toyota Hilux
- 1967–1969 Toyota Corona (US)
- 1959–1967 Toyota Crown
- 1960–1967 Toyopet Masterline

=== 4R ===
The 1.6 L (1,587 cc) 4R family was produced from 1965 through 1968.

Bore and stroke was 80.5 mm × 78 mm (3.17 in × 3.07 in).

Applications:

- 1967 Toyota 1600S (Japan)

=== 5R ===
The 2.0 L (1,994 cc) 5R family was produced from 1968 through 1986. An LPG version, the 5R-LPG, was produced from 1968 through 1983.

It is a 2-valve OHV engine. Cylinder bore and stroke are 88 mm × 82 mm (3.46 in × 3.23 in). Output was 79 kW (106 hp; 107 PS) at 5200 rpm and 169 N⋅m (125 lb⋅ft) at 3000 rpm. Trucks such as the Dyna received a version tuned for torque, with a maximum power of 59 kW (79 hp; 80 PS) at 4600 rpm and torque of 145 N⋅m (107 lb⋅ft) at 3000 rpm.

Applications:

- Toyota Crown: third through sixth generation (RS50, RS60/66, RS80/RS100, and RS110). Only with LPG for taxi use in the last two generations.
- 1969-1977 Toyota Coaster RU18/RU19
- Toyota Dyna RU10/RU20/RU30
- Toyota Stout RK101
- Toyota ToyoAce RY20
- Aug 1981–? Toyota Corona sixth generation (RT131), only LPG combined with automatic transmission.

=== 6R ===
The 1.7 L (1,707 cc) 6R was produced from 1969 through 1974. Output is 107 hp (80 kW; 108 PS) at 5,300 rpm. The 6R-B was produced those same years, while the natural gas powered 6R-LPG was produced from 1970 through 1973.

Applications

- Sep 1970 – Jul 1973 Toyota Corona RT84/94
- Jan 1972 – Aug 1973 Toyota Mark II RX16V – 95 PS (70 kW)

=== 7R ===
The 1.6 L (1,591 cc) 7R was produced from 1968 through 1971 with a twin throat down-draft carburettor.
The 7R-B was produced from 1968 through 1969 with dual SU carburetors and higher compression.
The 7R-LPG was produced from 1969 through 1970.

The 7R was similar in displacement and technology to the 4R except the wider 86 mm (3.39 in) bore and shorter 68.5 mm (2.70 in) stroke of the 7R gave different power characteristics.

Code	Power	Torque	Compression	Years	Comments
7R	63 kW (86 PS; 84 hp) at 5,500 rpm	123 N⋅m (91 lb⋅ft) at 3,800 rpm	8.5	1968–1971	
7R-B	75 kW (102 PS; 101 hp) at 6,200 rpm	133 N⋅m (98 lb⋅ft) at 4,200 rpm	9.5	1968–1969	Dual SU carburettors
7R-LPG				1969–1971	LPG

Applications:

- 1968–1970 Toyota Corona (RT41 sedan, RT53 hardtop, RT54 hardtop)
- 1970 Toyota Corona (RT82 sedan)
- 1968–1970 Toyota Corona Mark II (RT6x)
- 1968–1971 Toyota Corona Mark II Wagon (RT76D)

=== 8R ===
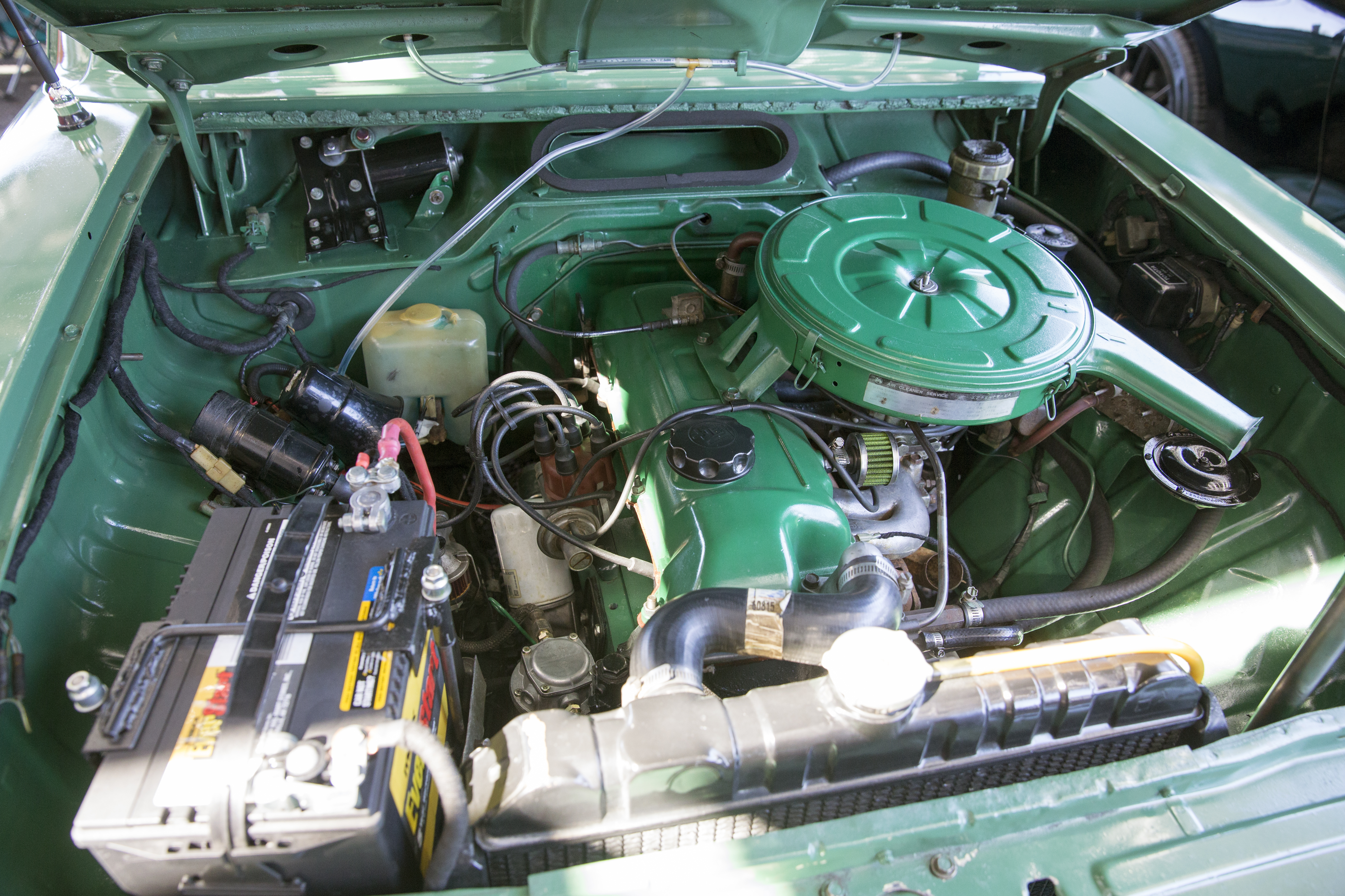
Toyota 8R engine in a Hilux

The 1.9 L (1,858 cc) 8R The engine was produced from 1968 through 1973.
Cylinder bore and stroke was 85.9 mm × 80 mm (3.38 in × 3.15 in) with a five bearing crank.
It was also available as the 8R-D, dual SU 8R-B, EFI 8R-E, Californian-spec 8R-C and DOHC 8R-G.

It was a major departure for the R family. With a 2-valve SOHC head, it impressed contemporary reviewers – Road & Track praised its quietness and free-revving nature.

The 8R engine has a closed chamber head vs the open chamber of the 18R-C. The 8R-B has dual side draft SU-type Aisan carburettors with the float bowl under the body and vacuum activated power valves with strangle plates for chokes and liquid cooled intake with a balance tube.

Toyota upped the ante again with the DOHC (but still 2-valve) 8R-G, produced from 1969 through 1972. From 1969 to Feb 1971 it was known as the 10R, but along with a removal of the tensioner gear in the interest of quieter operation, it was renamed the 8R-G to reflect the decision that twin-cam engines were henceforth to be identified by a "-G" suffix. 4,931 twin cam engines were built, all installed in the Toyota Corona Mark II (RT72/75) 1900 GSS. The 10R/8R-G weighed in at 170 kg (370 lb) and as such was both lighter and more compact than its less powerful predecessor the 9R

Code	Power	Torque	Compression	Years	Comments
8R	81 kW (109 hp; 110 PS) at 5,500 rpm	153 N⋅m (113 lb⋅ft) at 3,800 rpm	9.0	1968–1972	
8R-B	82 kW (110 hp; 111 PS) at 6,000 rpm	152 N⋅m (112 lb⋅ft) at 4,000 rpm	10.0	1969–1971	Dual SU carburetors
8R-D					
8R-E					EFI
8R-C	81 kW (109 hp; 110 PS) at 5,500 rpm	174 N⋅m (128 lb⋅ft) at 3,600 rpm	9.0		Californian emissions controls
8R-G	104 kW (139 hp; 141 PS) at 6,400 rpm	166 N⋅m (122 lb⋅ft) at 5,200 rpm		1969–1972	DOHC, dual side-draft carburettors

Applications:

- 1970–1971 Toyota Hilux, 72 kW (97 hp; 98 PS)
- 1971–1973 Toyota Corona 1900 hardtop
- Toyota Corona Mark II RT72 Corona Mark II 1900 hardtop
- Toyota Corona Mark II RT72 Corona Mark II 1900 hardtop GSS (8R-G)

=== 9R ===
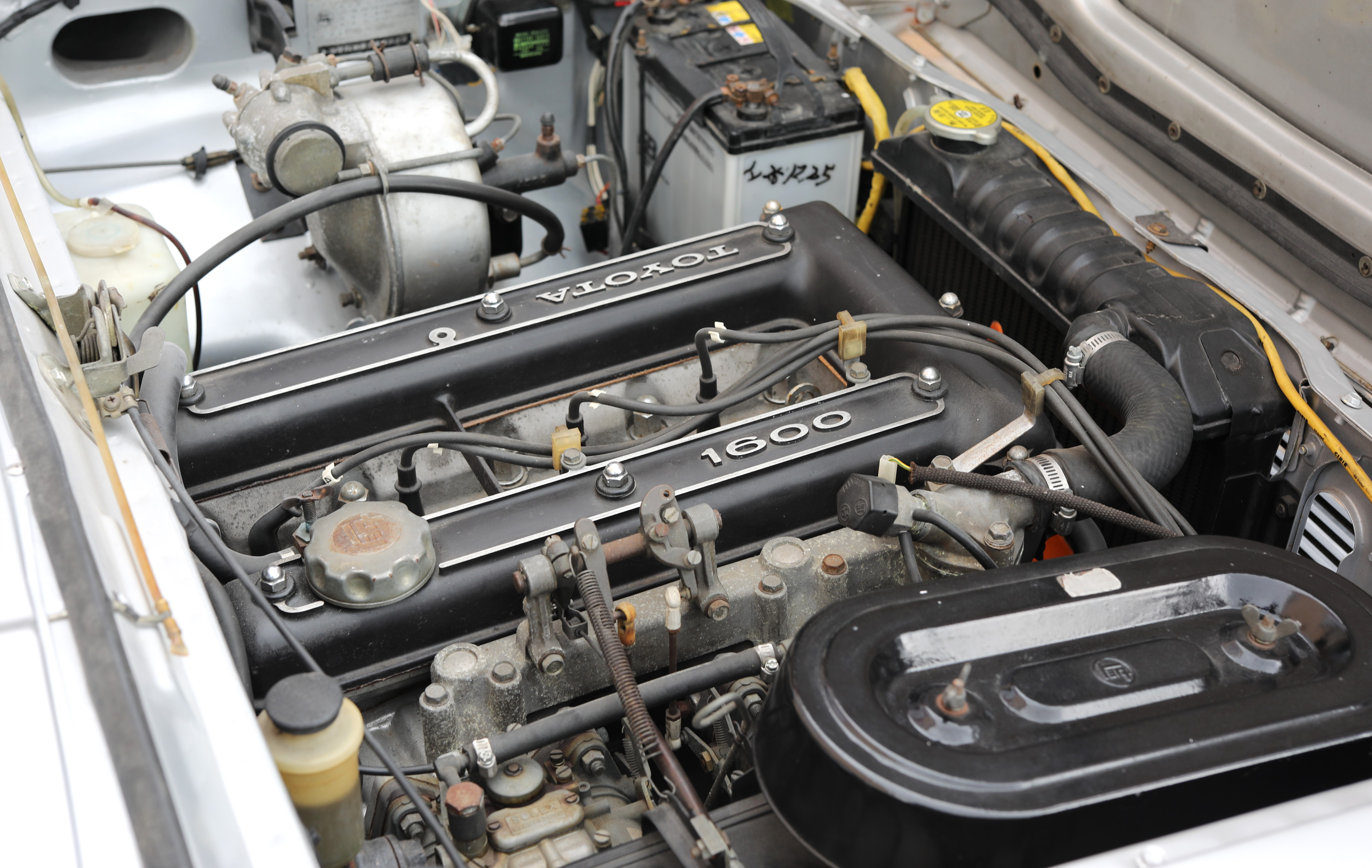
Toyota 9R engine in a Corona

The 1.6 L (1,587 cc) 9R was produced from 1967 through 1968. Bore and stroke 80.5 mm × 78 mm (3.17 in × 3.07 in).

It was essentially a 4R with a DOHC head designed by Yamaha. The cam lobes activated the valves directly via a bucket over shim arrangement. This same arrangement was used on the 2M, 8R-G, 10R, 18R-G, 2T-G, 4A-GE and 3T-GTE engines (all designed by Yamaha).

Output was 82 kW (110 hp; 111 PS) at 6,200 rpm and 136 N⋅m (100 lb⋅ft) at 5,000 rpm. It was a 2-valve DOHC design with two Solex carburettors and weighed 174 kg (384 lb). A total of 2,229 9R engines were built.

Applications:

- Toyota Corona (RT55) 1600 GT hardtop

=== 10R ===
The twin cam 1.9 L (1,858 cc) 10R was produced from 1967 through Feb 1971, when it was renamed the 8R-G. The later 8R-G version did not receive a timing chain tensioner in an effort to make it more silent.

Output was 104 kW (139 hp; 141 PS) at 6,400 rpm and 166 N⋅m (122 lb⋅ft) at 5,200 rpm.

Applications:

- Toyota Corona Mark II RT75 Corona Mark II GSS

=== 12R ===
The 1.6 L (1,587 cc) 12R was produced from 1969 through 1988. It was also built in the Philippines as the 12R-M, by Toyota's local affiliate Delta Motors Corporation.
Technical Specs (Finnish Owner's Manual from 1973 Corona Mark 1)
– Four cylinder, 4-stroke, OHV
– Bore × stroke: 80.5 mm × 78 mm (3.17 in × 3.07 in)
– Compression ratio: 8.5:1
– Maximum power: 90 PS (66 kW; 89 hp) at 5400 rpm SAE

The 12R-LPG, was produced from 1969 through 1983.
Technical Specs: 1975 59 kW (80 PS; 79 hp) redline 4,400 rpm

Applications:

- 1971–1978 Toyota Corona
- 1971–1972 Toyota Hilux
- 1977 Toyota Hiace
- 1975 Toyota Hiace Commercial Camper
- 1976 Daihatsu Taft (F20)
- Delta Mini Cruiser/Explorer

=== 16R ===
The OHC 1.8 L (1,808 cc) 16R was produced from 1974 through 1980. Power output as mounted in a 1980 Mark II was 105 PS (77 kW; 104 hp) at 5,600 rpm, while a twin carburetted version produced 110 PS (81 kW; 108 hp) at 6,000 rpm. The 16R-B was produced for the first two years. There was also a 16R-J version for various commercial vehicle applications.

Applications:

- October 1975 – February 1977 Toyota Carina RA10/16
- Toyota Mark II Van RX37V (16R-J), 95 PS (70 kW; 94 hp)
- Toyota Corona RT102/112/117 (sedan/hardtop/wagon)
- Toyota Corona RT108V (van; 16R-J)
- Toyota Corona RT137V (van; 16R-J)
- Toyota HiAce RH12/14/17/41 (16R-J)

=== 18R ===
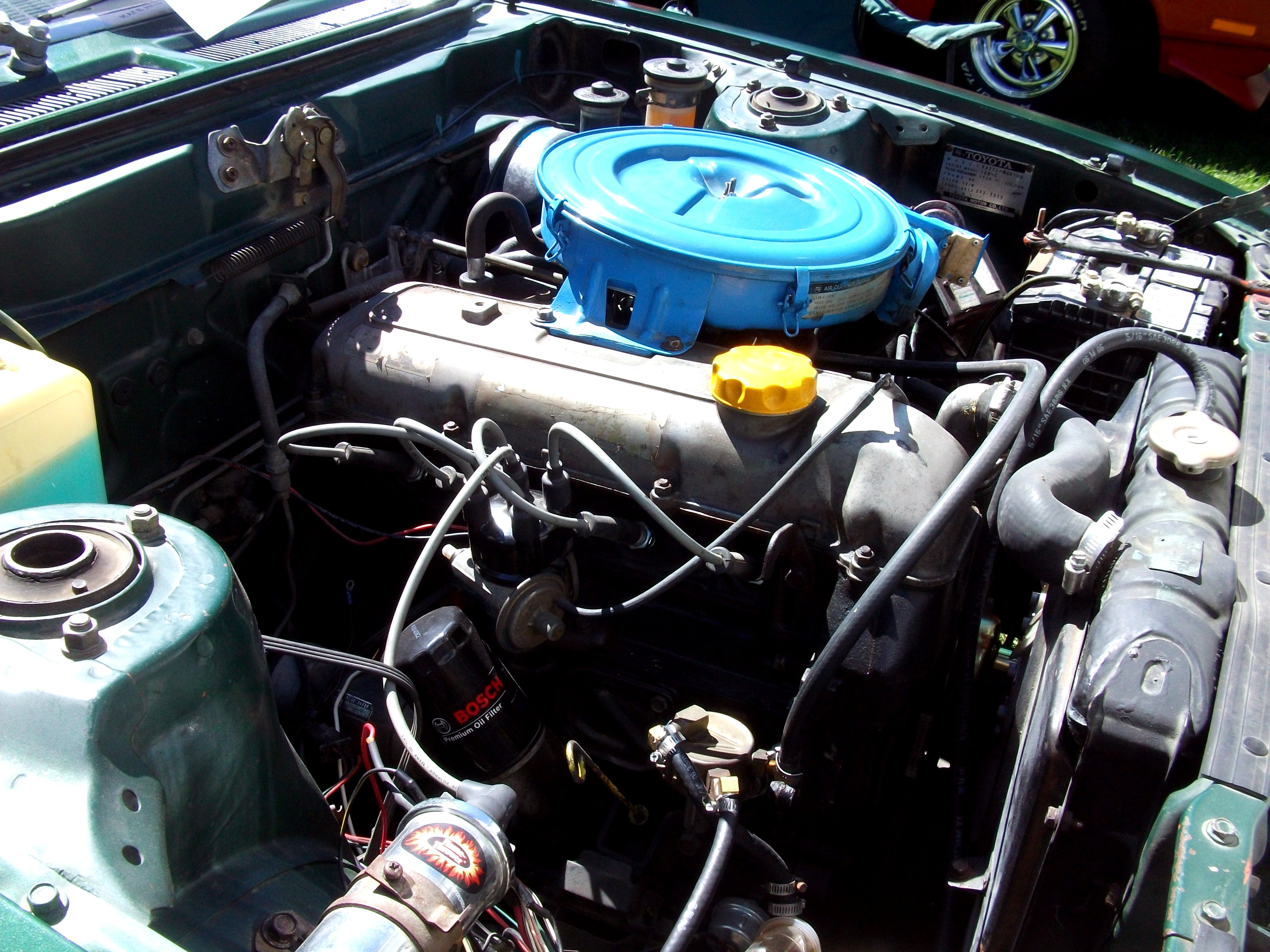
Toyota 18R-C engine in a Celica

The 18R series shared a 2.0 L (1,968 cc) block; cylinder bore and stroke was 88.5 mm × 80 mm (3.48 in × 3.15 in).

The 2-valve, SOHC versions were as follows:

Code	Power	Torque	Years	Comments
18R	78 kW (106 PS; 105 hp); 65 kW (88 PS; 87 hp) at 5000 rpm	142–145 N⋅m (105–107 lb⋅ft); 145 N⋅m (107 lb⋅ft) at 3600 rpm	1971–1981 ?	non-emissions Hilux
18R-C	72 kW (98 PS; 97 hp) at 5500 rpm	143–145 N⋅m (105–107 lb⋅ft) at 3600 rpm	1971–1981	emissions control – worldwide (Californian Standards)
18R-U	75 kW (102 PS; 101 hp) at 5500 rpm	152 N⋅m (112 lb⋅ft) at 3600 rpm	1975–1978	emissions control – Japan
18R-E	84–96 kW (114–131 PS; 113–129 hp) at 5600 rpm	172 N⋅m (127 lb⋅ft) at 4400 rpm	1974–1975	EFI, Japan only

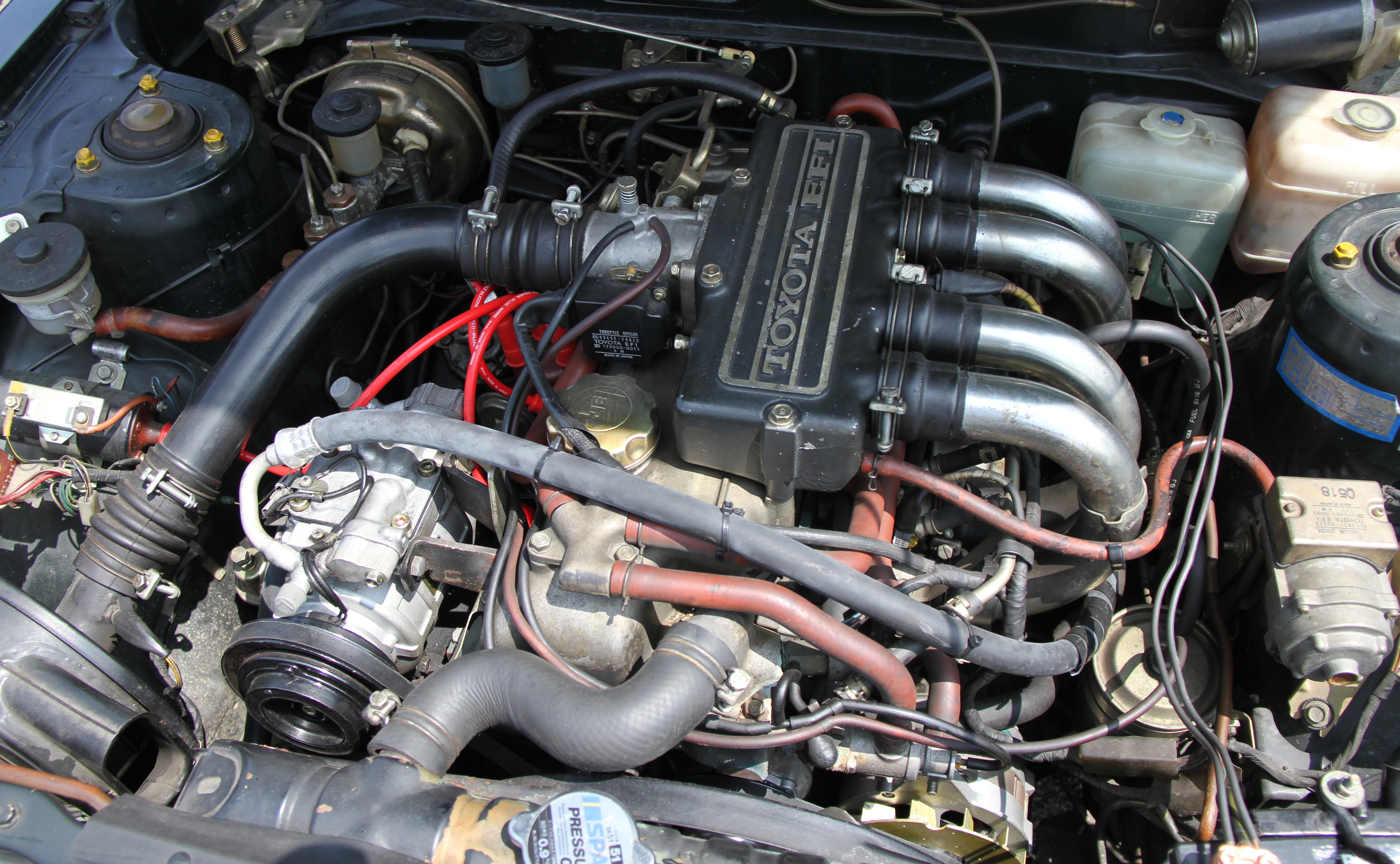
Japan only 18R-E in a Carina

Applications:

- 18R/18R-C/18R-U/18R-E
  - 1972 Toyota Corona 2000
  - 1972 Toyota Corona 2000 MK. II
  - 1972 Toyota Celica 2000
  - 197X Toyota Cressida 2000/Gen1
  - Toyota Hilux, 89 PS
- 18R-C
  - 1972–1974 Toyota Hilux, 80.5 kW (109 PS; 108 hp)
  - 1974–1981 Toyota Celica 2000
  - 1980–1981 Toyota Corona Liftback (RT132, Australia)

==== 18R-G ====
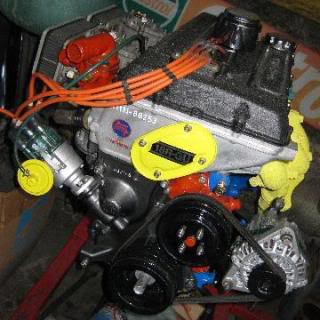
18R-G on an engine stand

The 2-valve DOHC 18R-G and its variations were produced from 1973 to 1982, replacing the 8R-G and providing a performance engine which took advantage of the entire 2-litre limit of Japan's "small car" class. While most 18R-Gs had a head designed and made by Yamaha, a very few had Toyota heads. Yamaha's tuning-fork logo can be seen on the Yamaha heads. Except for the head and related timing components, most parts were shared or interchangeable with the SOHC 18R. Combustion chambers were hemispheric.

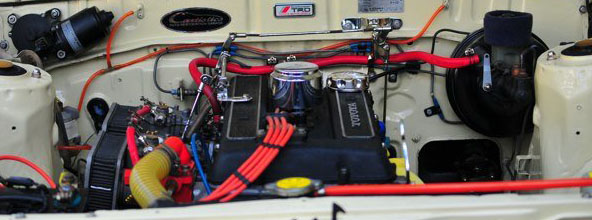
18R-G in an engine bay

In 1975, air injection was added to the Japan-market 18R-GR for improved emissions. This used Solex carburettors. A fuel injected and catalyzed Japan-market version, the 18R-GEU, was produced from 1978 through 1982. There was also a catalyzed carburetted version, the 18R-GU.

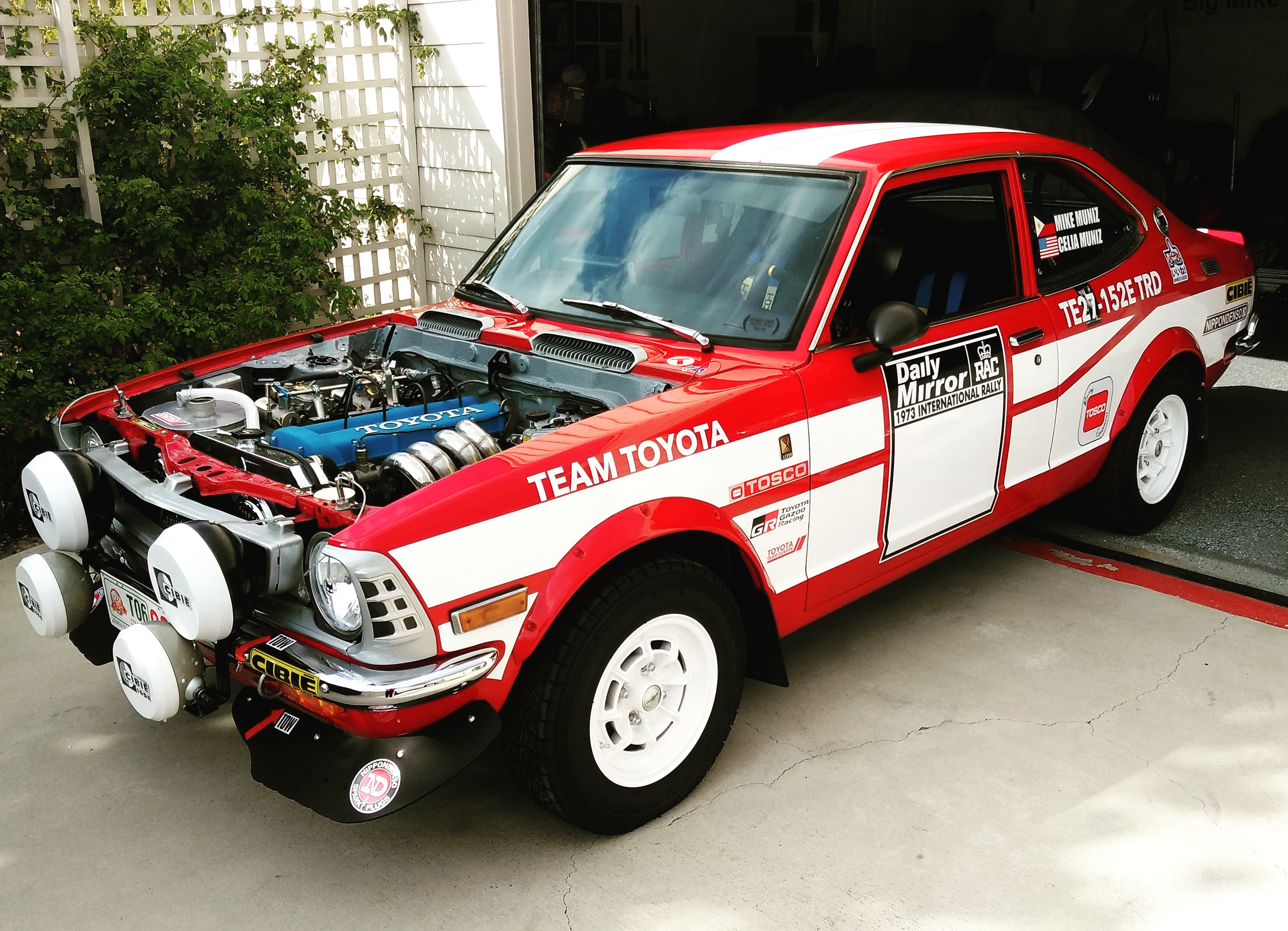
1973 TE27 Rally Car with a 152E TRD Race Engine

Code	Power	Torque	Years	Weight	Comments
18R-G	145 PS (107 kW; 143 hp) at 6400 rpm	18 kg⋅m (177 N⋅m; 130 lb⋅ft) at 5200 rpm	1972–1981	170 kg (375 lb)	
18R-GR	140 PS (103 kW; 138 hp) at 6400 rpm	17.2 kg⋅m (169 N⋅m; 124 lb⋅ft) at 4800 rpm	1973–1975		low compression for regular fuel
18R-GU	130 PS (96 kW; 128 hp) at 5800 rpm	16.5 kg⋅m (162 N⋅m; 119 lb⋅ft) at 4800 rpm	1975–1978	182 kg (401 lb)	emissions control – Japan.
18R-GEU	135 PS (99 kW; 133 hp) at 5800 rpm	17.5 kg⋅m (172 N⋅m; 127 lb⋅ft) at 4800 rpm	1978–1982	166 kg (366 lb)	EFI, emissions control (Japan).

Applications:

- 1973–1981 Toyota Celica GT 2000
- 1982–1983 Toyota Celica GT 2000 (RA63)
- 1974–1983 Toyota Carina GT 2000
- 1978–1983 Toyota Celica Camry GT 2000
- 1973–1982 Toyota Corona GT 2000

==== 152E ====
Competition versions of the 18R-G and -GE include those used in rally Celicas of the period, one of which finished second in the 1977 RAC Rally. These had 4-valve heads and were called 152E, they were of 89 mm × 80 mm (3.50 in × 3.15 in) bore and stroke and 1,995 or 1,998 cc (121.7 or 121.9 cu in) (depending on the source). The Group 4 rally version of the 152E had two twin-choke carburettors, and developed 240 PS (177 kW; 237 hp) at 9000 rpm. Higher tuned engines developed as much as 300 PS (221 kW; 296 hp) at 9,200 rpm. German racing team Schnitzer also developed a turbocharged silhouette racing version of the Celica, to take on the Porsche 935. With a KKK turbocharger, the Group 5 Celica developed 560 PS (412 kW; 552 hp) but reliability was less than satisfactory.

=== 19R ===
The 2-valve SOHC 2.0 L (1,968 cc) 19R was produced from 1974 through 1977. Cylinder bore and stroke was 88.5 mm × 80 mm (3.48 in × 3.15 in). Its dimensions are the same as of the 18R, but it featured TTC-V, Toyota's licensed version of Honda's CVCC stratified charge combustion system. Output is 80 PS (59 kW; 79 hp). The 19R was a short-lived experiment by Toyota, and was only offered in Japanese market cars.

Applications:

- 1974–1977 Carina RA13/RA31
- 1974–1977 Corona RT103/RT123

=== 20R ===
The 2-valve SOHC 2.2 L (2,190 cc) 20R was produced from 1975 through 1980. Cylinder bore and stroke was 88.5 mm × 89 mm (3.48 in × 3.50 in). Aluminum alloy heads were used.

Initial output was 72 kW (97 hp; 98 PS) at 4800 rpm (90 hp (67 kW; 91 PS) in California) and 162 N⋅m (119 lb⋅ft) at 2,800 rpm. Power was down slightly from 1978 through 1979 at 71 kW (95 hp; 97 PS) at 4800 rpm and 165 N⋅m (122 lb⋅ft) at 2400 rpm. The final version, from 1979 through 1980, was down again at 67 kW (90 hp; 91 PS) at 4800 rpm (still at 95 hp (71 kW; 96 PS) in Canada) and 165 N⋅m (122 lb⋅ft) at 2400 rpm.

The 20R and subsequent models featured important design changes relative to the earlier SOHC R-series engines. The head was changed from a reverse-flow to a cross-flow type with hemispherical combustion chambers and shorter valve rockers. The timing chain was strengthened. The lower block bearings were strengthened against wear, safeguarding oil pressure, and the stroke was lengthened. The changes increased torque substantially and shifted peak power and torque towards the lower speed range. The later R series engines did much to establish Toyota's reputation for reliability, which had previously been indifferent at best.

Applications:

- 1975–1980 Toyota Hilux
- 1975–1980 Toyota Celica (U.S. Version)
- 1975–1980 Toyota Corona (U.S. Version)
- Toyota Stout (RK110/111)
- Toyota Coaster (RB11)

=== 21R ===
The 2-valve SOHC 2.0 L (1,972 cc) 21R was produced from 1978 through 1987. Cylinder bore and stroke are 84 mm × 89 mm (3.31 in × 3.50 in).

Output for export markets, largely unconstrained by emissions, was 74 kW (100 PS; 99 hp) DIN at 5,000 rpm and 154 N⋅m (114 lb⋅ft) at 4,000 rpm. Air injection and federally compliant emissions equipment for the 21R-C (1982–1985) dropped power down to 67 kW (91 PS; 90 hp) SAE net at 5,000 rpm. The air-injected Japanese version, the 21R-U, produces 77 kW (105 PS; 104 hp) JIS at 5,200 rpm and 162 N⋅m (119 lb⋅ft) at 3,600 rpm but dropped to 74 kW (100 PS; 99 hp) at 5,400 rpm and 154 N⋅m (114 lb⋅ft) at 4,000 rpm in 1986.

Applications:

- 1978–1982 Toyota Carina RA46-A, RA56-A
- 1978–1981 Toyota Celica RA46-B
- 1981–1983 Toyota Celica RA60-B
- 1978–1983 Toyota Corona RT133
- 1978–1980 Toyota Cressida/Corona Mark II/Chaser RX40, RX41
- 1980–1983 Toyota Cressida/Corona Mark II RX60
- 1979–198? Toyota HiAce Wagon RH23G

=== 22R ===
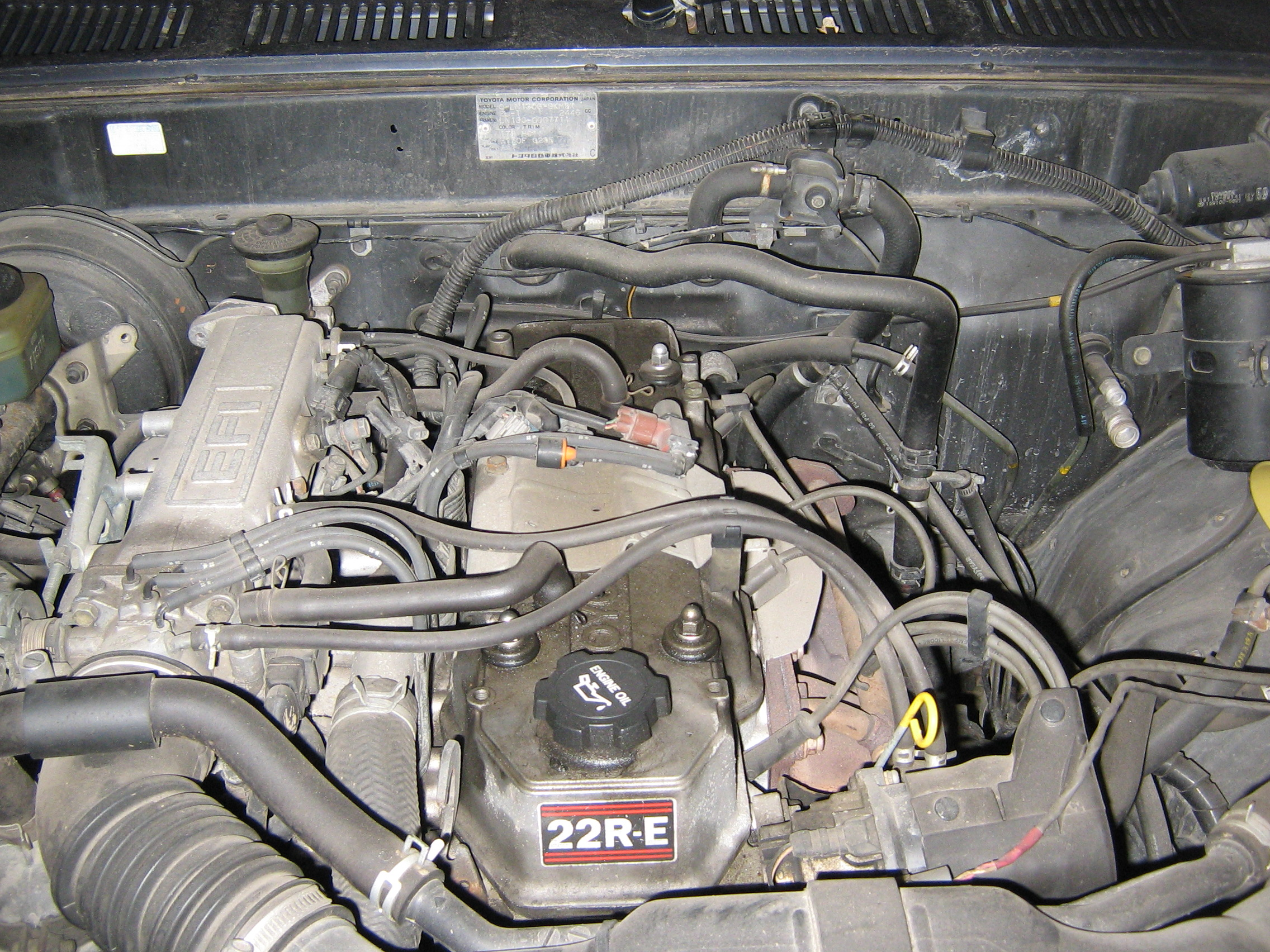
22R-E engine fitted in a 1989 Hilux Surf

The 2-valve SOHC 2.4 L (2,366 cc) 22R was introduced in 1980 (for the 1981 model year) and produced until 1997.

Cylinder bore and stroke was 92 mm × 89 mm (3.62 in × 3.50 in).

Initial output was 72 kW (97 hp; 98 PS) at 4,800 rpm and 174 N⋅m (128 lb⋅ft) at 2,800 rpm. By 1990 the 22R was producing 81 kW (109 hp; 110 PS) at 5,000 rpm and 187 N⋅m (138 lb⋅ft) at 3,400 rpm.

The first fuel injected 22R-E engines appeared in August 1982. Output of these engines is commonly rated at 78 kW (105 hp; 106 PS) at 4,800 rpm and 185 N⋅m (136 lb⋅ft) at 2,800 rpm.

In 1985, the engine was significantly reworked, output was up to 84 kW (113 hp; 114 PS) at 4,800 rpm and 190 N⋅m (140 lb⋅ft) at 3,600 rpm. Many parts from the newer 22R/R-E are not compatible with those from the older pre-1985 engine. Non-compatible parts include the cylinder head, block, pistons and many of the associated parts such as the timing chain and cover, and water and oil pumps (although the oil pump internals are the same). These changes also affected the 22R, therefore one can consider the 85–95 22R-E as a fuel injected version of the 85–90 22R with only minor differences, if any.

Toyota swapped the dual-row timing chain used in older engines for a single-row chain with plastic guides in 1982 for the 1983 model year. The new system reduced drag on the engine but introduced a new maintenance problem. After about 100,000 miles (160,000 km) of operation, the chain may stretch to the point that the hydraulic-operated chain tensioner cannot take up any more slack. The timing chain then impacts the plastic driver's side chain guide, breaking it within a short period of time and creating a noticeable chattering sound in the front of the engine, especially when cold. If the engine continues to be operated without the guide restraint, the chain will vibrate excessively on the driver's side and stretch rapidly. The result is any of several failure modes.

First, the loose chain will reduce ignition timing accuracy, which usually results in noticeably rough running. Second, it may jump a tooth on the drive sprocket or break entirely, which almost always results in major damage to an interference engine. Third, the stretched chain can slap against the side of the timing cover and wear through the metal into the coolant passage behind the water pump, resulting in major damage to both the oil and cooling systems (sometimes mis-diagnosed as a head gasket failure). The damaged aluminum timing cover is difficult to repair effectively and is typically replaced after such an event. Aftermarket timing-chain kits for the 22R/R-E typically include steel-backed guides that do not readily break even after the initial chain stretching has occurred, permitting the chain to run beyond the 100,000 miles (160,000 km) point without further incident. However, some Toyota mechanics will recommend the plastic guides as they will break when the timing chain is stretched; When the guides break a noticeable chatter is heard from the timing chain slapping on the cover, warning the operator of a worn timing chain.

The turbocharged 22R-TE (sold from late 1985 through 1988) produced 101 kW (135 hp; 137 PS) at 4,800 rpm and 234 N⋅m (173 lb⋅ft) at 2,800 rpm.

These engines are extremely well known for their durability, decent fuel efficiency and good low to mid range torque.

However, its weakness is high-end power. The 22R has a large displacement and a strong block, but its comparatively long stroke and restrictive head limit its use in high revving applications. Thus, the Toyota 18R-G, 2T-G, 4A-GE and 3S-GE 4-cylinder engines are better suited for performance applications.

A popular modification to the early 22R is to use a 20R head. Contrary to popular lore, the 20R head does not have smaller combustion chambers. The misunderstanding originated when the 22R came out and an advantage was its higher compression ratio, so swapping a 20R block with a 22R, there was a compression increase. The 20R head has straight ports, so can flow better than the 22R head, improving high RPM power. The 20R head is a simple bolt-on modification for the pre-1985 block, but also requires the use of the 20R intake manifold, making it almost impossible (there's a lot of matching necessary) to use with the 22R-E EFI system. For blocks 1985 and onwards, further modifications are required.

Code	Power	Torque	Years	Comments
22R	72 kW (97 hp; 98 PS) at 4,800 rpm	174 N⋅m (128 lb⋅ft) at 2,800 rpm	1981–1990	carb, dual row timing chain (MY 1981–1982) carb, single row timing chain (MY 1983–1990)
22R	81 kW (109 hp; 110 PS) at 5,000 rpm	187 N⋅m (138 lb⋅ft) at 3,400 rpm	1990–1995	
22R-E	78 kW (105 hp; 106 PS) at 4,800 rpm	185 N⋅m (136 lb⋅ft) at 2,800 rpm	1983–1984	EFI, single row timing chain
22R-E	84 kW (113 hp; 114 PS) at 4,800 rpm	190 N⋅m (140 lb⋅ft) at 3,600 rpm	1985–1997	EFI, single row timing chain
22R-TE	101 kW (135 hp; 137 PS) at 4,800 rpm	234 N⋅m (173 lb⋅ft) at 2,800 rpm	1986–1988	turbocharged, single row timing chain

Applications:

- 22R
  - 1981-1982 Toyota Corona
  - 1981–1997 Toyota Hilux
  - 1981–1984 Toyota Celica
  - 1991 Toyota Cressida
  - 1981–1995 Toyota Pickup
  - 1984 Toyota 4Runner
  - 1984–1989 Toyota Land Cruiser II, Bundera
- 22R-E
  - 1985–1995 Toyota Hilux
  - 1983–1985 Toyota Celica
  - 1983–1987 Toyota Corona RT142
  - 1984–1995 Toyota Pickup
  - 1985–1995 Toyota 4Runner
  - 1989–1997 Volkswagen Taro
- 22R-TE
  - late 1985–1988 Toyota Hilux
  - 1986–1987 Toyota 4Runner

== See also ==
- List of Toyota engines
- 22R Tech Notes (Toysport)
- Toyota 20R engines: details and photos (Toyoland)
