= Toyopet Master =

Toyopet Master series
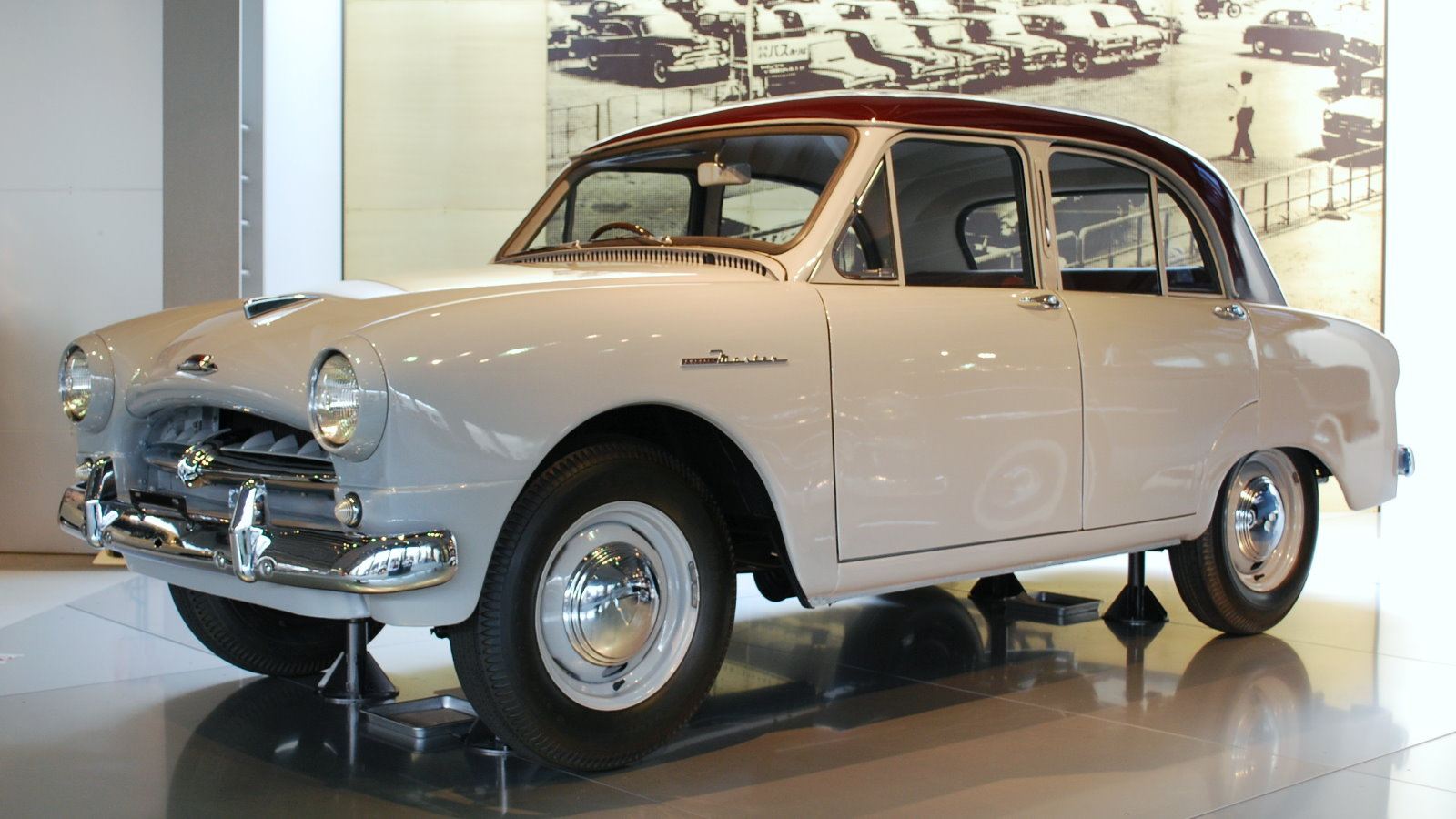

Overview
- Manufacturer: Toyota (Kanto Auto Works)
- Production: Jan 1955–Nov 1956 (Master); Nov 1955–Sep 1967 (Masterline); 1956–1959 (Master Ribbon)
- Assembly: Japan
- Designer: Tozo Yabuta

Body and chassis
- Class: Compact
- Body style: 4-door sedan; 2-door extended cab coupé utility; 2-door coupé utility; 2-door delivery
- Layout: front-engine, rear-wheel drive
- Platform: ladder frame
- Related: Toyopet Crown RS; Toyopet Toyoace SKB

Powertrain
- Engine: 1,453 cc type R OHV I4

Chronology
- Predecessor: Toyota RH
- Successor: Toyota Corona (Master); Toyota Crown Van/Pickup (Masterline)

The Toyopet Master, introduced in January 1955, is a passenger car that was an evolution of the earlier Toyota SF/RH sedan (also known as the Super) with a modernized body. As with its predecessor, the Master has a ladder frame truck chassis with leaf sprung solid axles both at the front and the rear. The more conservative Master was sold in parallel with the first Toyota Crown as a frugally equipped and robust version meant for taxi usage. The Master and Crown shared the same R-series engine, which produces 48 PS (35 kW) in the Master. It was sold at a chain of Toyota Japan dealerships called Toyota Store, next to the more upscale Crown, which was intended as a private purchase alternative to the Master.

== History ==
In 1955 Toyota wasn't sure if its independent front coil suspension and the rear-hinged back doors installed on the Crown would be too radical for the taxi market to accept or not. When sales of the Crown proved satisfying, the Master sedan was discontinued in November 1956. The Master's body was built by Toyota's Kanto Auto Works subcontractor, as with the preceding RHK Super model. Along with the perceived need for a more robust and conservative model for professional users, Toyota was also interested in providing Kanto Auto Works with assembly work to make up for Toyota moving the production of the Crown entirely in-house. Project Manager Tozo Yabuta quickly developed the Master using a large number of the RHK's parts, with the first prototype running in March 1954. One seemingly retrograde step was moving from the RH's four-speed to a three-speed transmission (although the new unit was fully synchronized), but Japanese buyers at the time associated the need for many gears with weak engines.

The Master sedan was partially replaced with the smaller Toyota Corona in 1957, at a new Toyota Japanese dealership called Toyopet Store. The RR Master's body panels were used in cut-down form as an economical and fast way to design this new ST10 Corona. Production facilities for the Master were transferred to the Crown. In 1995, Toyota revisited the approach of a commercial grade Crown sedan, designed primarily for taxi usage, and introduced the Toyota Comfort which is still in production, with prolific usage across Asia.

== Masterline (RR) ==
The Toyopet Master range also included the Masterline RR16 pickup, the Masterline RR17 van and the later Masterline RR19 double pickup (with two rows of seats). They were introduced in November 1955, originally only as a single-cab pickup and a van. These replaced the SG commercial models and were the first car-based trucks to enter production in Japan. The chassis were built at Toyota's main Aichi plant and then transported overland to Kanto Auto Works in Yokosuka, where the bodies were assembled mainly by hand. The double pickup was added in August 1956, around which time the engine was upgraded to provide 55 PS (40 kW). By 1958, power had been increased again, reaching 58 PS (43 kW). The double cab pickup was built by Central Motor Co., who kept building this bodystyle of succeeding generations until December 1970. The double-cab could seat six people with a maximum cargo load of 500 kg (1,100 lb), but was subject to the lower tax applied to commercial vehicles, making it popular with construction firms and the like.

The Masterline commercial models were carried over after the discontinuation of the Master. In 1957 the light van was lightly changed and was now fully glazed, rather than having pressed steel in the rear side windows. The first generation Masterlines were built until replaced by a new Crown-based generation in March 1959, for the Toyota Store sales channel. A total of 19,400 Master and Masterlines (excluding the Central Motors-built RR19s) were built by Kanto Auto Works until production ended in 1959.

=== Master Ribbon (RS) ===
Toyota managed to introduce yet another variant on the Master/Crown theme with the "Master Ribbon" which appeared in export catalogues in the first half of 1956. This was a series of light commercials using the body panels of the Masterline but with the more modern Crown chassis underneath, including that car's independent front suspension. A two-door pickup or chassis-cab (RS16), and a two-door Light Van (RS17) were offered, also available with left-hand-drive. The engine was the same 48 PS (35 kW) R unit seen in other Master models. Later in 1956 a two-seat pickup version also entered lists, with the RS19 chassis code.

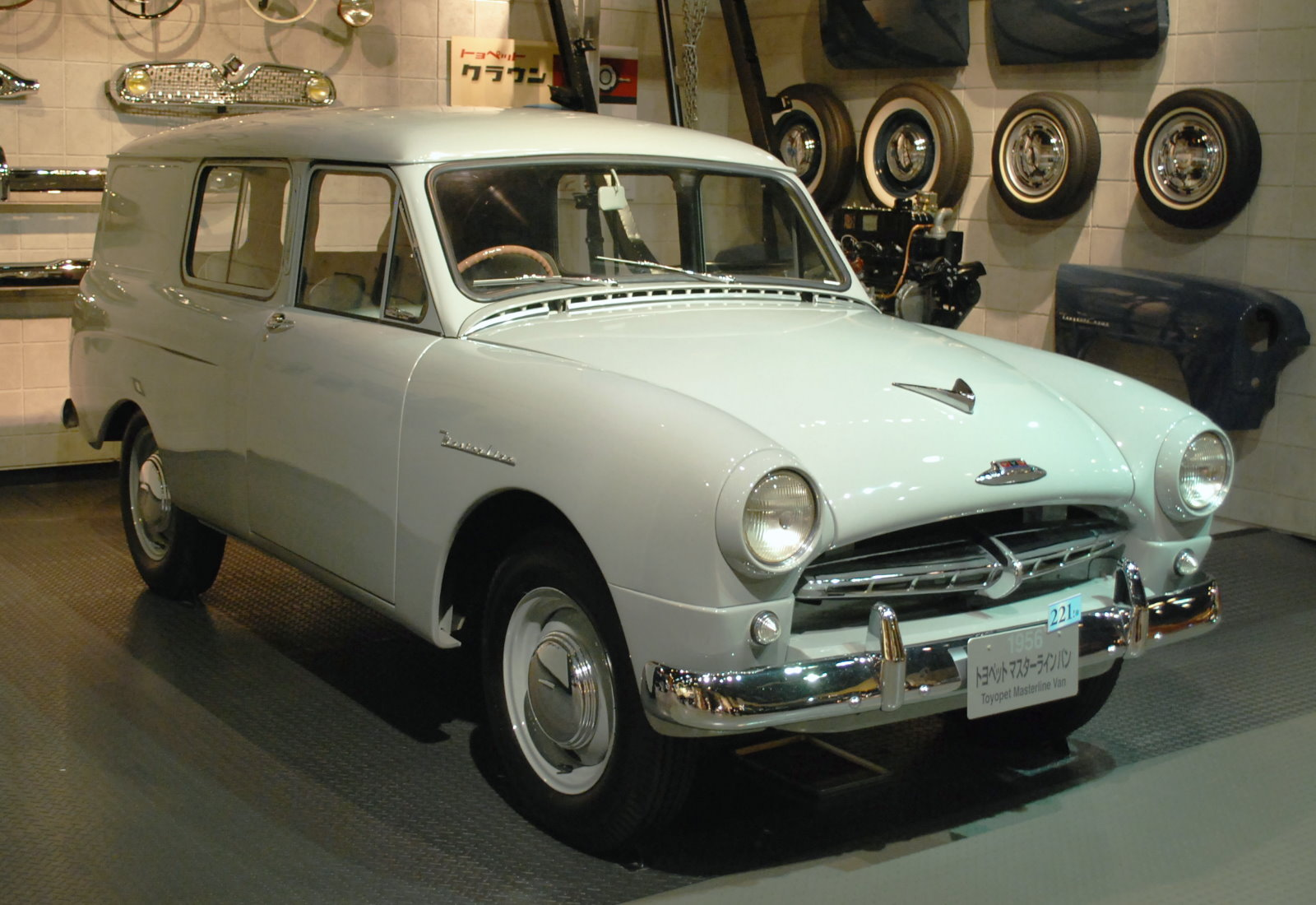
1956 Toyopet Masterline Van (RR17)

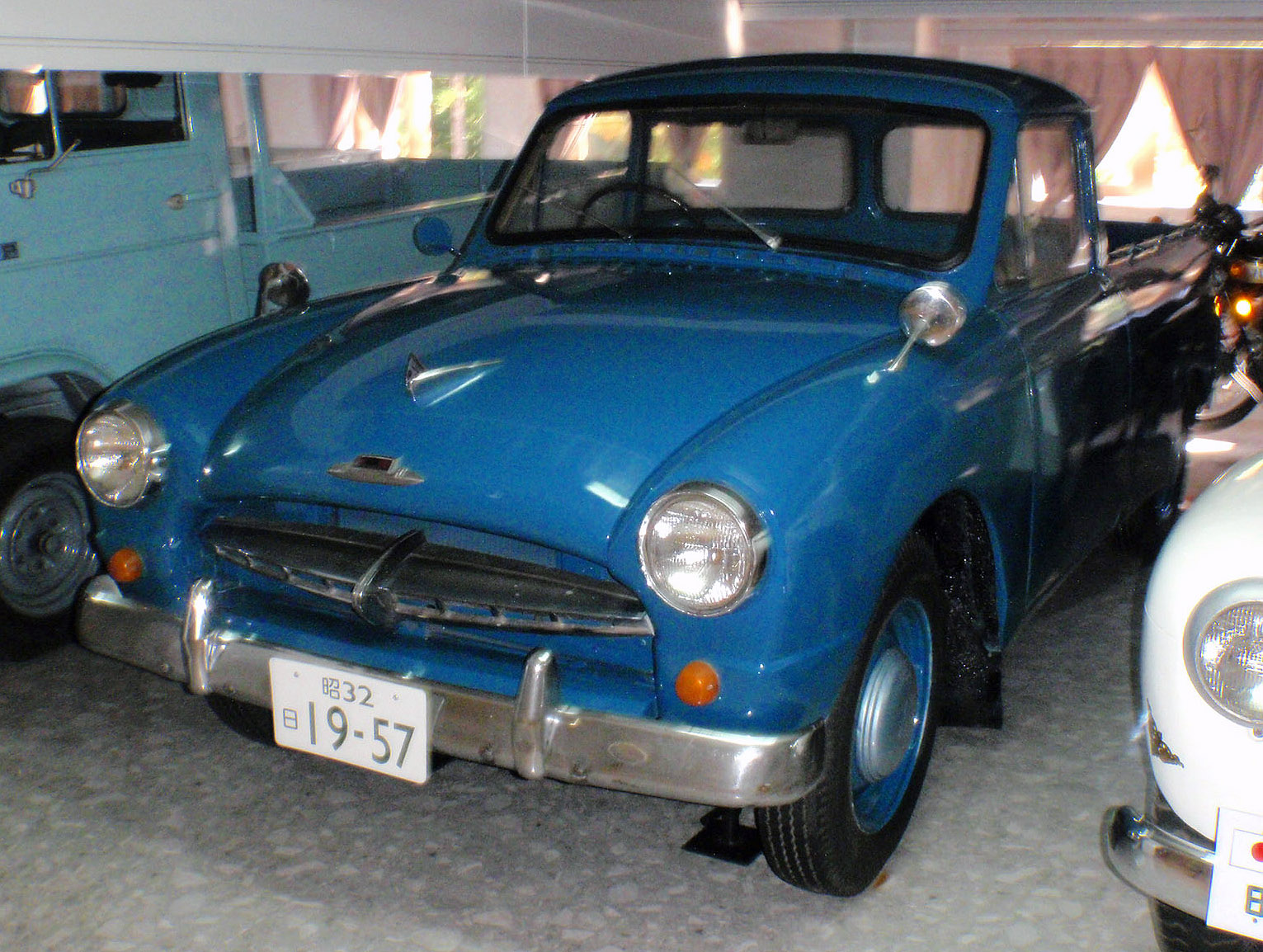
1957 Toyopet Masterline Pickup (RR16)

== Masterline (RS20/30) ==
When the Crown passenger car was facelifted, the Masterline nameplate was moved to the commercial versions of the Crown. This meant independent front suspension coupled with the Crown's bodywork; Toyota now only used solid front axles on trucks intended to carry more than 1.5 tonnes (3,300 lb). The new version was available as a single-cab pickup (RS26) or as a two-door light van (RS26V), both fitted with the 1.5-liter R engine.

In 1960 regulations were changed and passenger cars and light commercials were allowed to be longer and wider, with maximum engine size increased from 1,500 to 2,000 cc. Toyota responded accordingly with the new RS30 Crown and RS36 Masterlines, which arrived in June 1960. This was also when Kanto Auto Works relinquished production of the Masterline. The pickup was called the RS36 while the light van received the RS36V chassis code. The bodies grew and two new bodystyles were introduced: a double-cab pickup (RS36P) and a four-door van (RS36V-B). The engine was upgraded to the 1.9-liter 3R version. Another difference is that the RS36-series cars have 5-bolt, 13-inch (330 mm) wheels rather than the 6-bolt, 15-inch (380 mm) units used on earlier Masterlines.

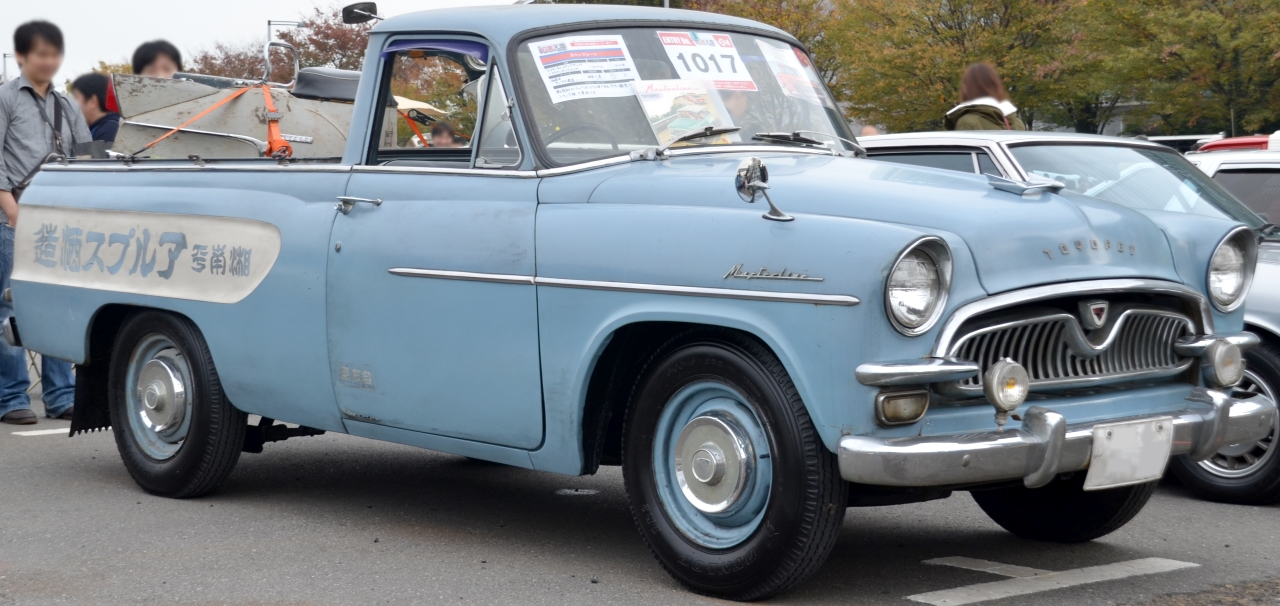
Toyopet Masterline pickup (RS26)

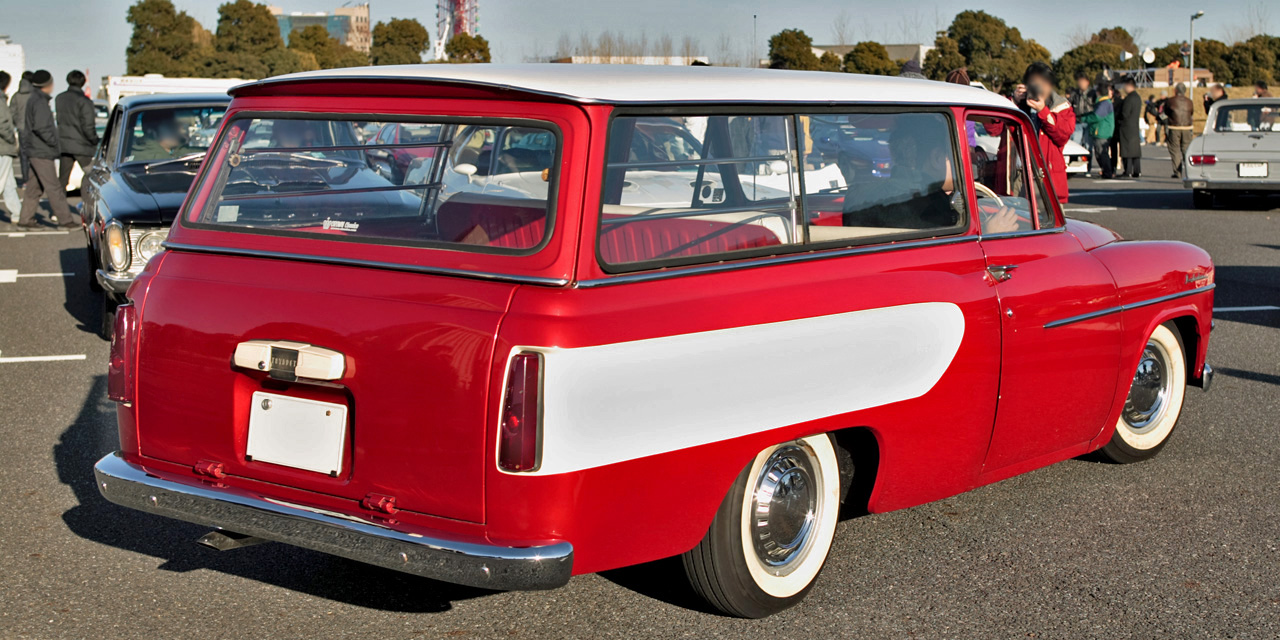
1961 Toyopet Masterline Light Van (RS36V)

== Masterline (RS40) ==
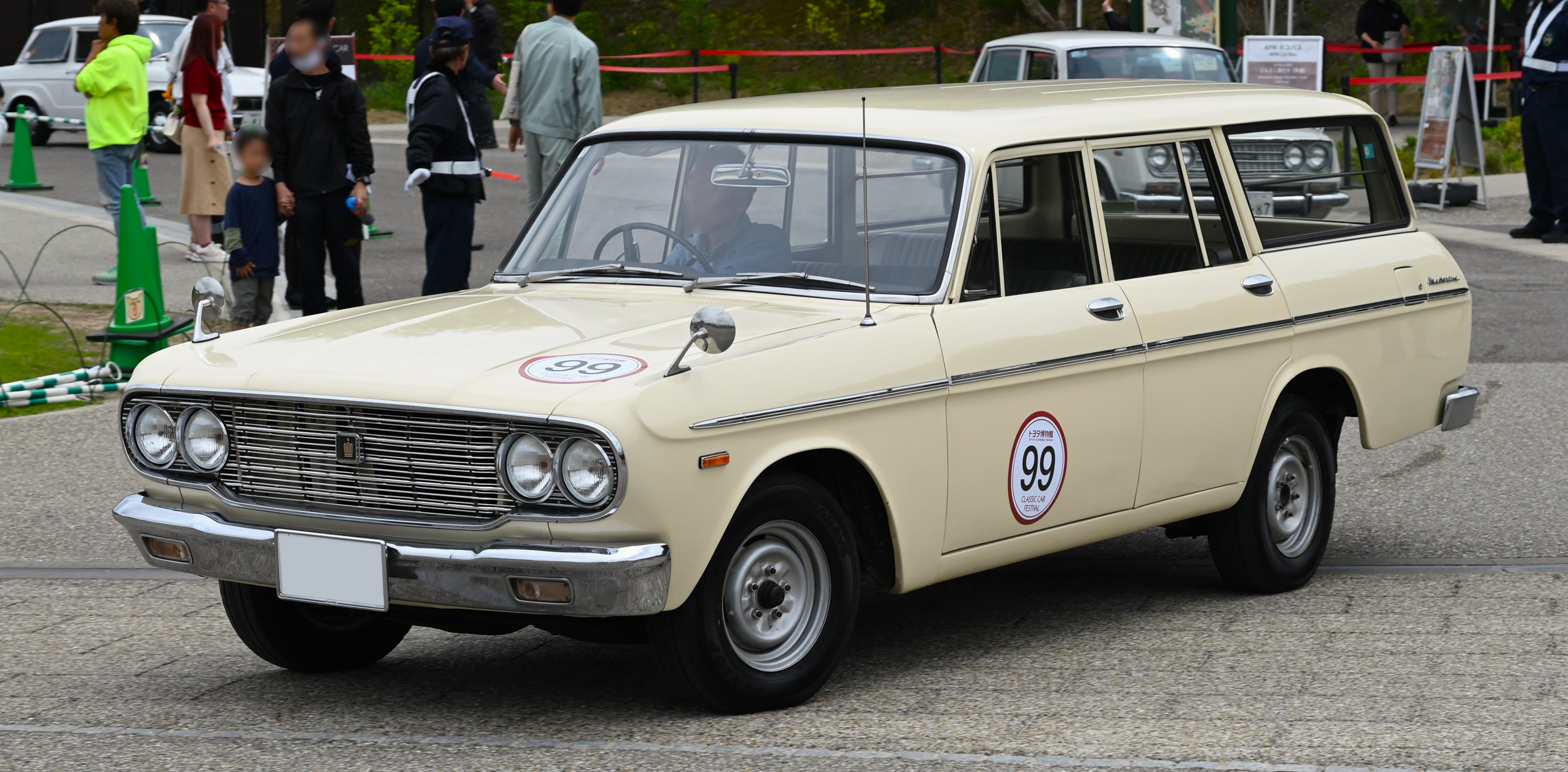
1967 Toyopet Masterline (RS46V)

The all-new RS46 Toyopet Masterline arrived in October 1962, using the same 80 PS (59 kW) 1.9-liter 3R engine as the previous RS36 models. Bodystyles included a pickup (RS46), a double-cab pickup (RS46P), and a four-door light van (RS46V). The two-door van bodystyle was discontinued. A two-liter inline-six model was added in November 1965; this received chassis codes beginning with MS47. As for the previous models, the Masterline was sold with Toyota Crown badges in export markets. The Masterline nameplate was discontinued in September 1967 as the S50 Crown was introduced; from now on the commercial models were sold as Crowns in Japan as well. Crown pickup production ended for good at the end of 1970.

== Dates and production figures ==
Produced at Kanto Auto Works from January 1955 to November 1956 (Master sedan); a total of 7,403 RR sedans were built. About 12,000 RR16 and RR17 Masterlines were also built by Kanto, while the double cab RR19 was built by Central Motor Co. It is not known how many RR19s were built, but Central Motor Co. assembled a total of 43,241 double cab Masterlines and Crowns (from four generations) until December 1970.
