= Toyota concept vehicles (2010–2019) =

Toyota Concept Vehicles produced between 2010 and 2019 include:

== T Sports (2010) ==
Toyota T Sports

Overview
- Manufacturer: Toyota
- Production: 2010

The Toyota T Sports is a concept car made by Toyota in 2010. It was shown at the Tokyo Motor Show.

== FT-86 G Sports (2010) ==
Toyota FT-86 G Sports Concept
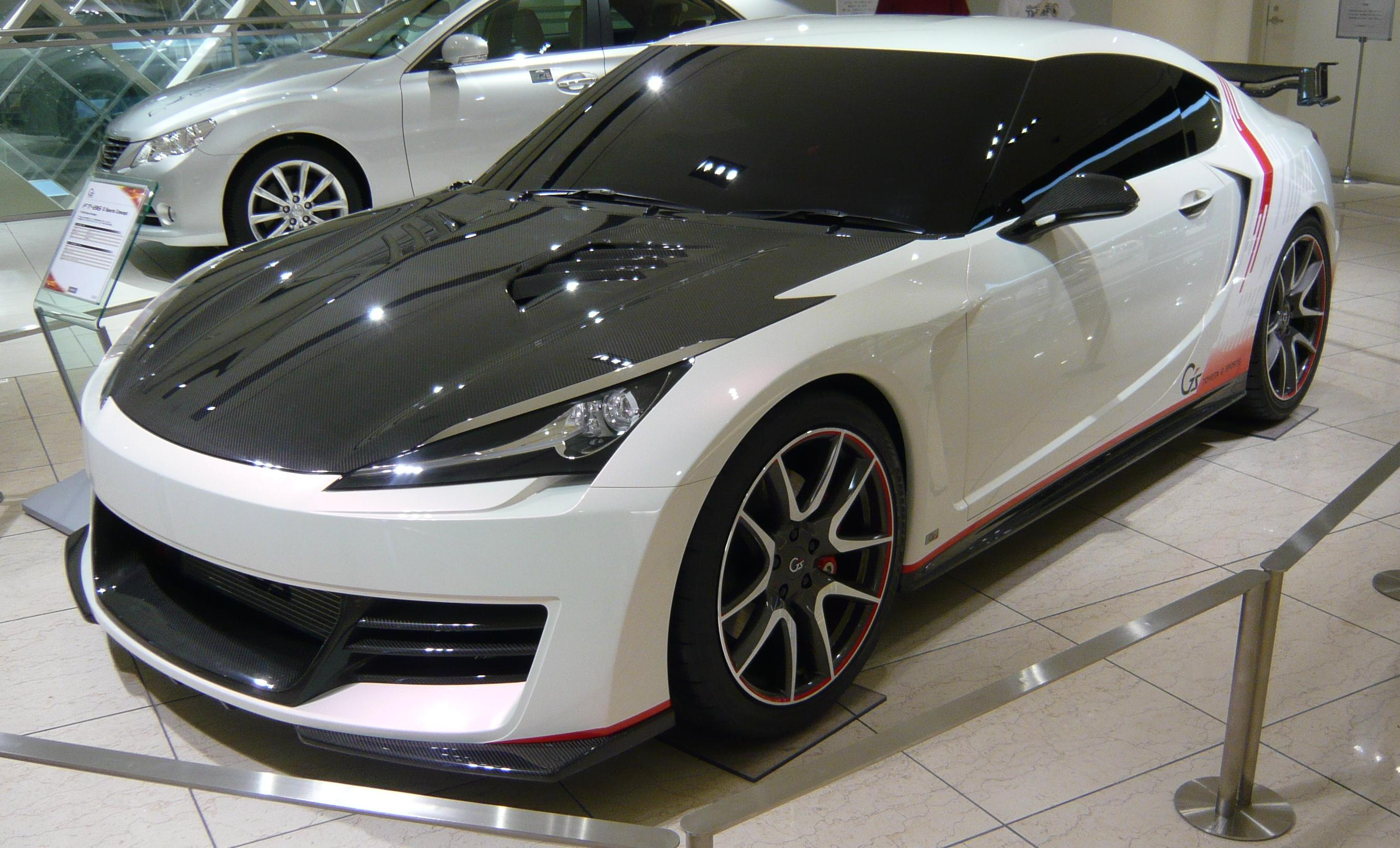

Overview
- Manufacturer: Toyota
- Production: 2010

Body and chassis
- Body style: 3-door hatchback
- Layout: FR layout

Powertrain
- Engine: 2.0 L Flat-4 Toyota-Subaru "D-4S" Boxer engine
- Transmission: 6 speed manual

Dimensions
- Length: 4,190 mm (165.0 in)
- Width: 1,780 mm (70.1 in)
- Height: 1,230 mm (48.4 in)

Chronology
- Predecessor: Toyota FT-86 Concept

The Toyota FT-86 G Sports Concept is a modification of the Toyota FT-86 Concept manufactured jointly by Toyota and Subaru and shown at the January 2010 Tokyo Auto Salon as part of the Toyota G Sports range. The FT-86 G Sports Concept differs from the original FT-86 in the use of carbon fibre panels, a vented bonnet, a large rear spoiler, new 19 inch wheels and a custom exhaust. The interior features Recaro bucket seats and a rollcage. The horizontally opposed engine is upgraded with a turbocharger. The FT-86 G Sports concept has reappeared at Toyota's showroom in Amlux, Ikebukuro. The production version of the FT-86 has been named as the Toyota 86.

== GRMN Sports Hybrid Concept (2010) ==
Toyota GRMN Sports Hybrid Concept

Overview
- Manufacturer: Toyota
- Production: 2010

Body and chassis
- Body style: 2-door coupe
- Layout: All-Wheel Drive (AWD)

Powertrain
- Engine: 3.5-litre Type 2GR-FXE V6

Dimensions
- Length: 4350 mm
- Width: 1890 mm
- Height: 1200 mm
- Curb weight: 1500 kg

Chronology
- Predecessor: Toyota MR2
- Successor: Toyota GRMN Sports Hybrid Concept II

The GRMN Sports Hybrid Concept is a concept sports car made by Toyota in 2010. It is made in partnership with Gazoo Racing.

== MOB (2010) ==
Toyota MOB

Overview
- Manufacturer: Toyota
- Production: 2010
- Designer: Jorge Marti Vidal

Body and chassis
- Class: Race car
- Body style: 2 door sport car
- Related: Toyota ME.WE

Dimensions
- Length: 3,643 mm
- Width: 1,787 mm
- Height: 1,063 mm

The Toyota MOB is an all-electric open air race car made by Toyota in 2010. It uses reusable organic materials.

== Prius Custom Plus Concept (2010) ==
Toyota Prius Custom Plus Concept

Overview
- Manufacturer: Toyota
- Production: 2010

The Prius Custom Plus Concept is a modification of the Toyota Prius and shown at the January 2010 Tokyo Auto Salon. The Custom Plus differs from the Prius by its aggressive body kit and new wheels.

== FT-CH (2010) ==
Toyota FT-CH Concept
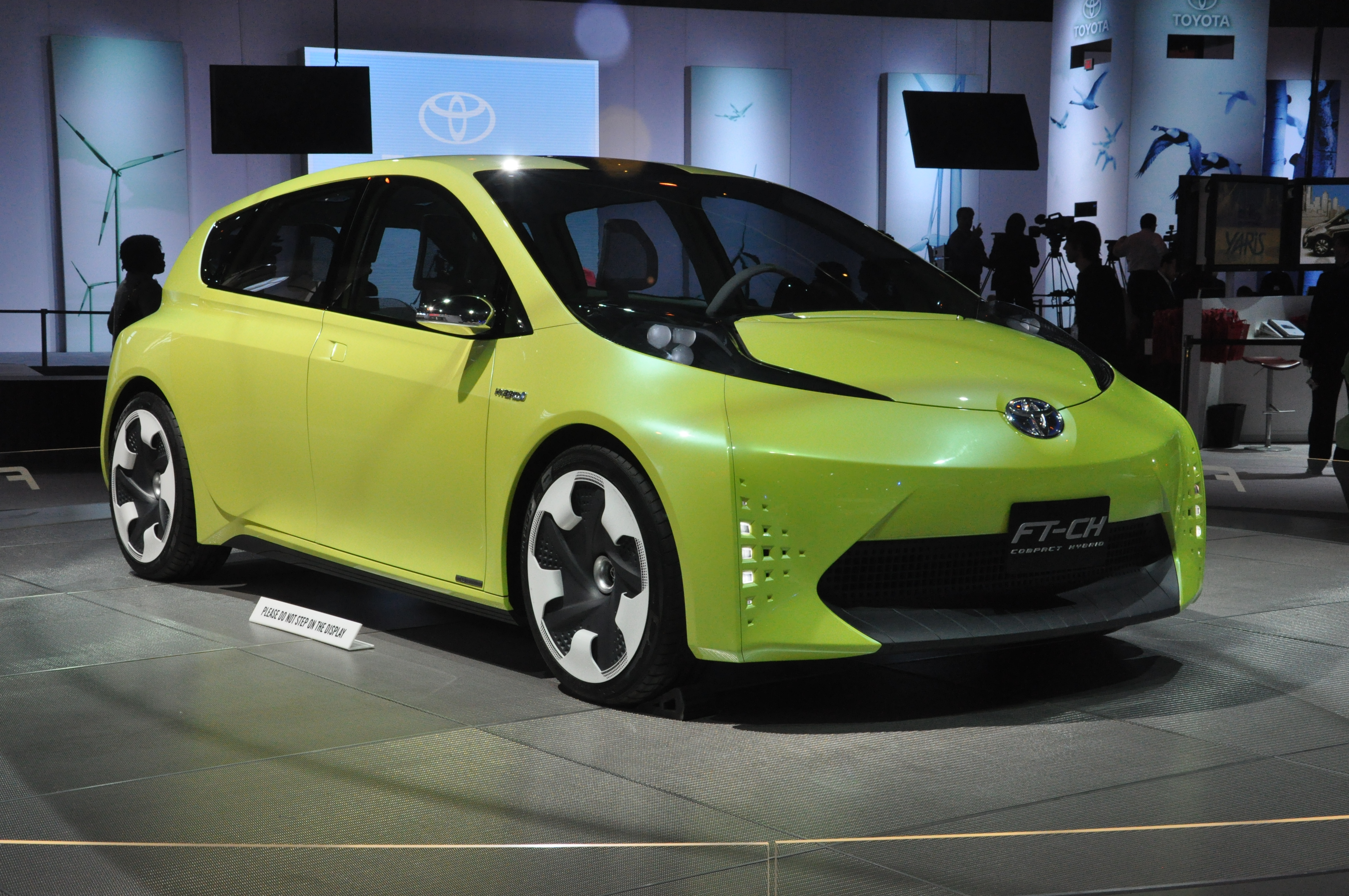

Overview
- Manufacturer: Toyota
- Production: 2010

Body and chassis
- Body style: 5-door hatchback

Dimensions
- Length: 3,895 mm (153.3 in)
- Width: 1,695 mm (66.7 in)
- Height: 1,400 mm (55.1 in)

The Toyota FT-CH (Future Toyota Compact Hybrid) is a concept vehicle built by Toyota and first shown at the January 2010 North American International Auto Show. Compared to the Toyota Prius, the FT-CH is 560 mm (22 in) shorter in overall length and less than 25 mm (1 in) narrower in overall width. It is lighter in weight and more fuel efficient than the Prius. This concept is targeting a lower price range than the Prius line-up, thus "appealing to a younger, less-affluent buyer demographic."

The FT-CH was designed at Toyota European Design and Development. The NiMH batteries are made by Panasonic EV Energy Co – a joint venture between Toyota and Panasonic.

== Sports EV (2010) ==
Toyota Sports EV

Overview
- Manufacturer: Toyota
- Production: 2010

Body and chassis
- Body style: 2-door, 2-seat sports car
- Layout: FR layout

Dimensions
- Length: 3,580 mm (140.9 in)
- Width: 1,465 mm (57.7 in)
- Height: 1,175 mm (46.3 in)
- Curb weight: 700 kg (1,543.2 lb)

The Toyota Sports EV (Sports Electric Vehicle) was a concept vehicle built by the Toyota Technical College of Tokyo and first shown at the January 2010 Tokyo Auto Salon. It was based on a Toyota Sports 800 with the original 2 cylinder petrol engine being replaced by a single 28 kW electric motor.

On 27 November 2010, the Sports EV participated in the classic car parade at the Toyota Automobile Museum Classic Car Festival in Tokyo.

== Sports EV Twin (2010) ==
Toyota Sports EV twin
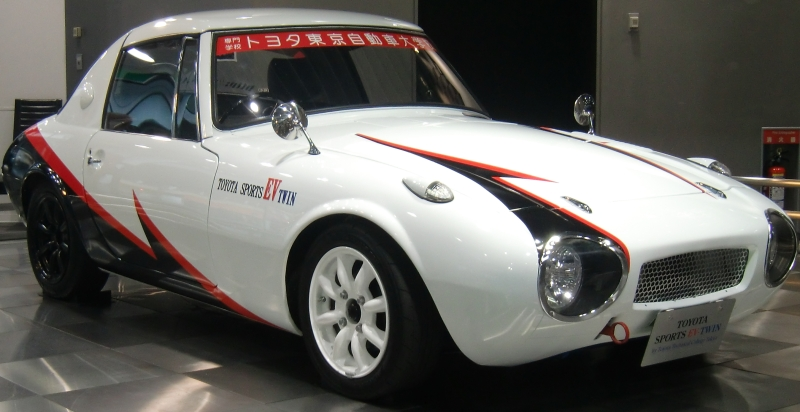

Overview
- Manufacturer: Toyota
- Production: 2010

Body and chassis
- Body style: 2-door, 2-seat sports car
- Layout: FR layout

Powertrain
- Transmission: manual

Dimensions
- Length: 3,580 mm (140.9 in)
- Width: 1,465 mm (57.7 in)
- Height: 1,175 mm (46.3 in)
- Curb weight: 700 kg (1,543.2 lb)

The Toyota Sports EV Twin (Sports Electric Vehicle) was a concept vehicle built by the Toyota Technical College of Tokyo as an update to the Sports EV and first shown at the January 2011 Tokyo Auto Salon. The single electric motor of the Sports EV was replaced with twin copies of the same 28 kW electric motor wired in series. Each electric motor projects sideways from the central shaft in a similar manner to the sports 800's original flat twin petrol engine.

== GRMN Sports Hybrid Concept II (2011) ==
Toyota GRMN Sports Hybrid Concept II
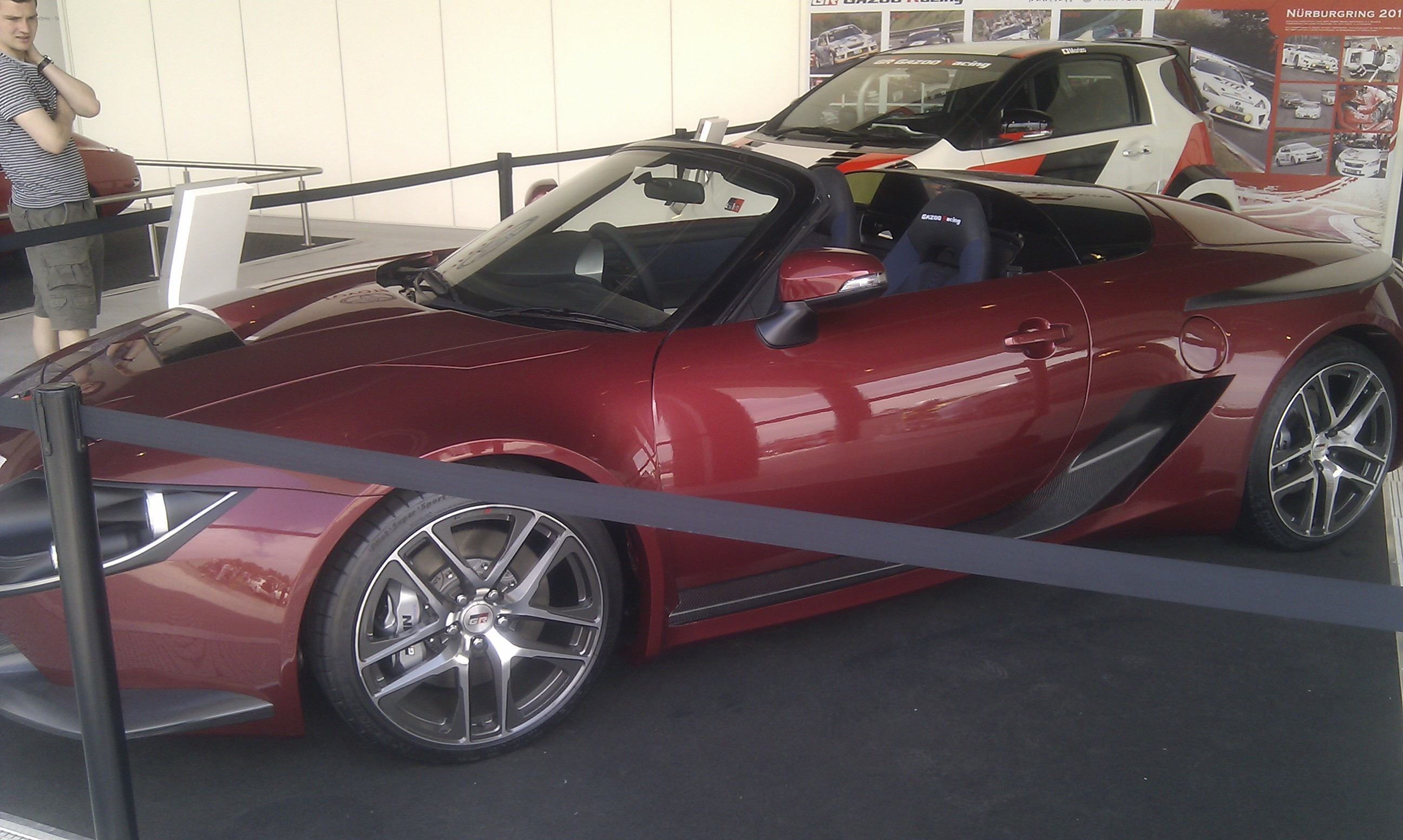

Overview
- Production: 2011

A convertible version of the first sports hybrid concept. It came out in 2011.

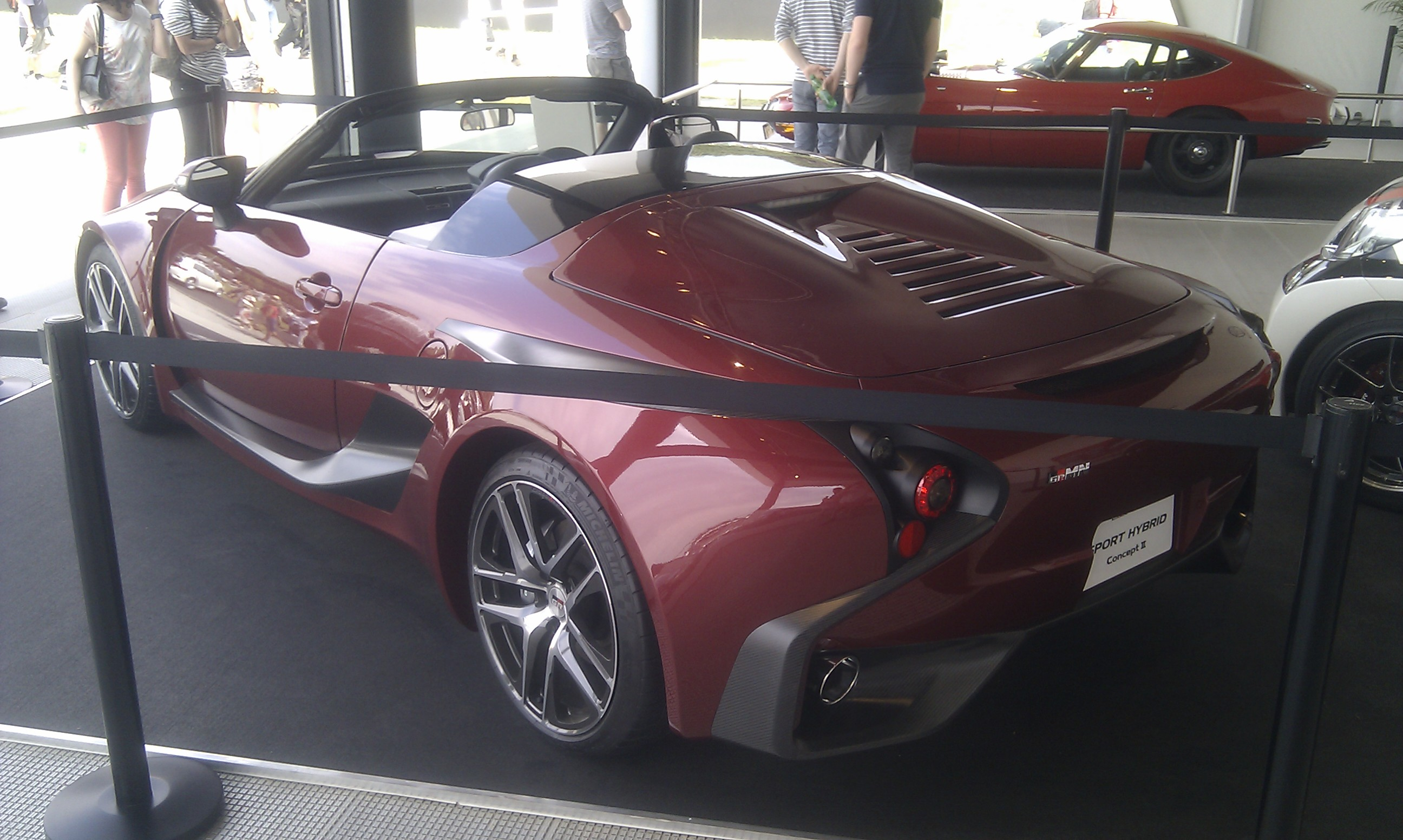
Toyota GRMN Sports Hybrid Concept II rear view

== Insect (2011) ==
The Toyota Insect is a 1-seater, 61 km/h (38 mph) top speed concept that came out in 2011, at the Japan CEATEC (Combined Exhibition of Advanced Technologies) festival. Insect stands for Information Network Social Electricity City Transporter. The Toyota i-Road, which came out in 2013, is based on the Insect. The small doors open and close like a bugs wing flapping, giving it the nickname "bug car". Toyota wanted the Insect to represent how an insect flies freely through cities. A Virtual Agent in the Toyota Smart Center recognizes the driver's voice, and automatically sets various features in the car, like the fog lights, the radio, or even setting the destination. The Insect also can be linked to the driver's home with the Toyota Smart Center, providing remote control to lights, HVAC, and even locks.

== Prius c Concept (2011) ==
Toyota Prius C Concept
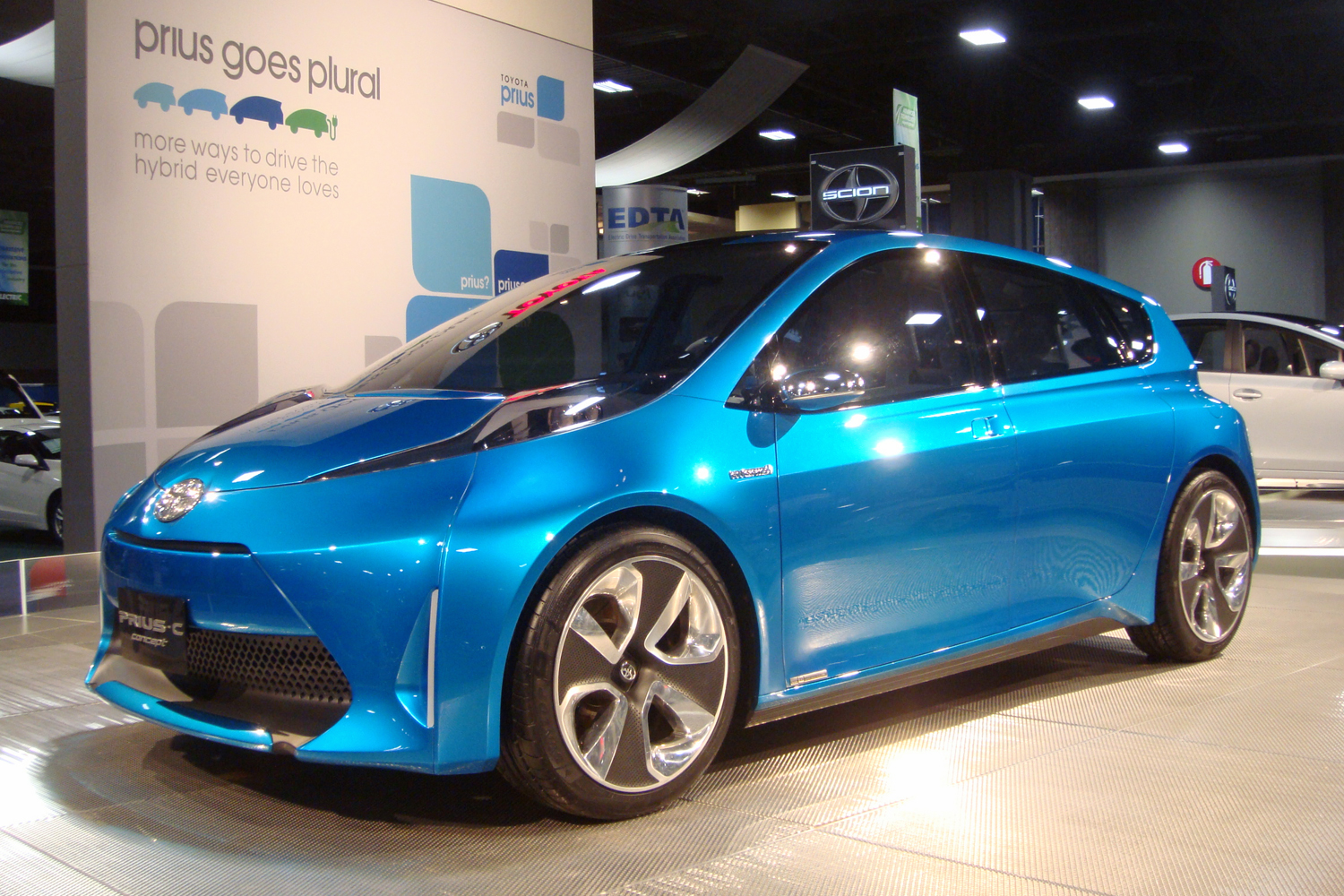

Overview
- Manufacturer: Toyota
- Production: 2011

The Toyota Prius c Concept is a small hybrid petrol-electric car which is the inspiration for the small Toyota hybrid that arrived to market in early 2012. It was first shown at the January 2011 North American International Auto Show. The 'c' in 'Prius c' stands for "city"-centric vehicle as it is much smaller than the normal Prius and is aimed at younger buyers without families who don't need lots of space."

Named the Toyota Aqua, the car was released in Japan in December 2011. Sales of the Prius c in several Asian markets began in January 2012. The Prius c was released in the U.S. and Canada in March 2012. Sales in Australia and New Zealand began in April 2012.

== Yaris HSD Concept (2011) ==
Toyota Yaris HSD Concept
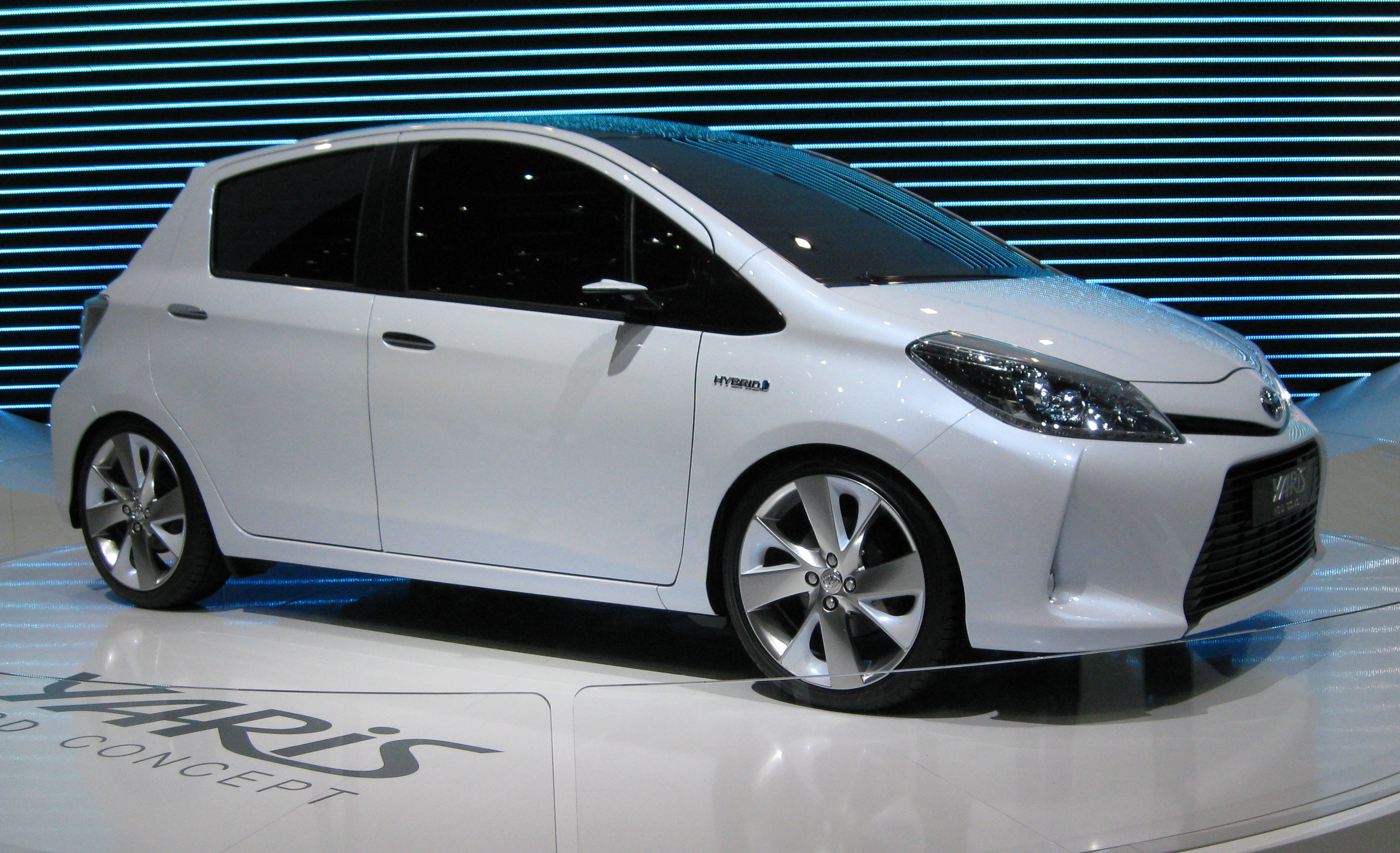

Overview
- Manufacturer: Toyota
- Production: 2011

Body and chassis
- Body style: 5-door hatchback

The Toyota Yaris HSD Concept was introduced at the March 2011 Geneva Motor Show. The concept car presented in Geneva had a solar panel located in the roof to contribute to powering the car's air-conditioning.

The production version of the 2012 Toyota Yaris Hybrid was presented at the March 2012 Geneva Motor Show. Sales of the Yaris Hybrid began in Europe in June 2012, The Yaris Hybrid shares the same powertrain as the Toyota Prius c sold in North America (Toyota Aqua in Japan).

== FT-86 II (2011) ==
Toyota FT-86 II Concept
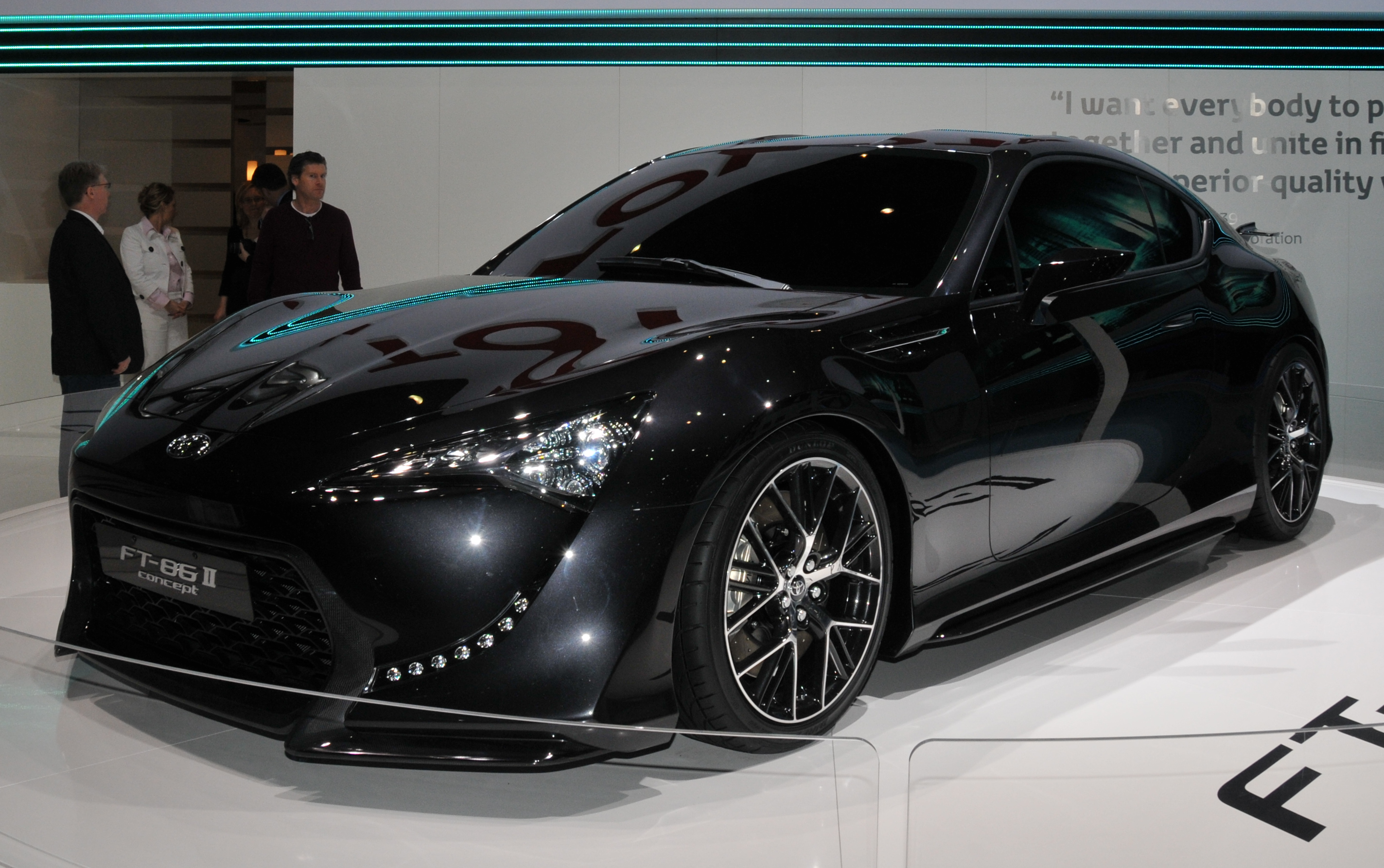
- Toyota FT-86 II Concept at the 2011 Frankfurt Motor Show

Overview
- Manufacturer: Toyota & Subaru
- Production: 2011
- Designer: Jaromir Cech (interior)

Body and chassis
- Body style: 3-door hatchback
- Layout: FR layout

Powertrain
- Engine: 2.0 L Flat-4 Toyota-Subaru "D-4S"
- Transmission: 6 speed manual

Dimensions
- Length: 4,235 mm (166.7 in)
- Width: 1,795 mm (70.7 in)
- Height: 1,270 mm (50.0 in)

Chronology
- Predecessor: Toyota FT-86 Concept
- Successor: Toyota 86; Scion FR-S Concept

On 1 March 2011, Toyota Europe presented Toyota FT-86 II Concept at the preview of the 2011 Geneva Motor Show as the successor to the Toyota FT-86 Concept. 'FT' stands for 'Future Toyota'. The vehicle was designed by the Toyota European Design and Development centre (ED^{2}) with increased dimensions compared to its predecessor. It includes redesigned front bumper and headlights, rear bumper and tail lights, an added rear spoiler and side vents.

The production model will be known as the Toyota GT 86 (Toyota 86 in Japan) and was shown at the October 2011 Tokyo Motor Show. European sales are expected in 2012. Australian sales are expected in mid 2012 at A$30,000

== Prius+ (2011) ==
Toyota Prius+

Overview
- Manufacturer: Toyota
- Production: 2011

Body and chassis
- Body style: 5-door hatchback

The Toyota Prius+ was introduced at the March 2011 Geneva Motor Show. The Prius+ is the first European hybrid seating seven passengers. It is very similar to the Prius V, with the main difference being the Prius v has two rows to seat 5 people and the Prius+ has 3 rows to seat seven people.

The Prius v went on sale in the United States in October 2011, and the Prius+ was released in Europe in June 2012. The 7-seater Prius v was launched in Australia in May 2012.

== iQ EV Prototype (2011) ==
Toyota iQ EV Prototype
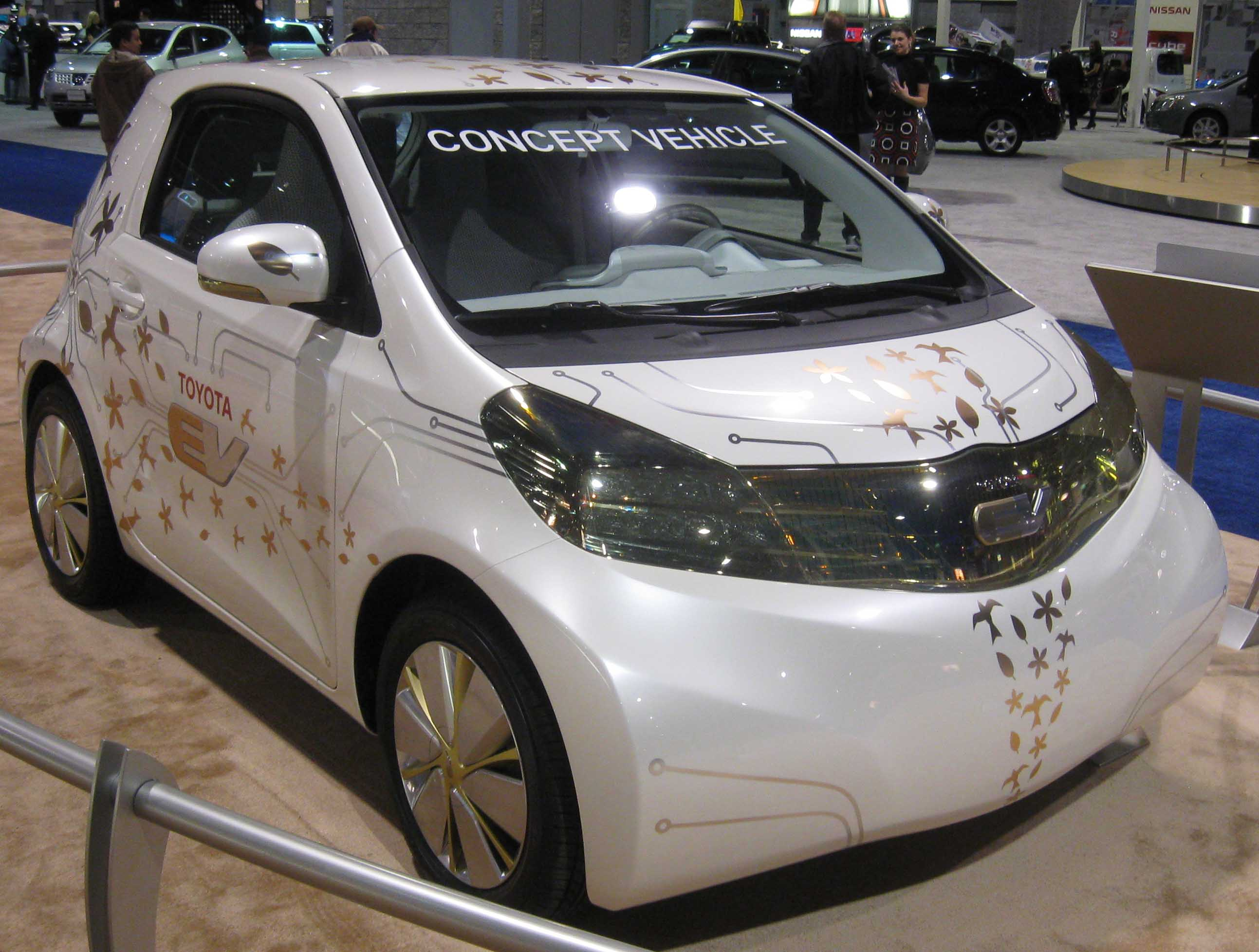

Overview
- Manufacturer: Toyota
- Production: 2011

Body and chassis
- Platform: iQ

Chronology
- Predecessor: FT-EV II

The Toyota iQ EV Prototype is the successor to the FT-EV II as an electric vehicle based on the iQ chassis. It was shown at the March 2011 Geneva Motor Show.

In September 2012 Toyota announced that due to customers' concerns about range and charging time, the production of the Scion iQ EV (Toyota eQ in Japan) will be limited to about 100 units for special fleet use in Japan and the U.S. only, down from 600 originally planned. The iQ EV/eQ is scheduled to be released in both countries in December 2012.

== Scion FR-S Concept (2011) ==
Scion FR-S Concept
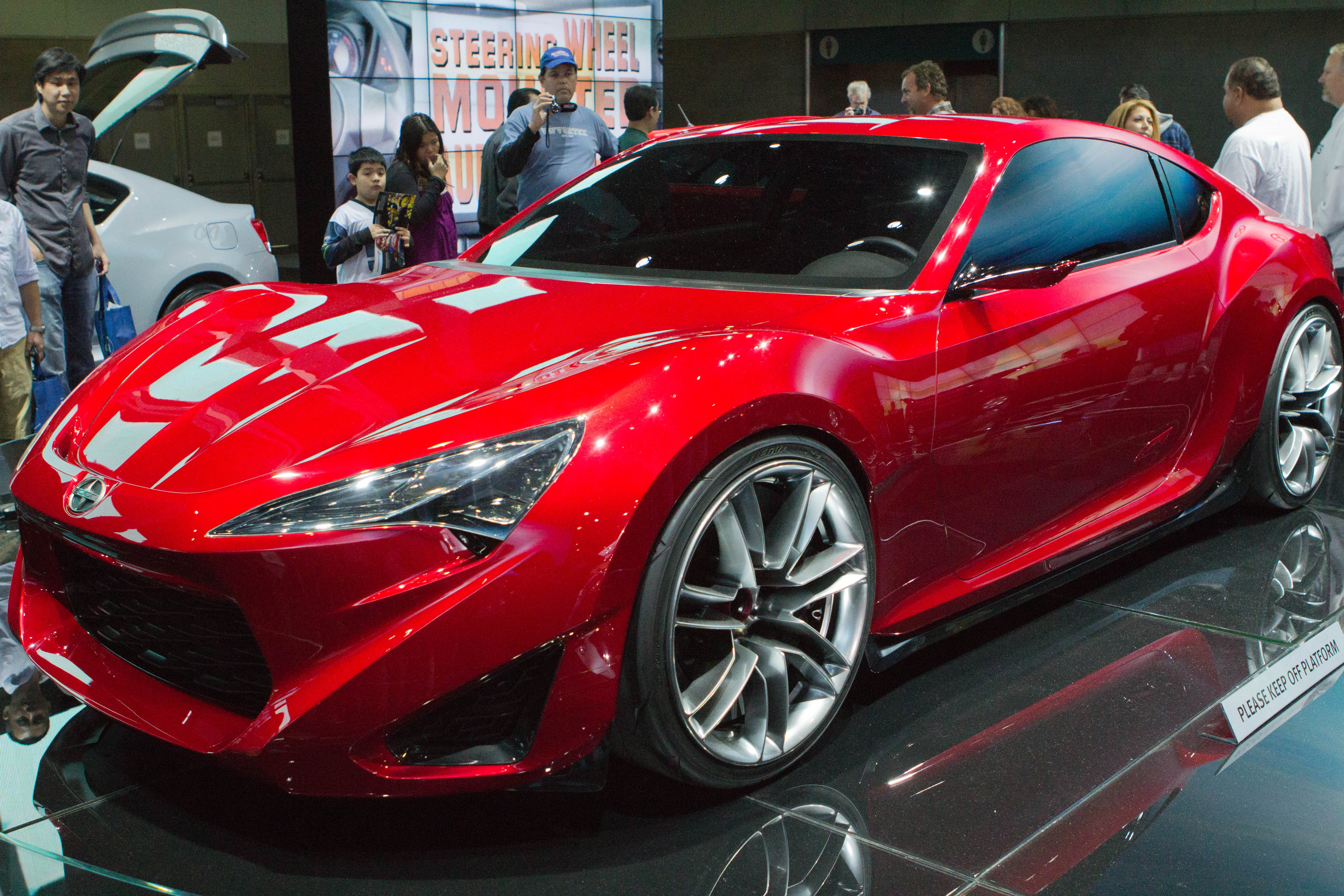

Overview
- Manufacturer: Toyota and Subaru
- Also called: Subaru FR-S Concept
- Production: 2011

Body and chassis
- Class: Sport
- Body style: 2+2 fast back
- Platform: FR

Powertrain
- Engine: 2.0 L Flat-4 Toyota-Subaru "D-4S"
- Transmission: 6 speed manual

Dimensions
- Length: 4,272.3 mm (168.2 in)
- Width: 1,816.1 mm (71.5 in)
- Height: 1,204.0 mm (47.4 in)

Chronology
- Predecessor: FT-86 II
- Successor: Scion FR-S

The Scion FR-S Sports Coupe Concept, where FR-S means Front-engine, Rear-wheel drive, Sport, was unveiled at the 2011 New York International Auto Show. According to Yahoo! Autos, sales are expected to start in the third quarter of 2012 as the Scion FR-S.

== FT-EV III (2011) ==
Toyota FT-EV III
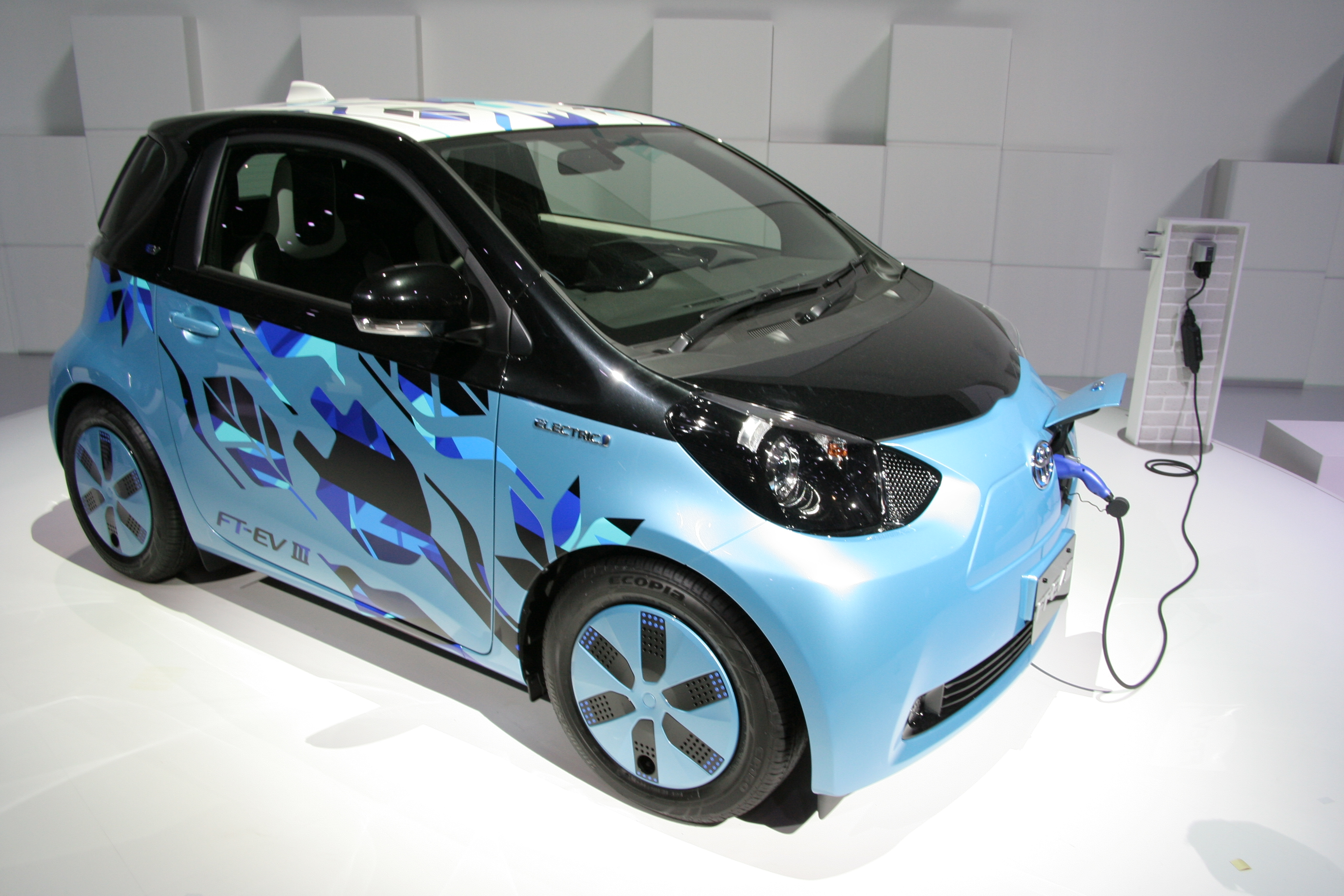

Overview
- Manufacturer: Toyota
- Production: 2011

Powertrain
- Range: 105 km (65 mi) (JC-08 test )

Chronology
- Predecessor: FT-EV II
- Successor: Scion iQ EV

The Toyota FT-EV III was unveiled at the 2011 Tokyo Motor Show. The FT-EV III was the latest concept version of the scheduled Scion iQ EV electric car. Toyota produced three generations of FT-EV concept cars, and the iQ EV is the production version of those concepts, incorporating the technological and design strengths of all three models. The exterior of the production version is based on the FT-EV III concept. Sales of the Scion iQ (U.S.)/Toyota eQ (Japan) will be limited to about 100 units for special fleet use in Japan and the U.S. only, and are scheduled for December 2012.

== Fun-vii / diji / iiMo (2011) ==
Toyota Fun-vii / diji / iiMo
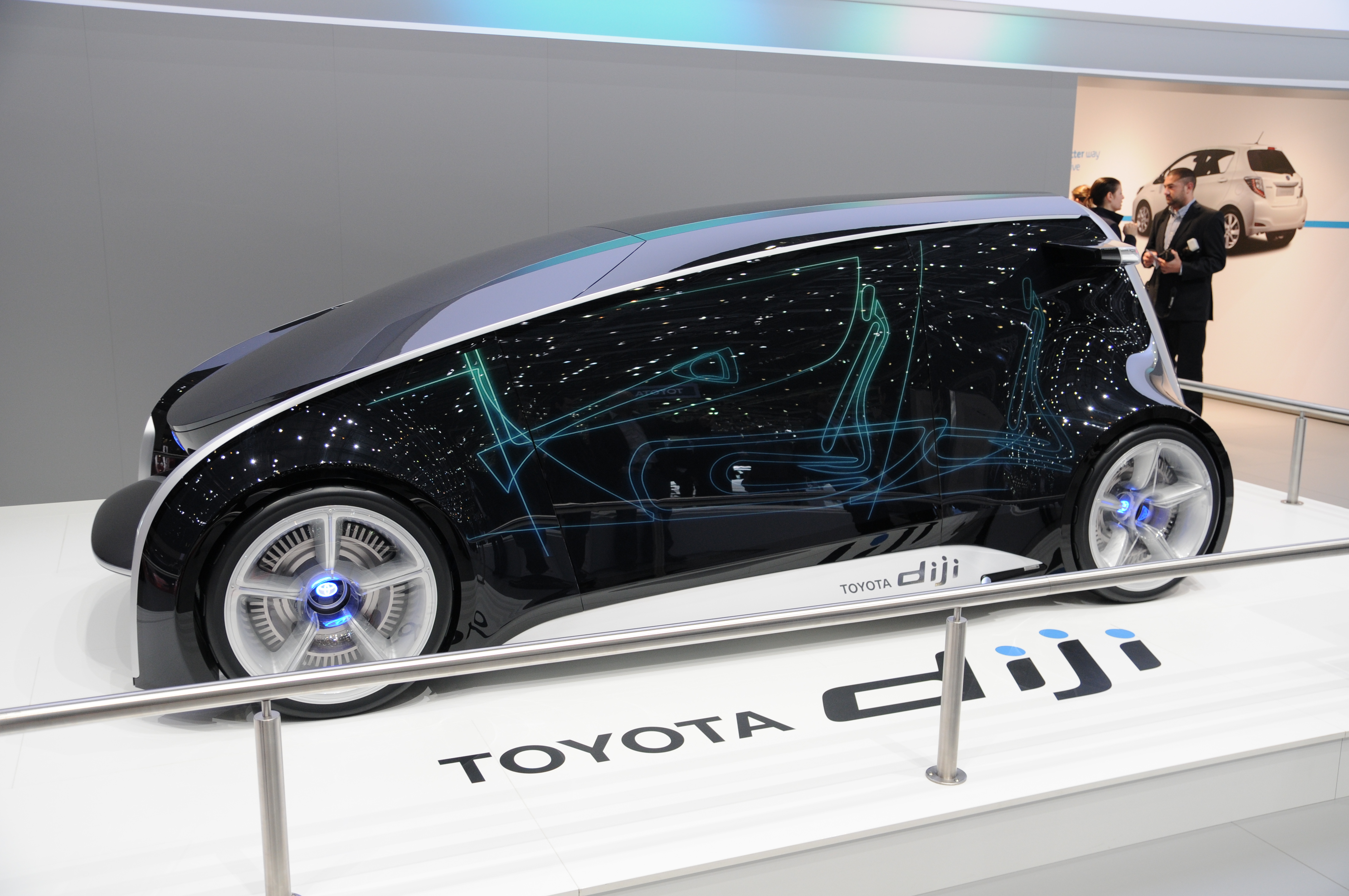
- diji at Geneva Motor Show

Overview
- Manufacturer: Toyota
- Production: 2011

Body and chassis
- Class: 3-Seat Concept

Powertrain
- Electric motor: 48V electric motor with Wireless Charging

Dimensions
- Wheelbase: 2,750 mm (108.3 in)
- Length: 4,020 mm (158.3 in)
- Width: 1,745 mm (68.7 in)
- Height: 1,415 mm (55.7 in)

The Toyota Fun-vii (vehicle, interactive, Internet) was a 3-seat concept car unveiled at the October 2011 Tokyo Motor Show. It was also shown at the January 2012 North American International Auto Show, as the Toyota diji at the March 2012 Geneva Motor Show and as the iiMo at the September/October 2012 Paris Motor Show and the October 2012 São Paulo International Transport Industry Show. It was shown as the Fun-vii at the March 2013 Bangkok International Motor Show.

The interior colours can be altered to suit the driver's mood and the entire exterior of the car can be used as a display. Navigation help is provided by a 3D avatar that is projected from the dashboard. The car can communicate by electronic network with other cars and the road that are similarly equipped. Most features can be controlled by smartphone: Toyota president Akio Toyoda called it a "smartphone on four wheels".

Initially the drive train was not known but it was revealed to be a pure electric vehicle with wireless recharging at the São Paulo show. Specifications were not given. The car is able to navigate by itself in "auto-pilot" lanes.

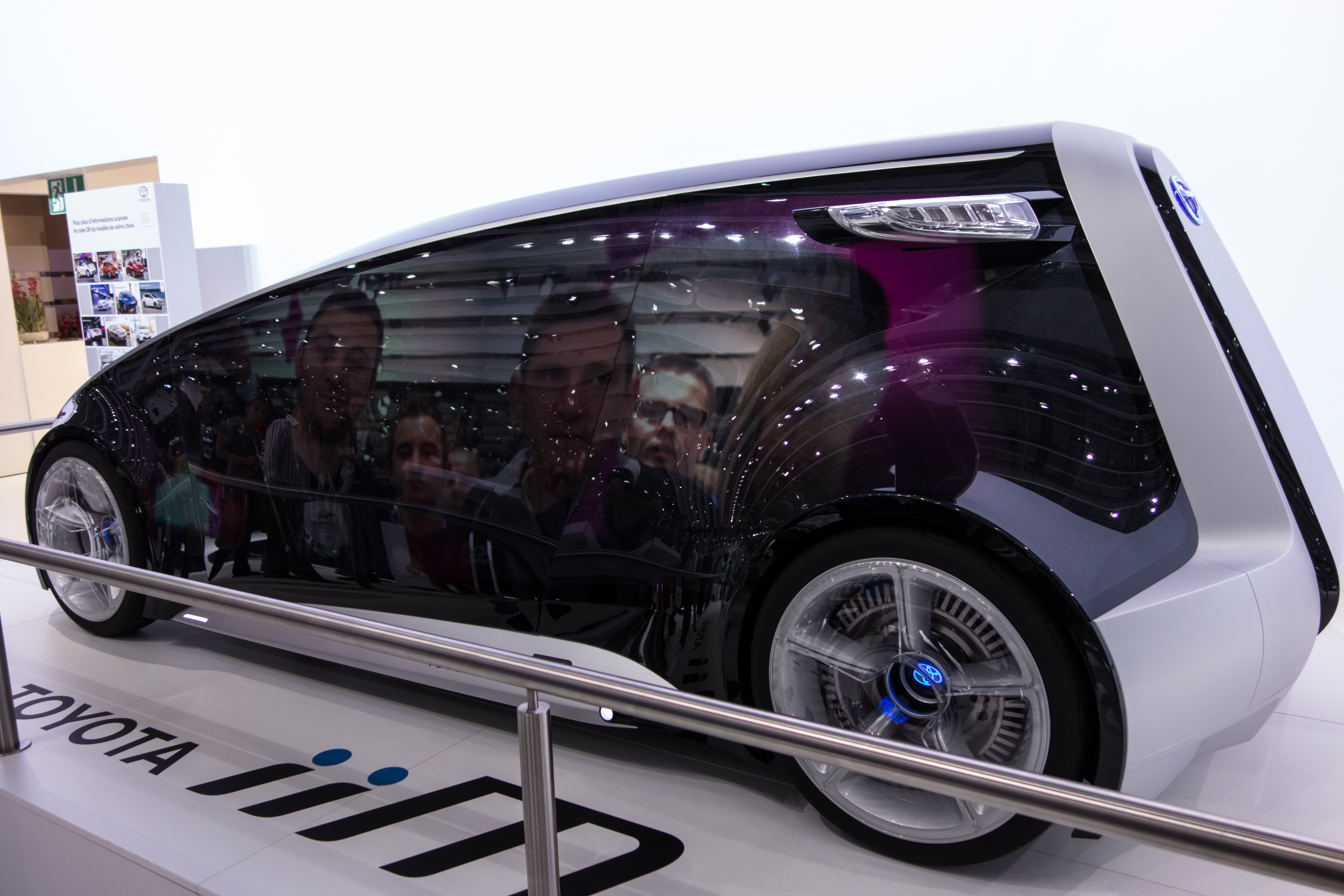
iiMo at Paris Motor Show

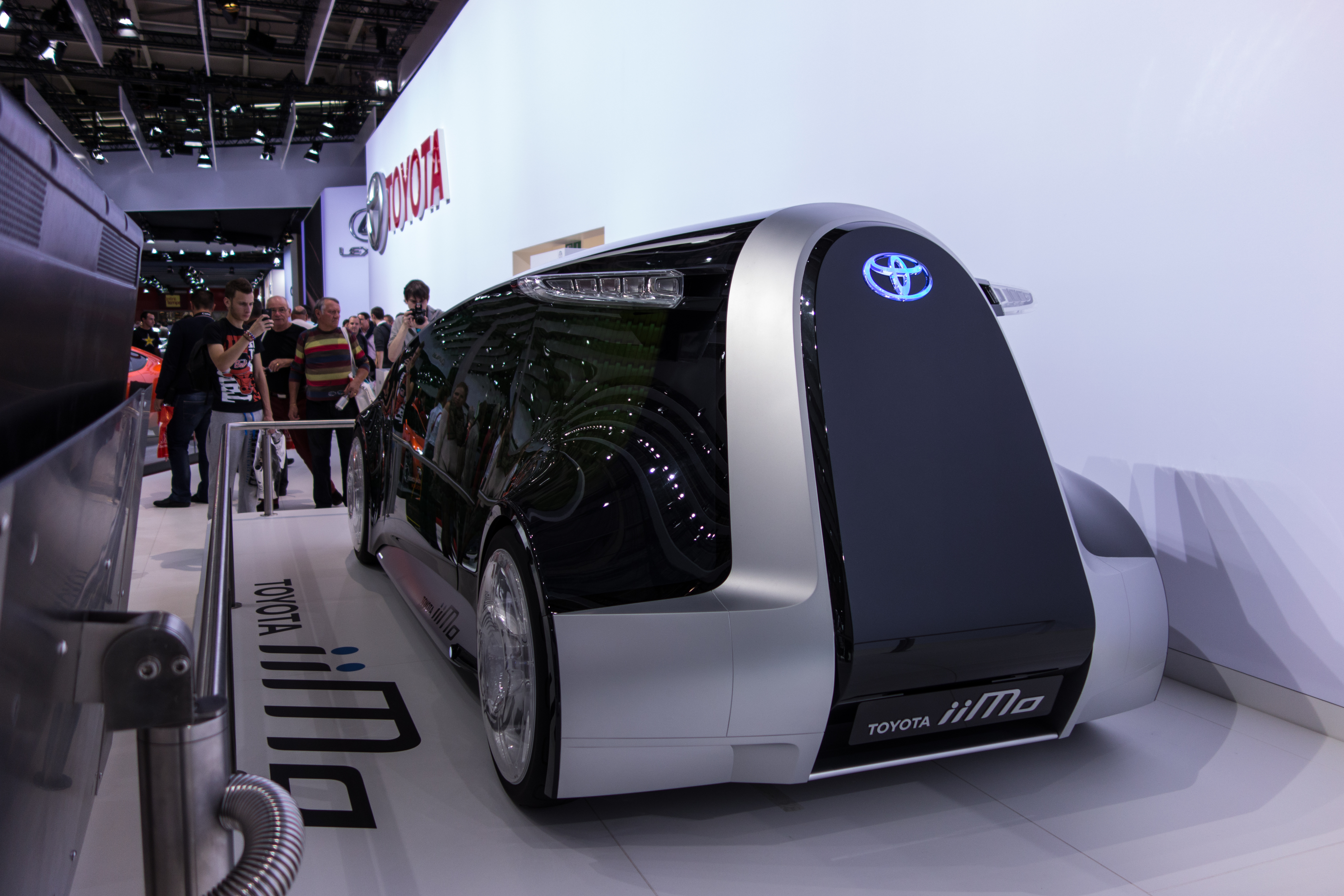
iiMo at Paris Motor Show

== Yun Dong Shuang Qing (2012) ==
Toyota Yun Dong Shuang Qing

Overview
- Manufacturer: Toyota
- Production: 2012
- Assembly: China

Chronology
- Predecessor: Toyota Camry, Toyota Dear Qin

The YunDong ShuangQing (Yun Dong Shuang Qing) is a China only concept hybrid. It was introduced at the 2012 Beijing Auto Show. Akio Toyoda says, "We would like to put smiles on the faces of our Chinese customers with hybrid technology. I want the people of China to be able to experience the beauty of hybrid technology through a hybrid car born in China."

== TES-ERA EV (2012) ==
Toyota TES ERA EV
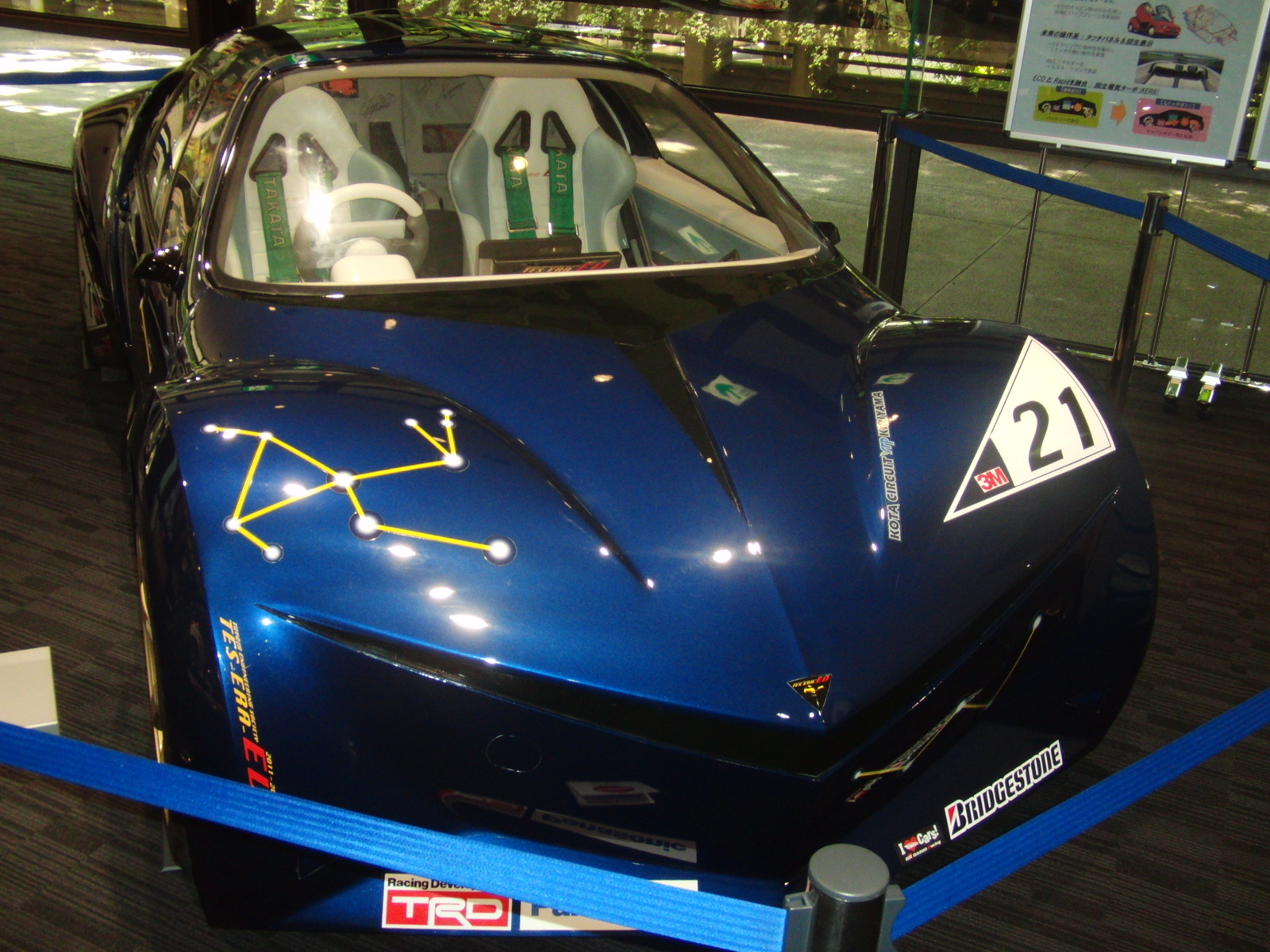

Overview
- Manufacturer: Toyota
- Production: 2012

Body and chassis
- Platform: RWD

Powertrain
- Engine: 123 kW electric, 4JM

Dimensions
- Wheelbase: 2650 mm
- Length: 3914 mm
- Width: 1842 mm
- Height: 1233 mm
- Curb weight: 1150 kg

The Toyota TES-ERA EV is a concept car made by Toyota in 2012. It was shown at the Tokyo Auto Salon. The TES-ERA EV has a top speed of 200 km/h (124 mph).

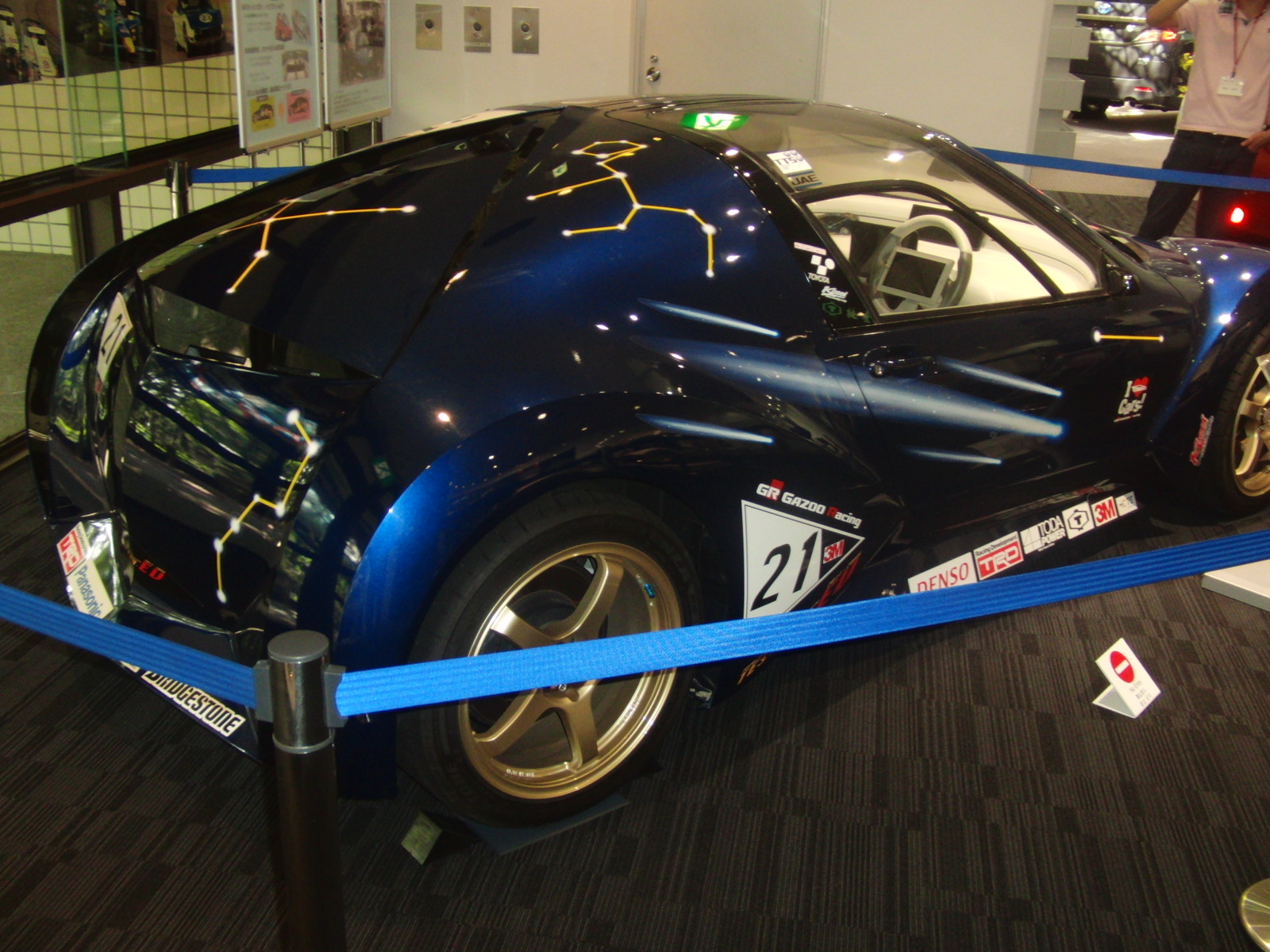
Toyota TES-ERA EV

== NS4 (2012) ==
Toyota NS4
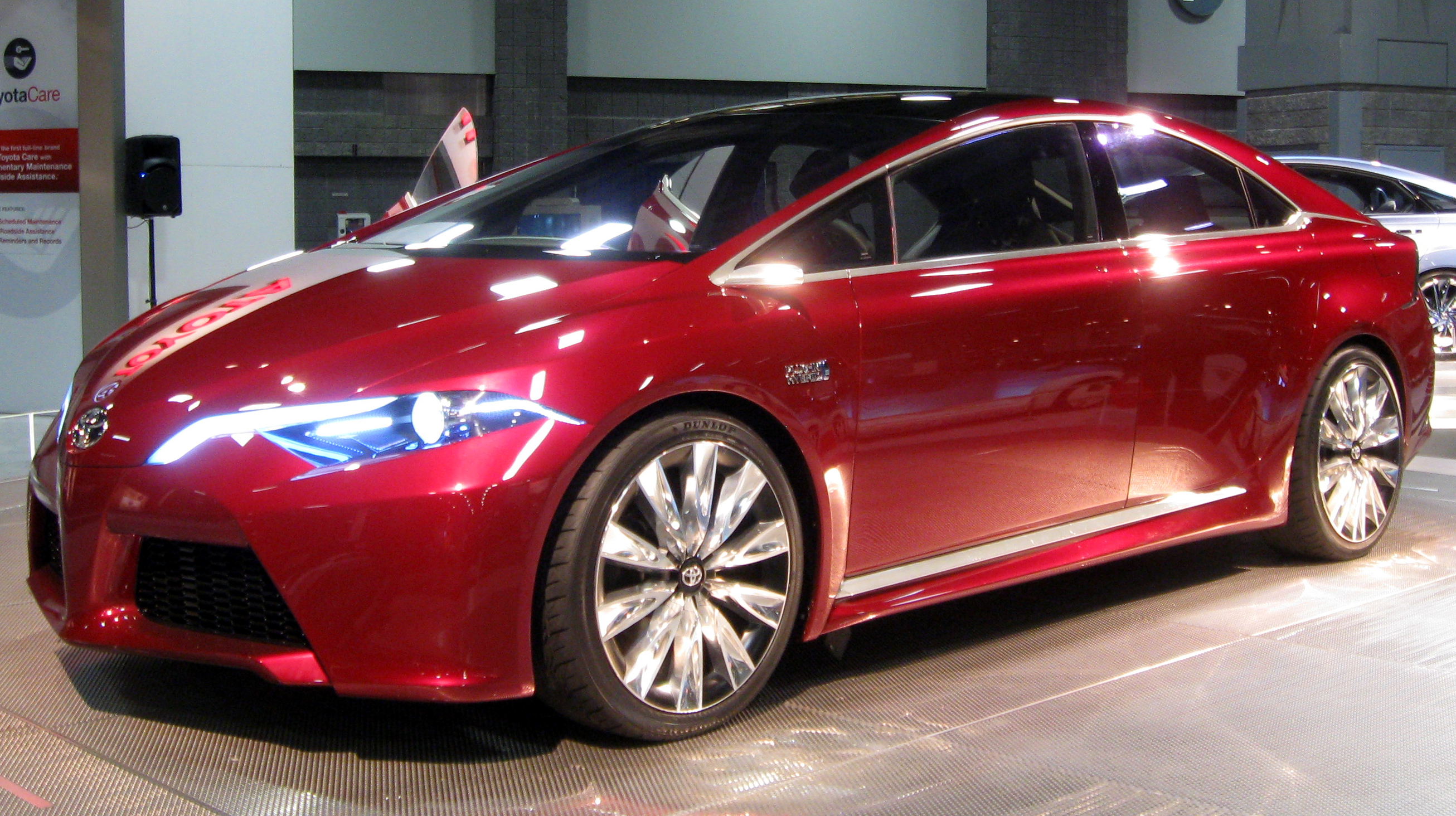

Overview
- Manufacturer: Toyota
- Production: 2012

Body and chassis
- Class: Mid-size car
- Body style: 4-door sedan
- Layout: Front-engine, front-wheel-drive
- Doors: Swan doors
- Related: Toyota Prius

The Toyota NS4 is a plug-in hybrid concept car unveiled at the January 2012 North American International Auto Show.

Safety equipment includes pre-collision radar which alerts the driver and also guides the NS4 away from obstacles, headlights which self-adjust to avoid glare for other vehicles, cameras providing a complete wrap-around view instead of mirrors. A solar panel covers the roof to recharge the battery.

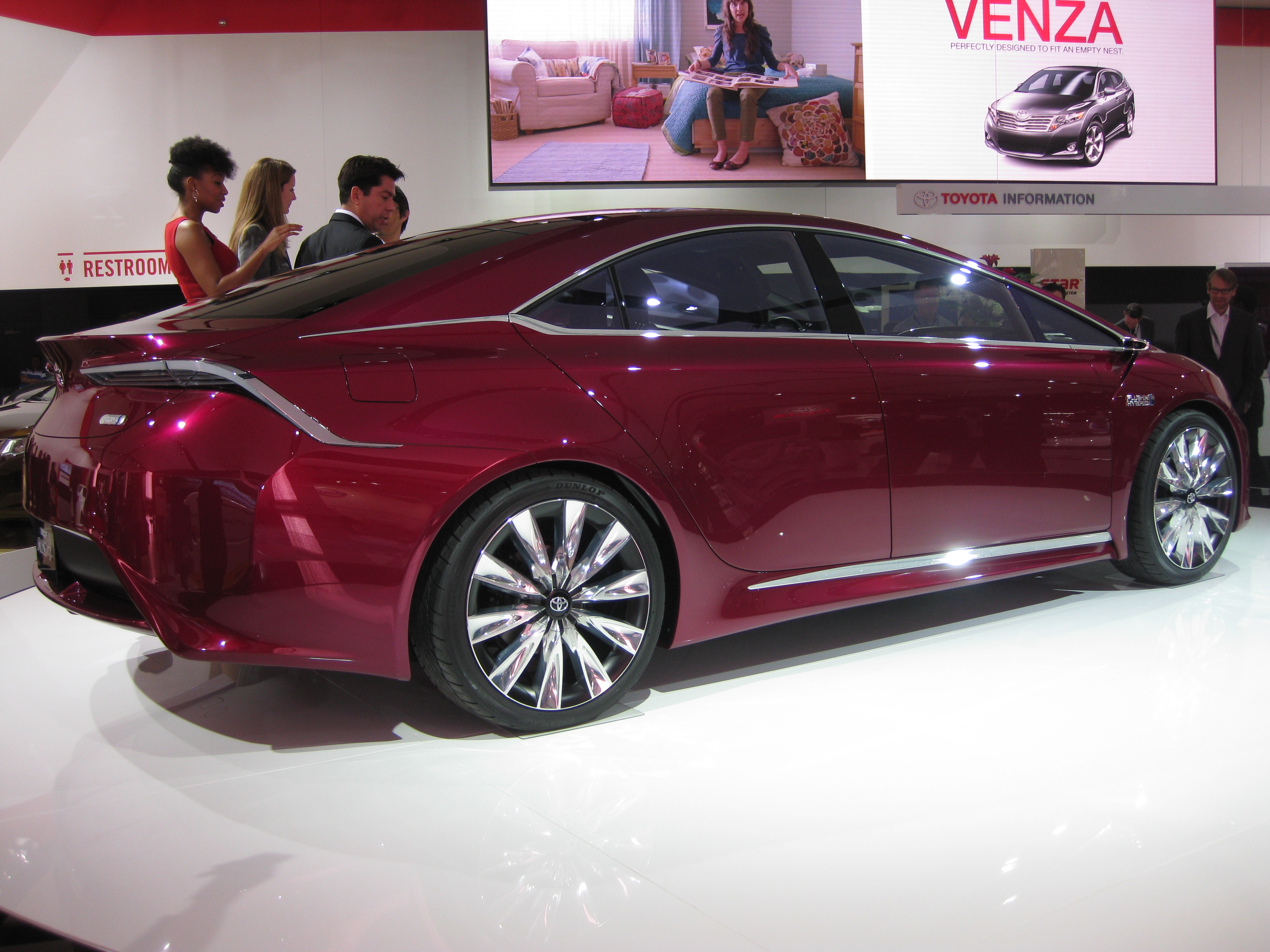
Rear view

== FT-Bh (2012) ==
Toyota FT-Bh
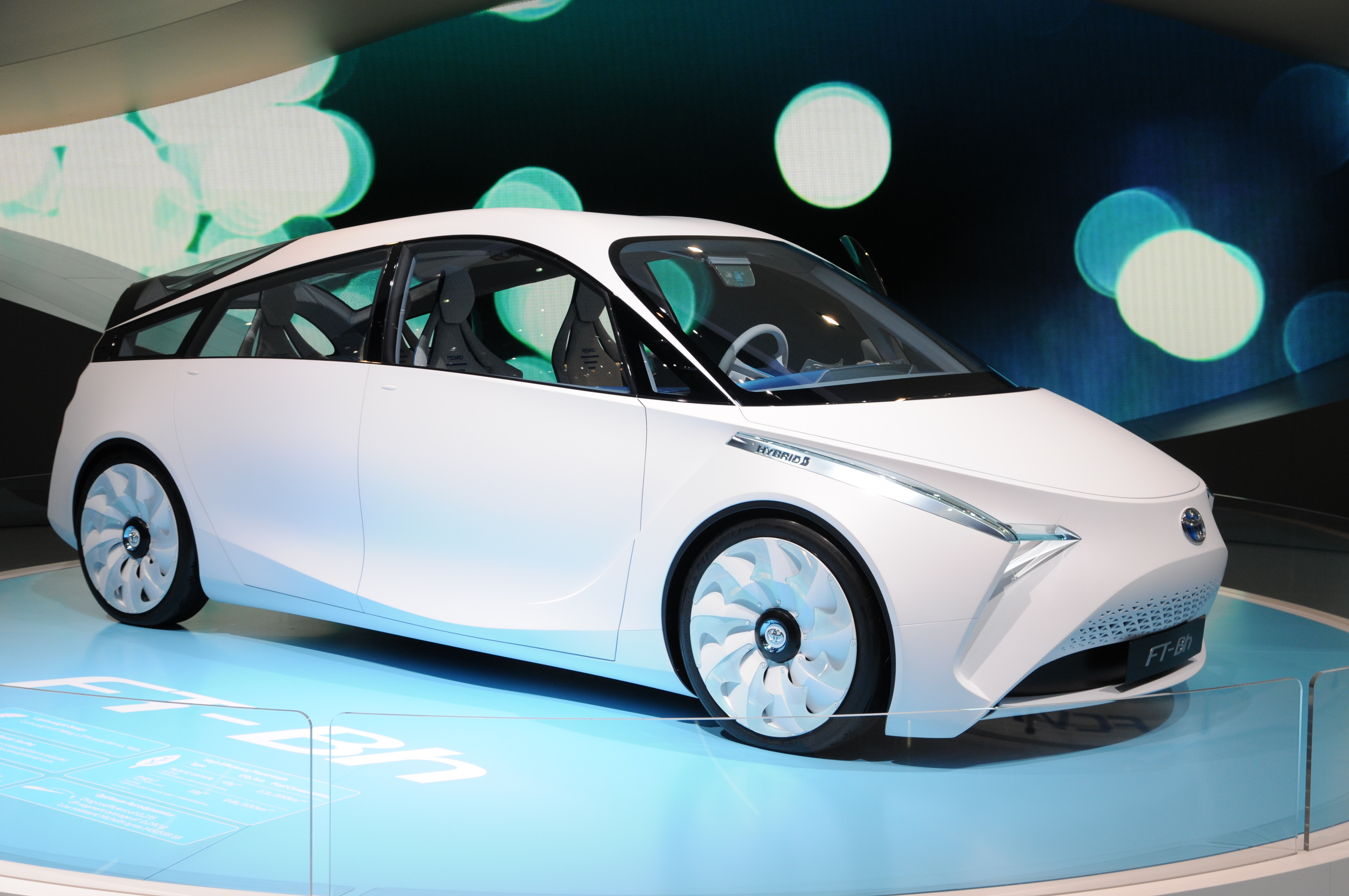

Overview
- Manufacturer: Toyota
- Production: 2012

Body and chassis
- Class: Compact car
- Body style: 5-door hatchback

The Toyota FT-Bh is a hybrid concept car unveiled at the March 2012 Geneva Motor Show.

== Dear Qin (2012) ==
The Toyota Dear Qin is a concept vehicle made by Toyota in 2012. The Dear Qin was featured at the 2012 Beijing Auto Show as a Sedan and Hatchback. It is based on the Toyota Yaris and the Toyota Corolla Hatchback. The vehicle includes LED lights and sleek doors, making a striking concept car. However, the name Qin means "dear", so it is confused if the actual name is the Toyota Dear Dear.

== Camatte Sora, Camatte Daichi, Camatte Takumi (2012) ==
Toyota Camatte Sora, Camatte Daichi, Camatte Takumi
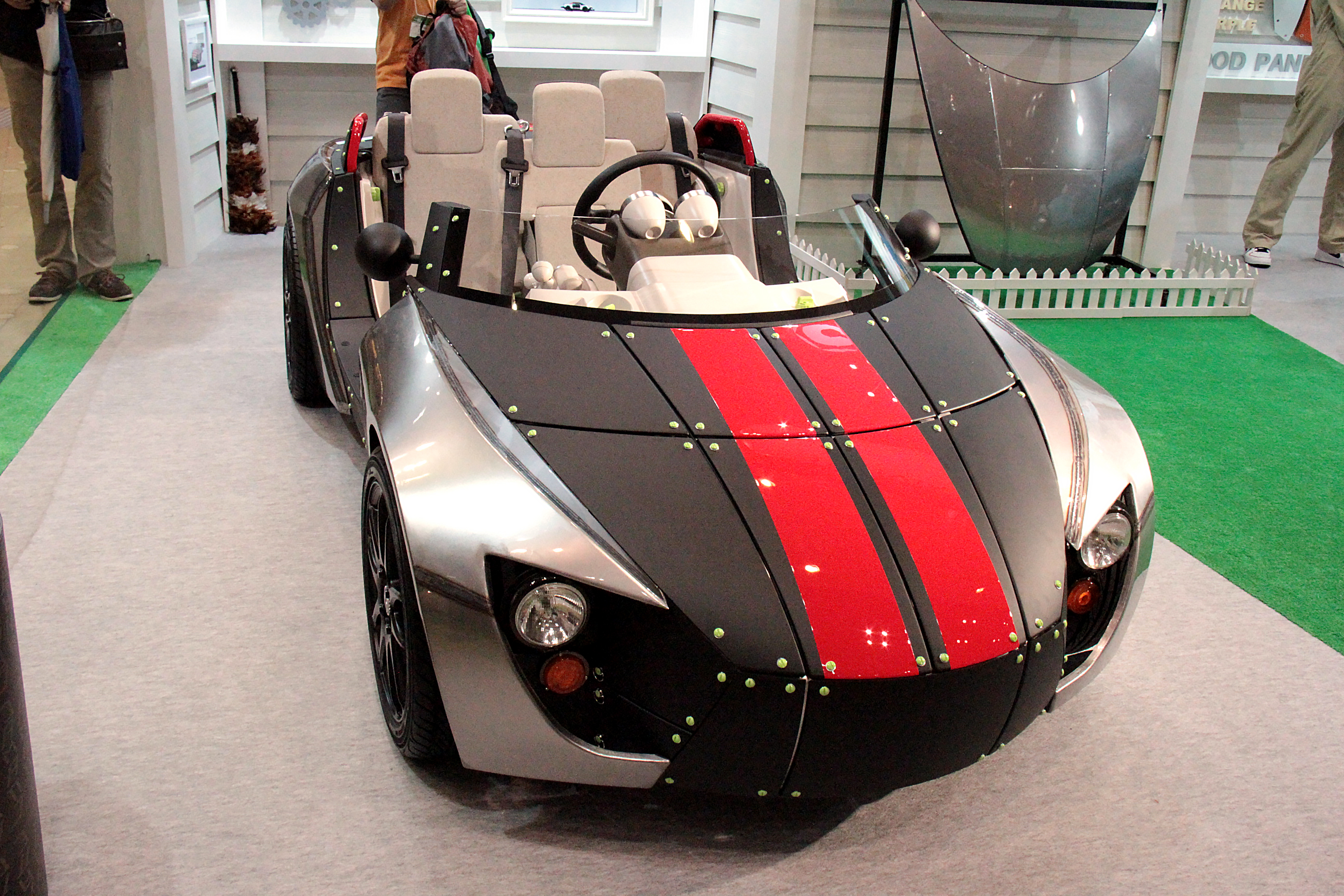

Overview
- Manufacturer: Toyota
- Production: 2012

Body and chassis
- Body style: 2-door 1+2 seating Coupe (Camatte Sora, Camatte Daichi); 0-door roadster (Camatte Takumi)
- Doors: Canopy (Camatte Sora, Camatte Daichi)

Dimensions
- Wheelbase: 1,800 mm (71 in)
- Length: 2,700 mm (106 in)
- Width: 1,300 mm (51 in)
- Height: 1,200 mm (47 in)

Chronology
- Successor: Camatte57s, Camatte57s Sport

The Toyota Camatte is an electric concept car unveiled at the June 2012 Tokyo Toy Show instead of the more usual Tokyo Motor Show. The name 'Camatte' comes from the Japanese word 'kamau', meaning 'care'.

The Camatte's outer panels are removable, allowing the user to customise the body work. Two sets of panels have been shown – the Camatte Sora ('sky') has an aqua and white, rounded design with cycle guards over the front wheels and the Camatte Daichi ('earth') has a sandy brown, angular design with integrated front wheel guards. At the Tokyo Toy Show Toyota showed the body panels being swapped between a Sora and a Daichi.

The Camatte Takumi ('artisan') was later added with a silver Lotus Seven style body. A prototype of the front portion of the Takumi body was shown at the 2012 Tokyo Toy Show next to the completed Sora and Daichi bodies.

The sandy brown Camatte Daichi was made in a pale pink version for the 2014 Beijing International Automotive Exhibition.

== Camatte57s, Camatte57s Sport (2013) ==
Toyota Camatte57s, Camatte57s Sport
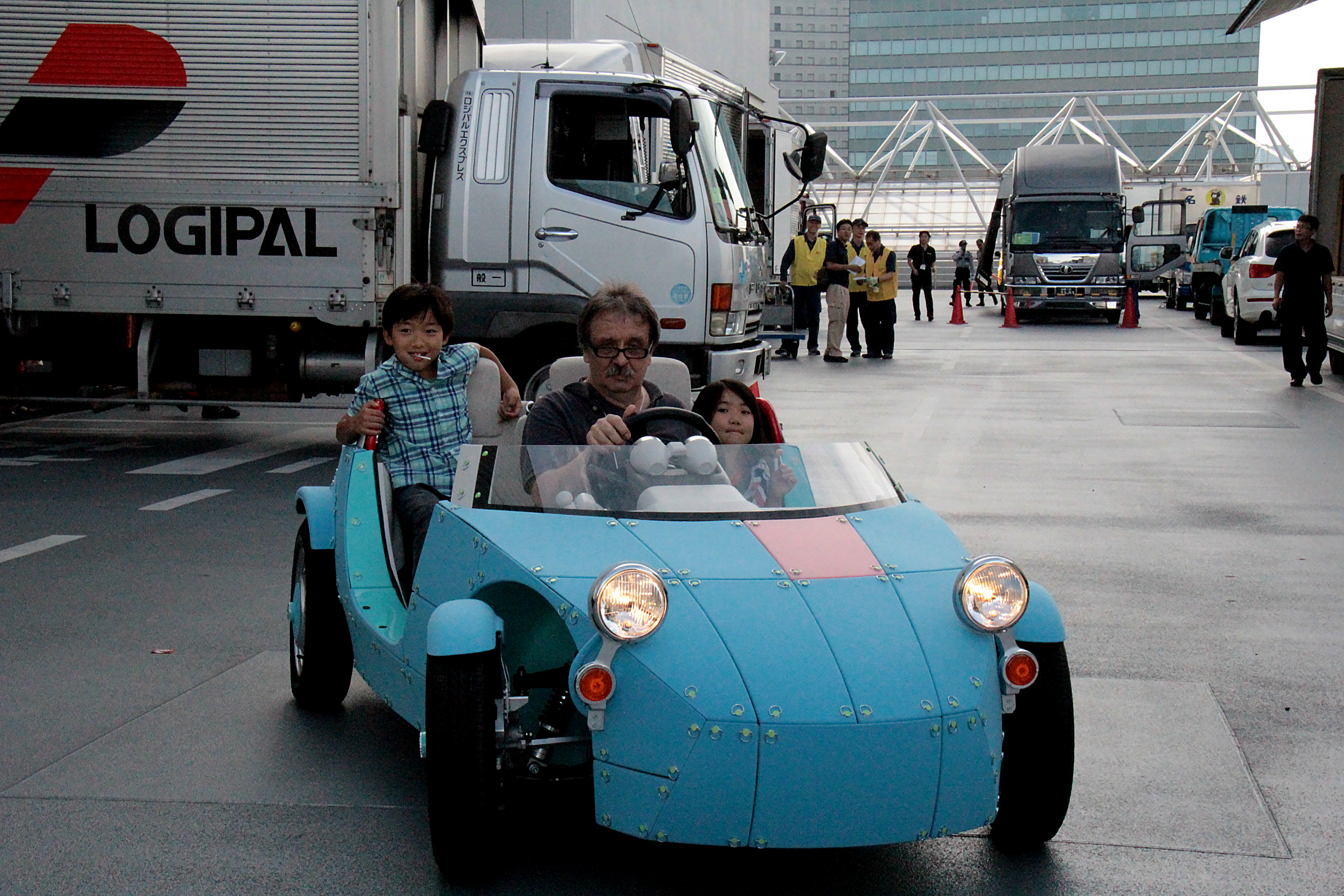
- Toyota Camatte57s

Overview
- Manufacturer: Toyota
- Production: 2013

Body and chassis
- Body style: 2-door 3-seater roadster

Powertrain
- Electric motor: 48V electric motor

Dimensions
- Wheelbase: 1,800 mm (71 in)
- Length: 3,000 mm (118 in)
- Width: 1,400 mm (55 in)
- Height: 1,000 mm (39 in)

Chronology
- Predecessor: Camatte Sora, Camatte Daichi
- Successor: Toyota Camatte57s Sport LED

The Toyota Camatte57s and Toyota Camatte57s Sport are two new bodies for the Toyota Camatte electric chassis that were unveiled at the June 2013 Tokyo Toy Show. The Camatte57s is a roadster with cycle wheels with multiple selections of pastel colours for each panel. The Camatte57s Sport is a roadster with an enclosed wheel sports car style body with black, red and silver body panels.

== Corolla Furia (2013) ==
Toyota Corolla Furia
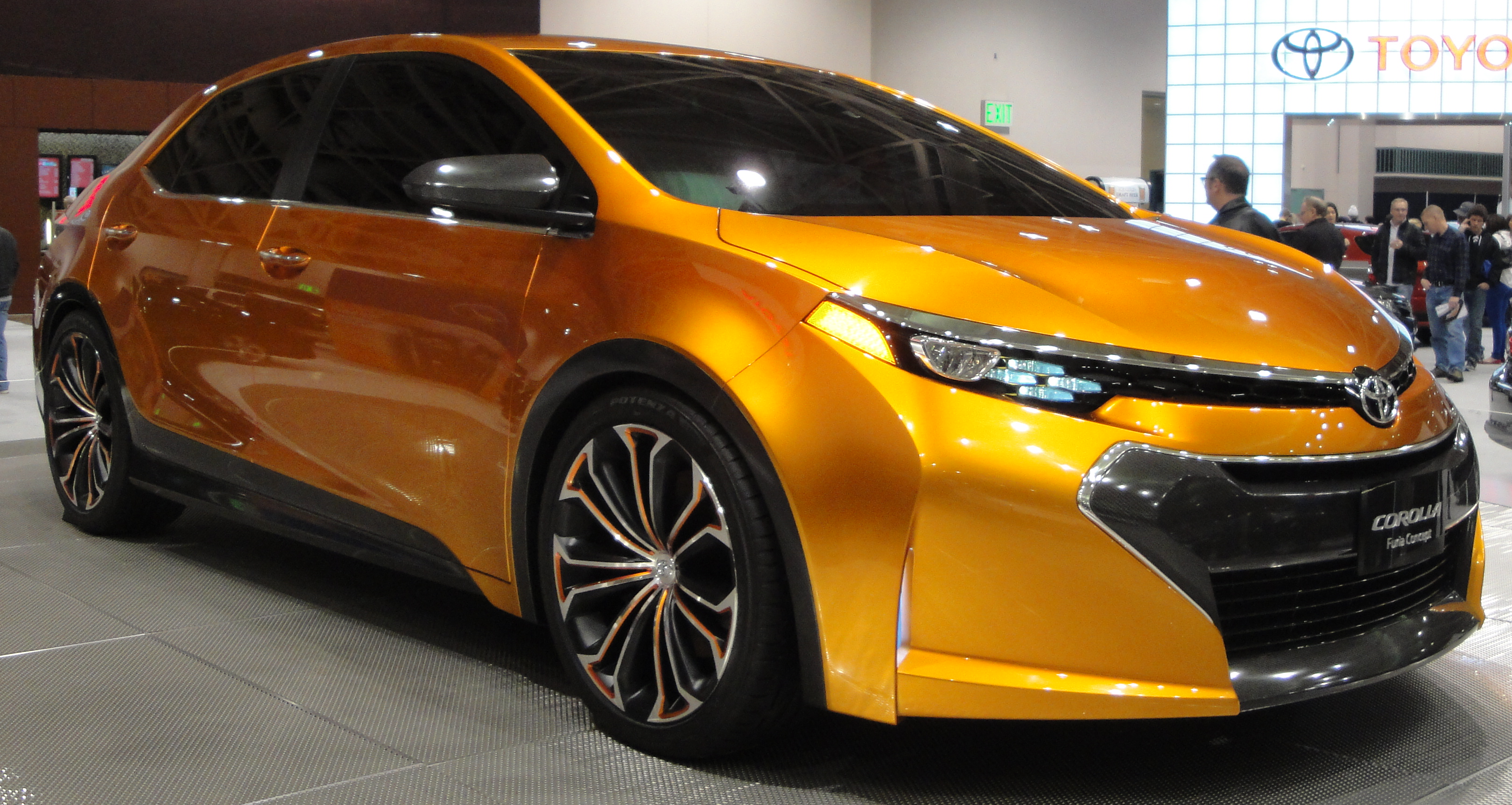

Overview
- Manufacturer: Toyota
- Production: 2013

Body and chassis
- Body style: 4-door sedan
- Related: Toyota Corolla (E170)

The Toyota Corolla Furia is a concept car unveiled at the January 2013 North American International Auto Show. Stylistic elements of the next generation Corolla were previewed in the Furia concept car. Hints of the swept windshield and sloped roofline suggests the brand will follow the industry trend toward raked rear ends and more aerodynamic body shapes. the elements such as the LED lighting seen on the concept that makes it into the Corolla (E170).

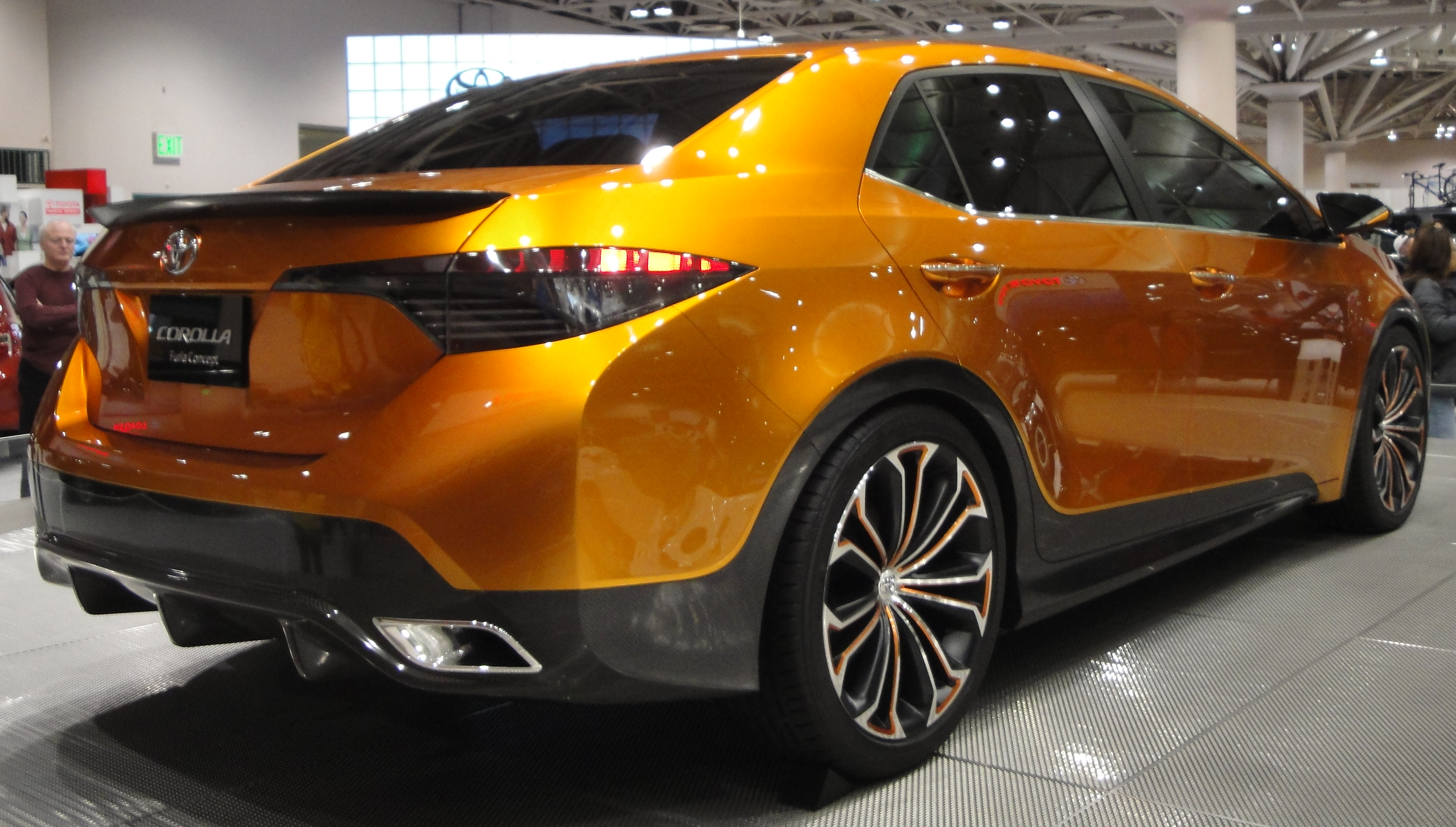
Toyota Furia

== i-Road (2013) ==
Toyota i-Road
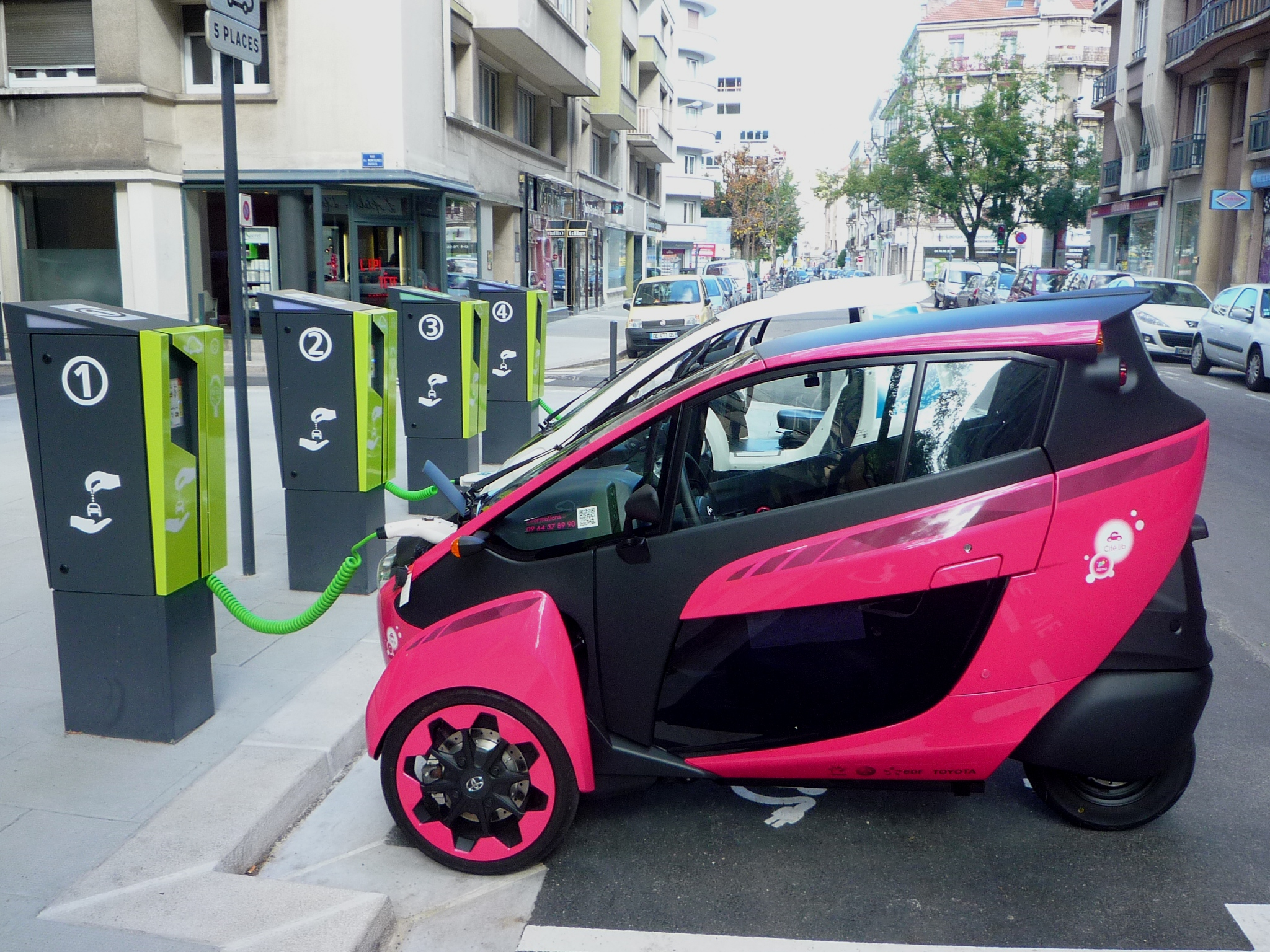
- i-Road in Grenoble (2014)

Overview
- Manufacturer: Toyota
- Production: 2013

Body and chassis
- Class: Three-wheeler City car (A)
- Body style: 3-door hatchback
- Layout: Front-wheel-drive

Powertrain
- Engine: Electric drivetrain
- Electric motor: 2x Wheel hub motors

Dimensions
- Wheelbase: 1,700 mm (66.9 in)
- Length: 2,350 mm (92.5 in)
- Width: 870 mm (34.3 in)
- Height: 1,445 mm (56.9 in)
- Curb weight: 300 kg (660 lb)

The Toyota i-Road is a concept car first shown at the March 2013 Geneva Motor Show. It has an electric drive-train and its two 2 kW (2.7 hp) motors are powered by a lithium-ion battery that can be charged using a household outlet. One charge has a range of 50 km (31 mi) and a top speed of 45 km/h (28 mph). It is designed for city use. It has no emissions at point of use. The vehicle is designed with 3 doors and 2 seats in tandem in a fully enclosed body.

Car and Driver describes the Toyota i-Road as "something of a cross between a car, a motorcycle, and a fancy golf cart". It is similar to the concept of a motorcycle but has three wheels. Toyota has developed what it calls "Active Lean", a new technology that helps provide the centripetal force to make the vehicle go around a corner and smooths the ride over rough ground. "Active Lean" operates using an on-board computers on each side of the front suspension to calculate the degree of lean needed based on input from the steering mechanism, the gyroscope angle and speed. To compensate for road conditions, a front wheel is adjusted up or down as needed to stabilise the vehicle. According to Wired, this technology "allows you to bomb through the bends without tipping over."

Toyota refers to it as a "personal mobility vehicle". The width is 850 mm (33.5 in), approximately the same width as a motorcycle, and four of these vehicles can be parked in a single parking space. It seats two people in an enclosed cabin that protects the occupants from the environment. Its turning radius is about 2.7 m (9 ft).

Currently, the Toyota i-Road is a concept car envisioned for urban use in the future, and there are no plans for general production at this time, although it was announced in March 2013 that 70 i-Roads would be deployed in Grenoble as part of a last-mile mobility project. The project will be managed within an existing car club. The i-Road will also be part of Toyota's similar ha:mo project in Toyota City, Japan.

== JPN Taxi Concept (2013) ==
Toyota JPN Taxi Concept
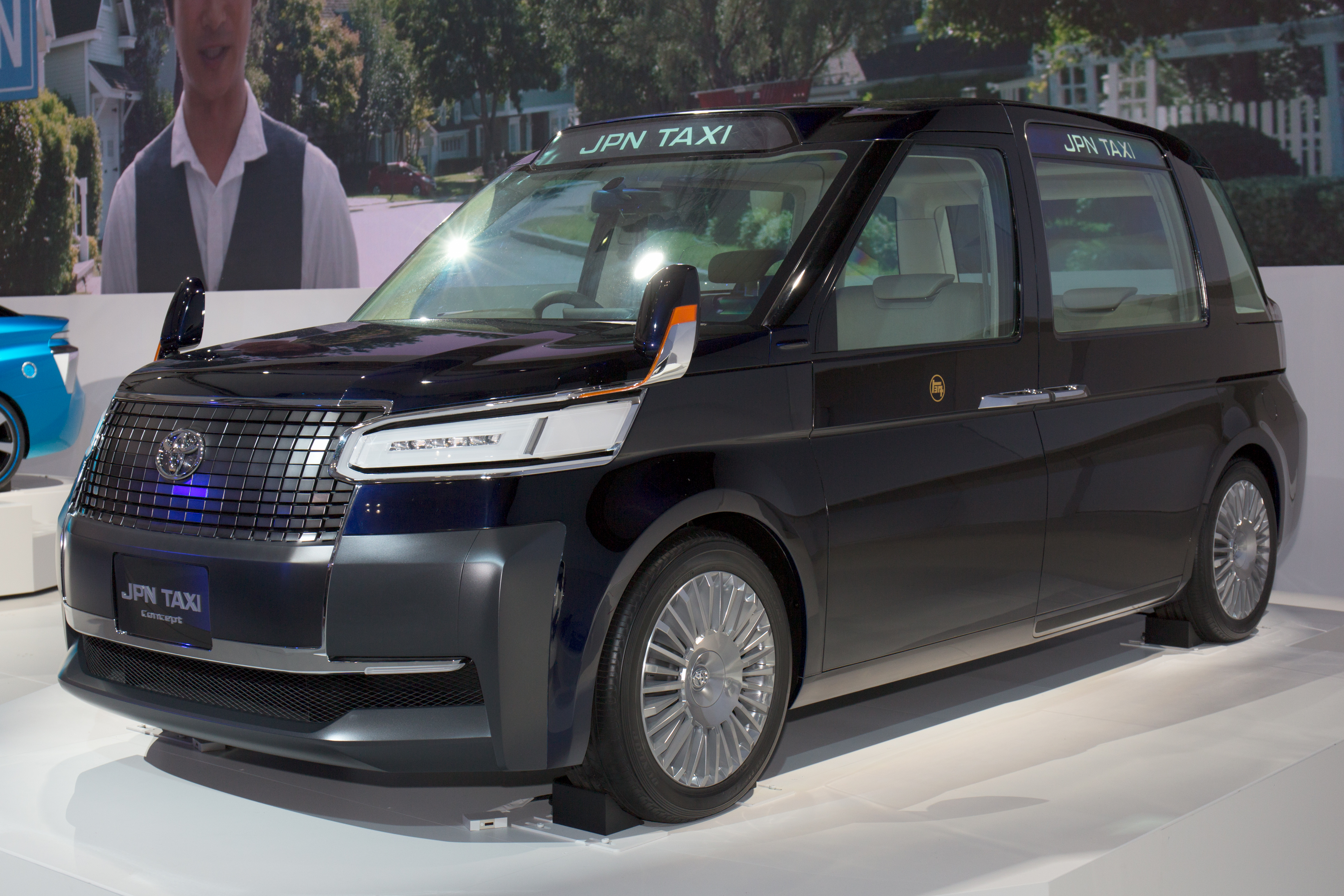

Overview
- Manufacturer: Toyota
- Production: 2013

Body and chassis
- Body style: 5-door minivan (taxi)

Dimensions
- Wheelbase: 2,750 mm (108.3 in)
- Length: 4,350 mm (171.3 in)
- Width: 1,695 mm (66.7 in)
- Height: 1,700 mm (66.9 in)

Chronology
- Successor: Toyota JPN Taxi

The Toyota JPN Taxi Concept is a concept taxi unveiled at the January 2013 Tokyo Motor Show.

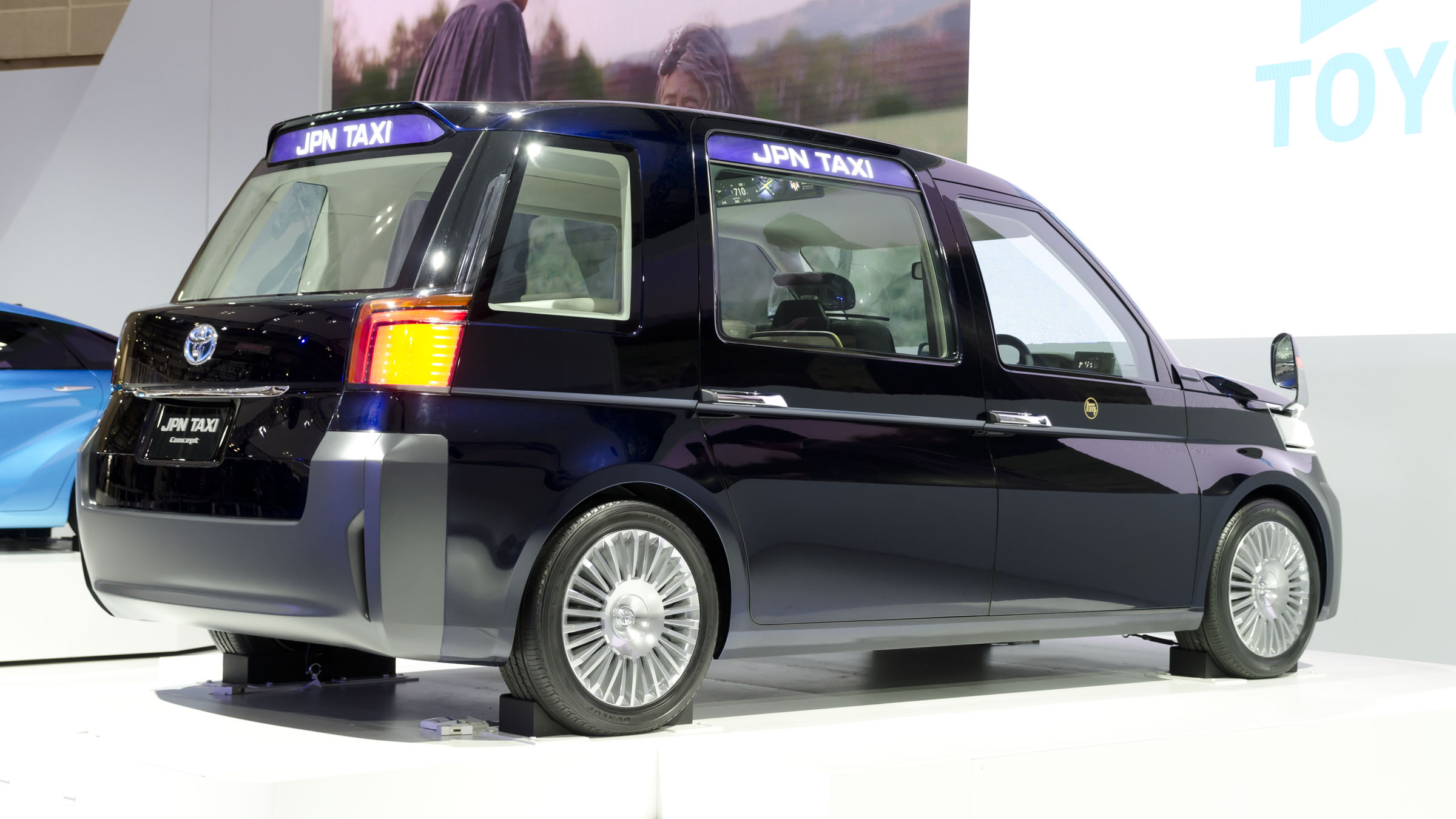
Rear view

== Me.We (2013) ==
Toyota Me.WE

Overview
- Manufacturer: Toyota
- Production: 2013

Body and chassis
- Body style: 5-door hatchback

Dimensions
- Length: 3,400 mm
- Width: 1,750 mm
- Height: 1,600 mm
- Curb weight: 750 kg

The Toyota Me.We is a concept made by Toyota in 2013. It is covered in 100-percent recyclable polypropylene. The Me.We is a mix of a pickup, convertible, off-roader, and small city car.

== RAV4 Adventure (2013) ==
Toyota RAV4 Adventure
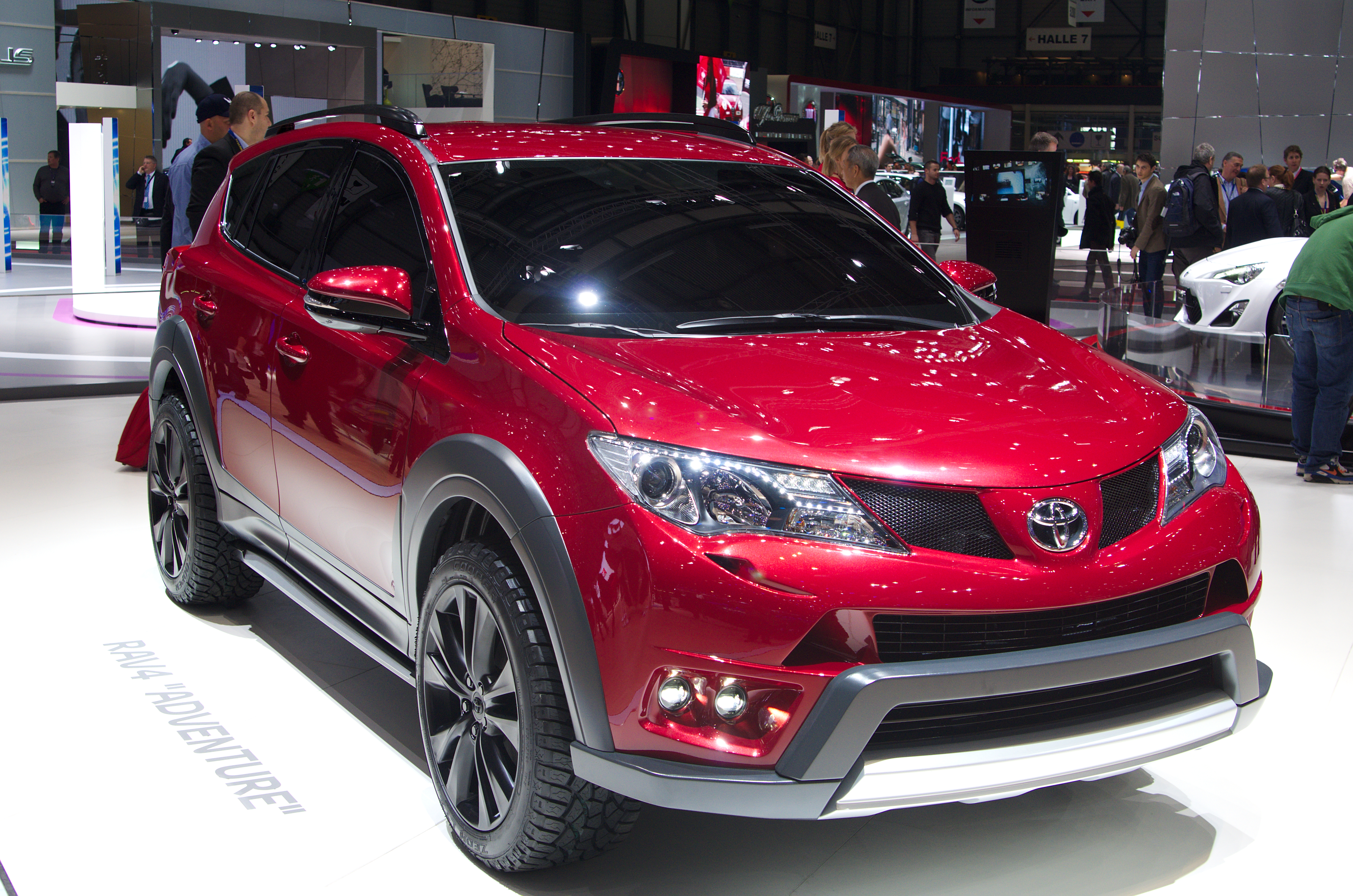

Overview
- Manufacturer: Toyota
- Production: 2013

Body and chassis
- Layout: Front-engine, four-wheel drive

Chronology
- Predecessor: RAV4

The Toyota RAV4 Adventure is a concept car unveiled at the March 2013 Geneva Auto Show.

== RAV4 Premium (2013) ==
Toyota RAV4 Premium

Overview
- Manufacturer: Toyota
- Production: 2013

Body and chassis
- Layout: Front-engine, four-wheel drive

Chronology
- Predecessor: RAV4

The Toyota RAV4 Premium is a concept car unveiled at the March 2013 Geneva Auto Show.

== U2 (2014) ==
Toyota U2

Overview
- Manufacturer: Toyota
- Production: 2014
- Designer: Calty Design Research

Body and chassis
- Class: Light commercial vehicle
- Body style: 2-/3-door van
- Layout: FF layout

Powertrain
- Engine: 1.5-liter DOHC 16–valve 1NZ-FXE I4 VVT-i (Atkinson cycle)
- Electric motor: 1NM AC synchronous
- Transmission: automatic
- Hybrid drivetrain: Power-split
- Battery: Nickel-metal hydride

The U2 is a concept car made by Toyota in 2014. It was shown at the 2016 Canadian International Auto Show and the 2014 Maker Faire, in San Francisco. U2 stands for Urban Utility Concept, and is pronounced "U squared". The body shape has aspects of the Nissan S-Cargo, Toyota Highlander, and the Toyota RAV4. The exterior includes a tie-down system, a roll-back roof, a drop-down rear tailgate that can double as a ramp, and roll-down tailgate glass. The vehicle was shown with only a single seat, while the rest is cargo space. There is room for an optional passenger seat. The interior is completely covered in plastic panels.

== TE-Spyder 800 (2014) ==
Toyota TE-Spyder 800
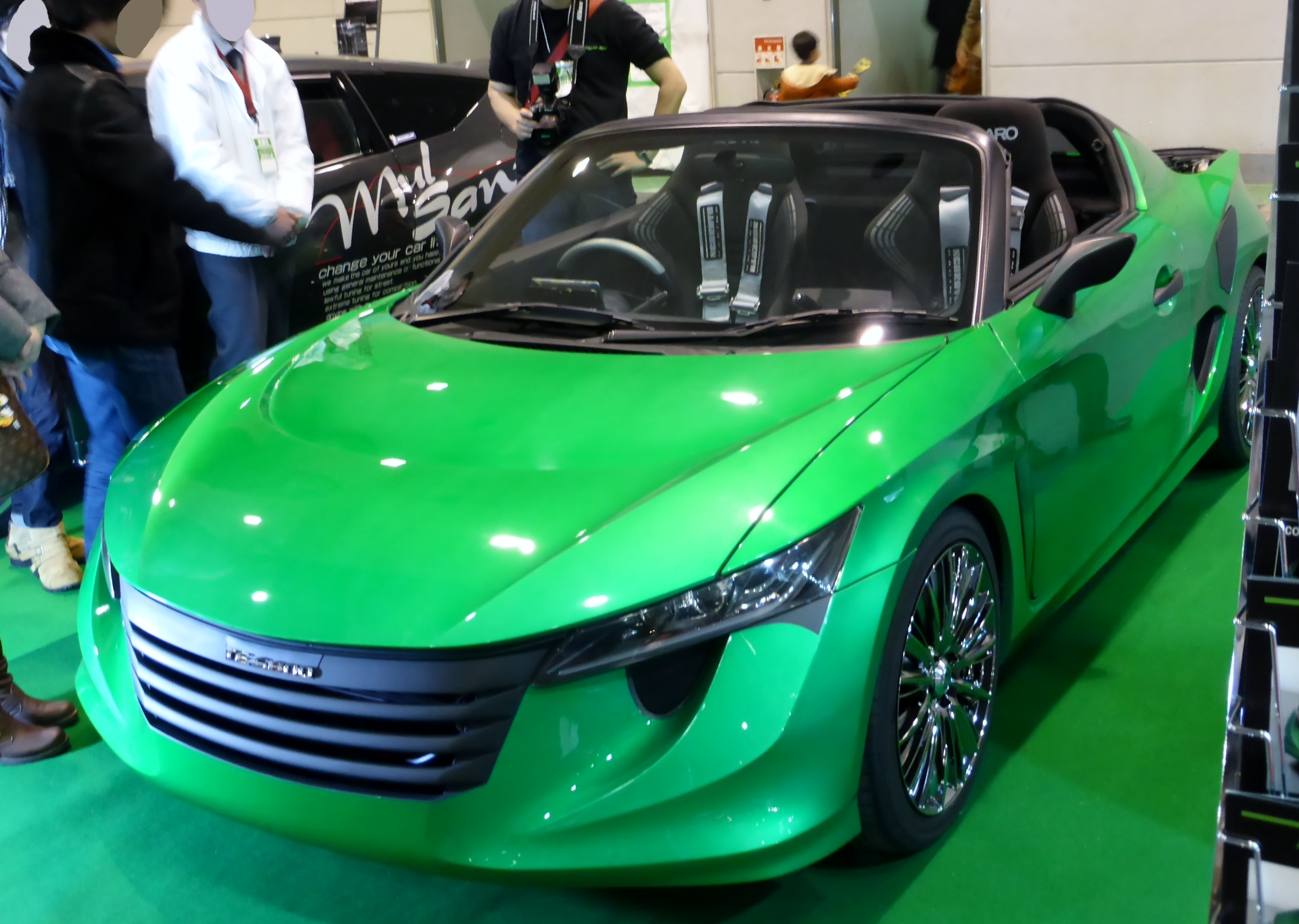

Overview
- Manufacturer: Toyota
- Production: 2014
- Designer: Toyota Skunkworks

Body and chassis
- Class: Sport car
- Body style: 2-door coupe

Powertrain
- Engine: 1.5-litre NZ, 75 kW (102 PS) electric
- Transmission: E-CVT

Chronology
- Predecessor: third generation MR2

The Toyota TE-Spyder 800 is a concept vehicle made by Toyota in 2014. It was introduced at the 2014 Tokyo Auto Salon. It is based on the third generation MR2. The NZ engine generates 85 kW (116 PS) at 6400rpm.

== Camatte57s Sport LED (2014) ==
Toyota Camatte57s Sport LED

Overview
- Manufacturer: Toyota
- Production: 2014

Body and chassis
- Body style: 2-door roadster

Powertrain
- Engine: 48V electric motor

Dimensions
- Wheelbase: 1,800 mm (71 in)
- Length: 3,000 mm (118 in)
- Width: 1,400 mm (55 in)
- Height: 1,000 mm (39 in)

Chronology
- Predecessor: Camatte57s, Camatte57s Sport
- Successor: Toyota Camatte Hajime

The Toyota Camatte57s Sport LED was unveiled at the June 2014 Tokyo Toy Show as an updated body for the 2014 Toyota Camatte57s Sport electric chassis. The body is the same as the previous year except for an LED panel on the bonnet. Children can draw pictures on paper, which are scanned and then displayed on the bonnet. A Camatte chassis without body panels was also displayed at the same show booth to show children how a car works.

== FT-1 (2014) ==
Toyota FT-1
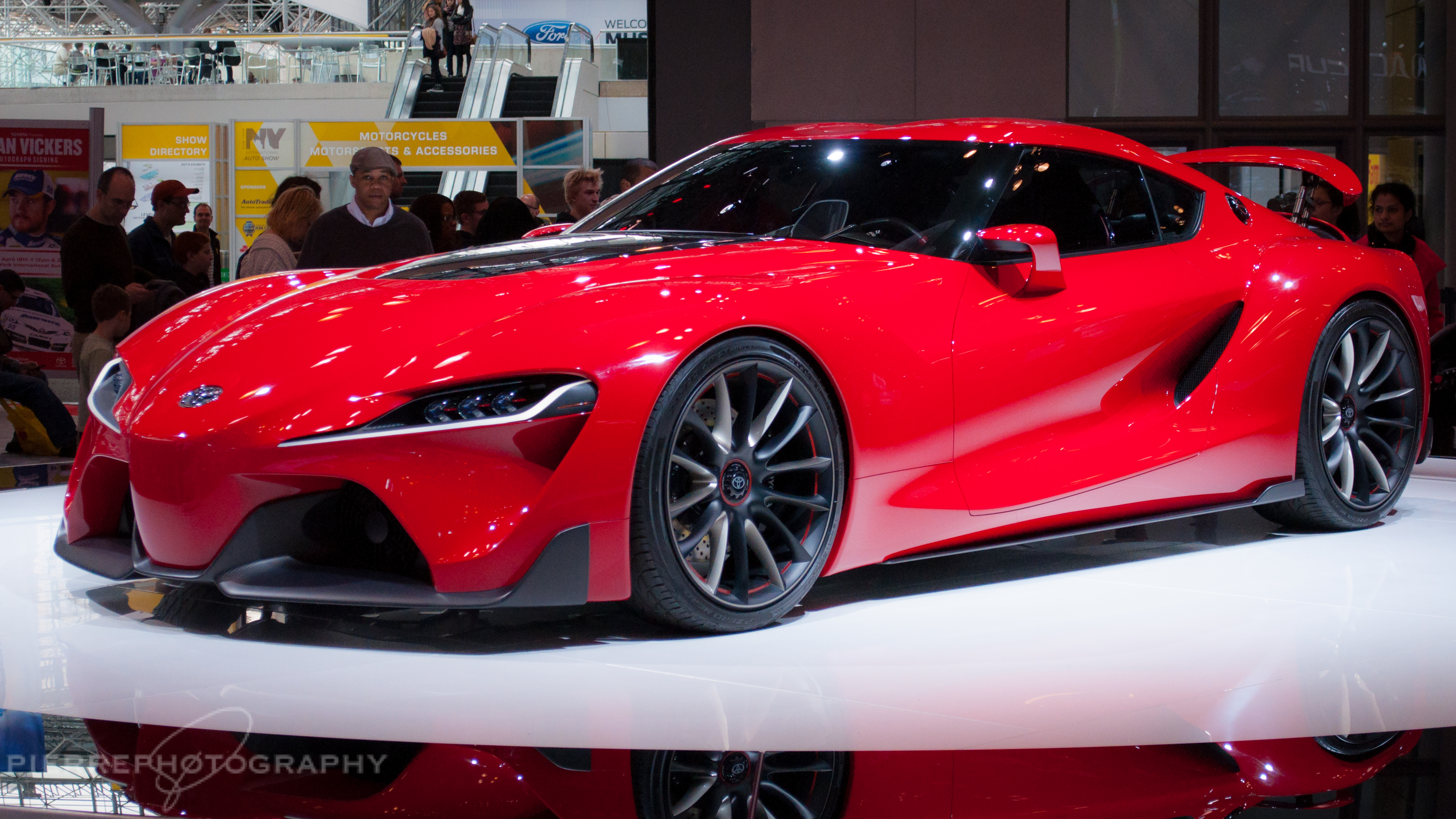

Overview
- Manufacturer: Toyota
- Production: 2014

Body and chassis
- Class: Sports car
- Body style: 2-door 2+2 coupe
- Layout: FR layout
- Doors: Swan doors
- Related: Toyota Supra (J29/DB)

Powertrain
- Engine: 3.0L turbocharged DOHC 24-valve I6 340 PS (250 kW; 335 hp)
- Transmission: 8-speed automatic

Dimensions
- Wheelbase: 2,740 mm (107.9 in)
- Length: 4,675 mm (184.1 in)
- Width: 1,970 mm (77.6 in)
- Height: 1,225 mm (48.2 in)

Chronology
- Successor: GR Supra Racing Concept

The Toyota FT-1 is a concept car unveiled at the January 2014 North American International Auto Show. 'FT' stands for Future Toyota. While '1' means number one or the ultimate one. Little is known about this new concept car; other than that it has a front engine and rear wheel drive layout. Toyota did also state their new concept car draws inspiration from Toyota's past sports cars like the 2000GT, Supra, MR-2, and 2007 FT-HS concept car. Toyota did not state whether the FT-1 would use the Supra name, or if it was even bound for production. However, Toyota did say if the FT-1 is approved from production to expect a price tag of around US$60,000.

Work on the FT-1 began nearly two years prior to the presentation. Kevin Hunter, the president of Calty Design Research in California stated that Lexus had the LFA and Scion has the FR-S, but Toyota has nothing. Mr. Hunter then pitched his idea to Toyota's CEO, Akio Toyoda for a halo flagship sports car for the Toyota brand. After receiving approval to build a concept, Calty designers began to sketch ideas and different concepts. In the end, a front engine rear wheel drive layout was chosen. Toyota has not disclosed the cost of building its FT-1 concept, but it is noted that concept cars usually cost around a US$1 million to build. Hunter had stated that the FT-1 is still in the concept stage with no current production plans. He added that if the public's reaction is positive it would only help to move the FT-1 from concept to production and that anything is possible in the future. Alex Shen, the studio chief designer, also hinted at a US$60,000 price tag. He was quoted saying, "It's a Toyota, it ought to be affordable."

The FT-1's overall design was eventually incorporated into the fifth generation Toyota Supra (J29/DB), which launched in 2019 for the 2020 model year. However, much of the design had to have updated proportions and dimensions during co-development alongside BMW, due to being adapted around the significantly smaller BMW Z4 (G29) platform's shared hardpoints. Additionally, Toyota's goal of a price tag around US$60,000 for the production version of the FT-1 was achieved, with the fifth generation Supra being priced at US$49,990 starting MSRP along with a front engine rear wheel drive layout as proposed.

FT-1 Graphite Concept

A second FT-1 was created and shown at the Monterey Jet Center in Monterey, California in August 2014. It was painted in a gray colour rather than the first car's red colour to shift perception of the vehicle.

FT-1 Vision Gran Turismo

To commemorate the 15th anniversary of the popular video game series, Gran Turismo 6 will feature a festival called "Vision Gran Turismo" (name reused from early GT5 trailer), featuring concept cars designed for the game by top automobile companies. Toyota created a unique design of the FT-1 concept called the FT-1 VGT, featuring more aggressive and race inspired body work similar to the GT500 machines from the Super GT series. A Gr.3 version, based on FIA GT3 regulations, was later created for the game's sequel, Gran Turismo Sport.

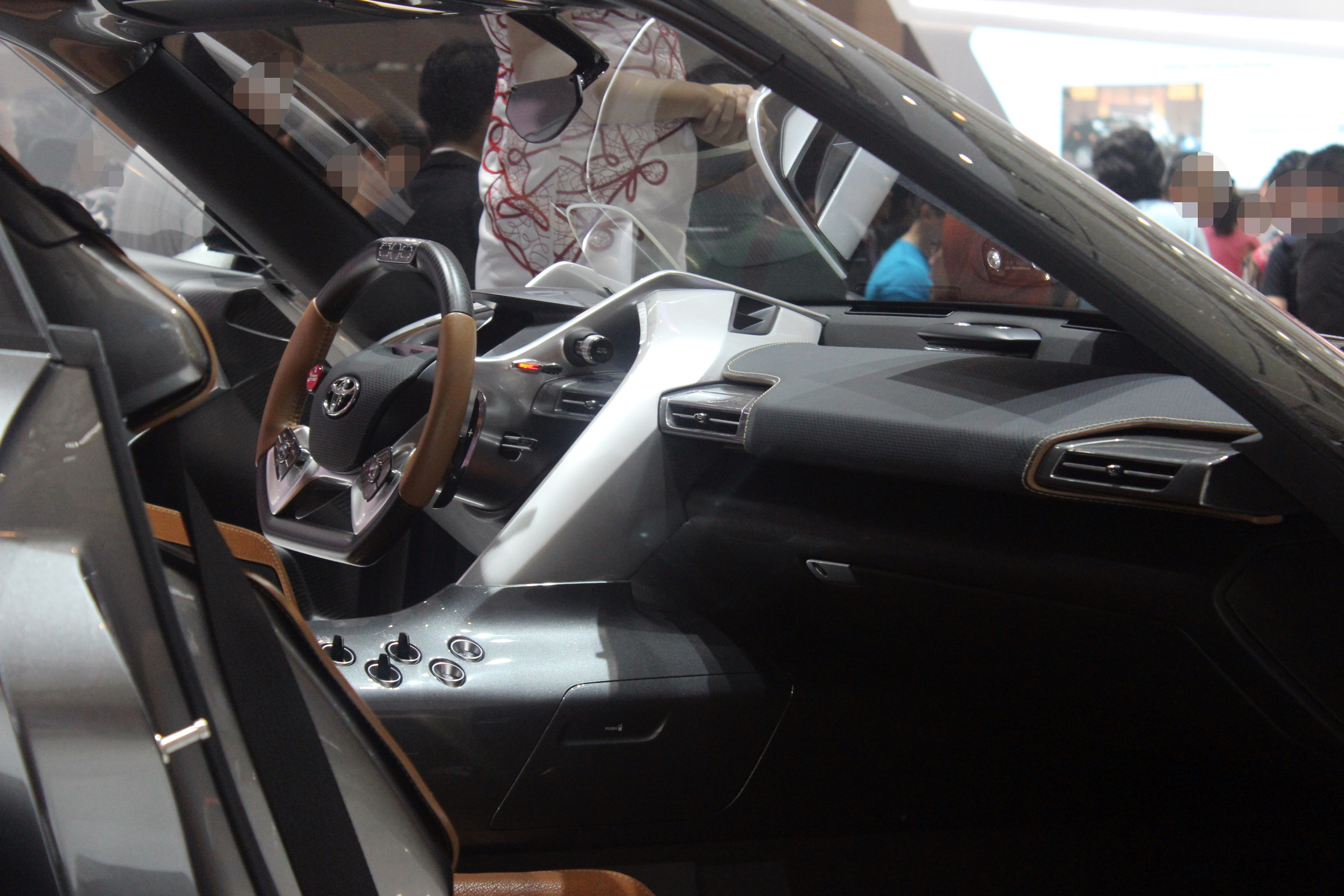
FT-1 interior

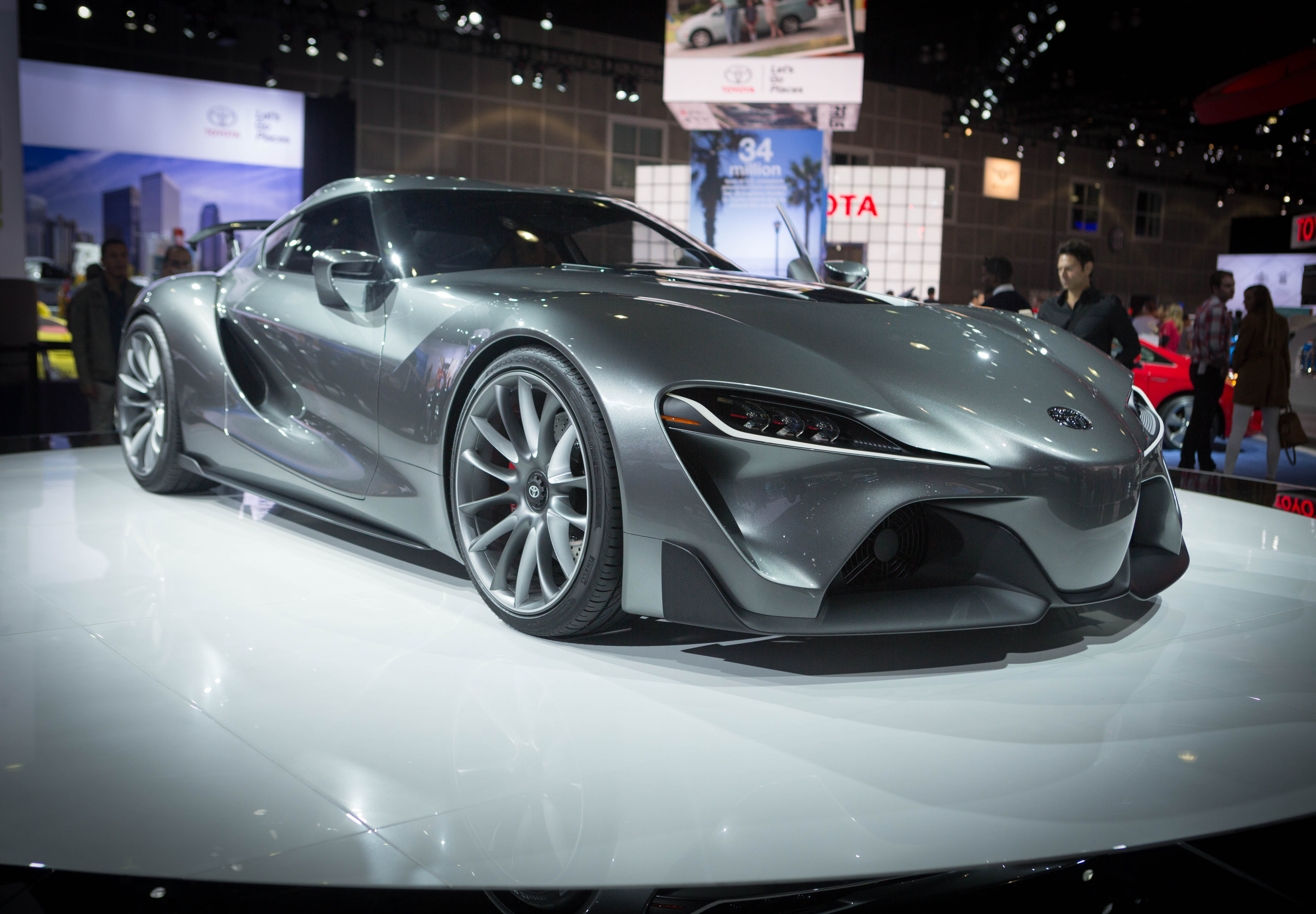
FT-1 Graphite Concept

== C-HR Concept (2014–2017) ==
Toyota C-HR Concept
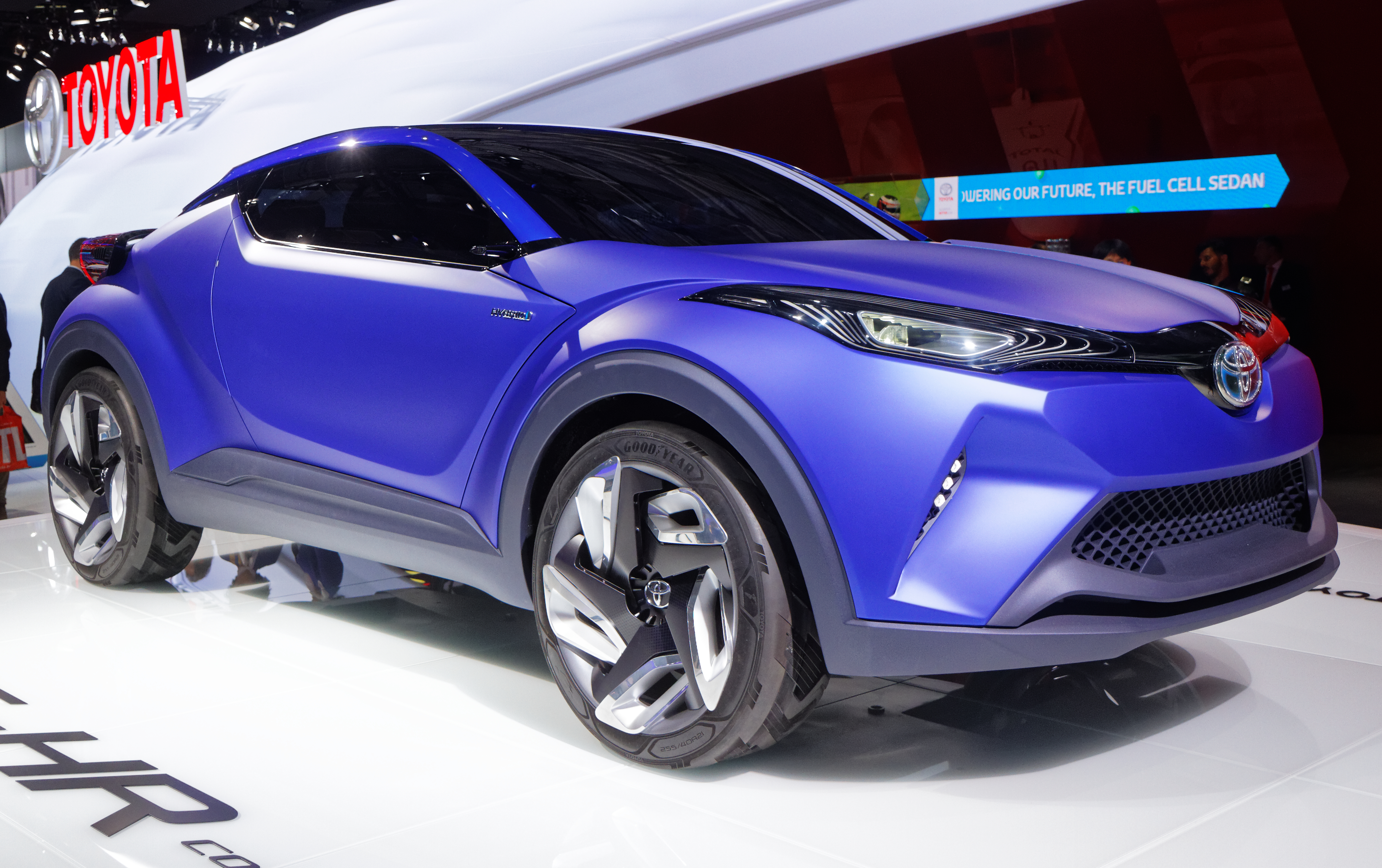
- C-HR at the 2014 Mondial de l'Automobile de Paris

Overview
- Manufacturer: Toyota
- Also called: Scion C-HR Concept (North America); Toyota Fengchao Way (China, 2017)
- Production: 2014

Body and chassis
- Layout: Front-engine, four-wheel drive

Dimensions
- Wheelbase: 2,640 mm (103.9 in)
- Length: 4,350 mm (171.3 in)
- Width: 1,850 mm (72.8 in)
- Height: 1,500 mm (59.1 in)

Chronology
- Successor: Toyota C-HR

The Toyota C-HR Concept is a concept car unveiled at the October 2014 Paris Motor Show. It represents a styling exercise for a 2-door compact crossover SUV. An updated more production-intent version was shown at the September 2015 Frankfurt Motor Show, now with additional rear doors and gray paint. A third version in red was shown at the November 2015 LA Auto Show as the Scion CH-R Concept, with styling closer to the original 2014 concept, but with rear doors like the 2015 Toyota concept. The Scion concept was also displayed at the 2016 Montreal International Auto Show and the New York International Auto Show, but as a Toyota due to the phase out of the Scion brand. The production model was launched in November 2016.

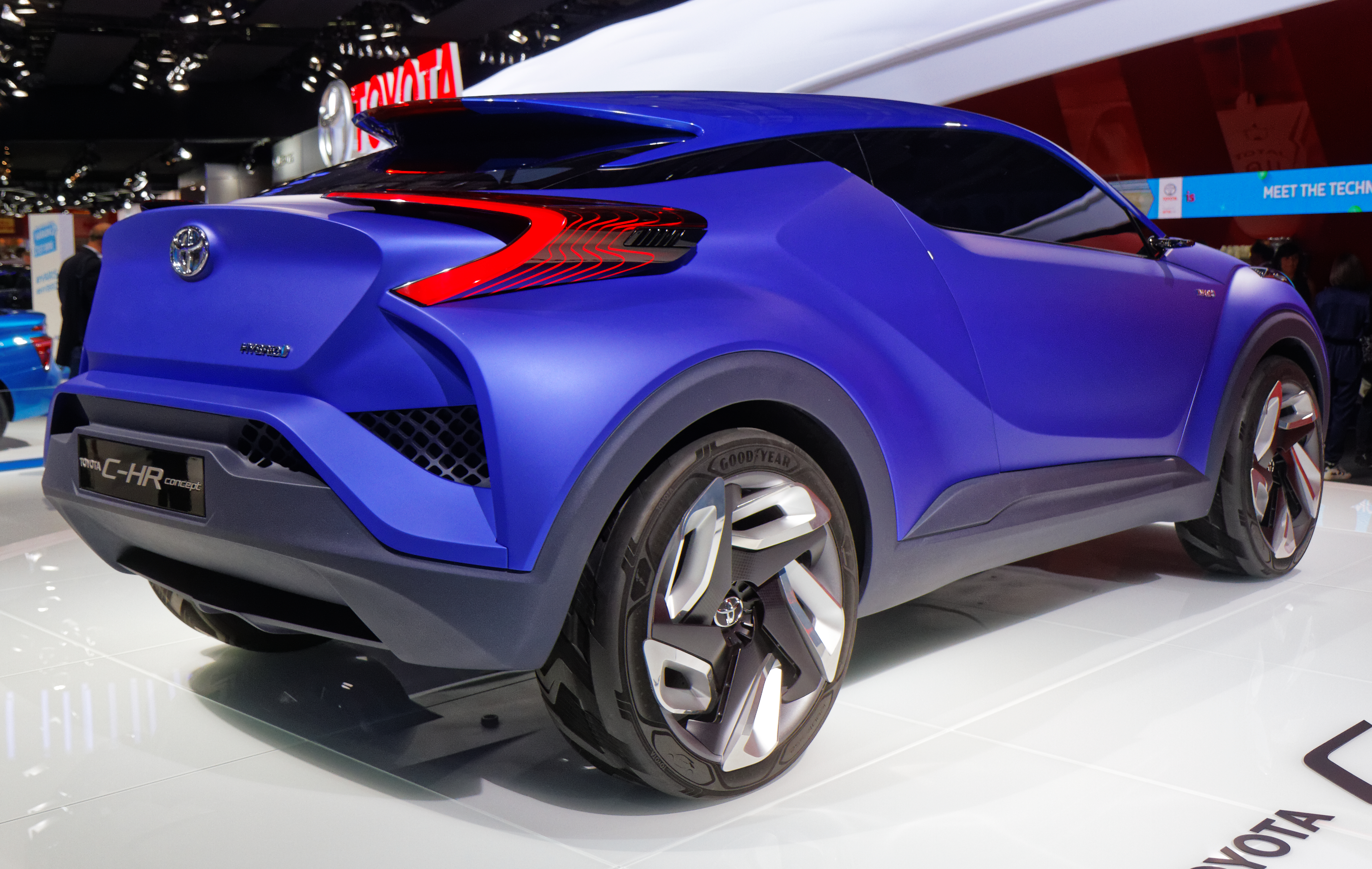
C-HR concept at the 2014 Mondial de l'Automobile de Paris – rear

== FV, FV2 (2014) ==
Toyota FV
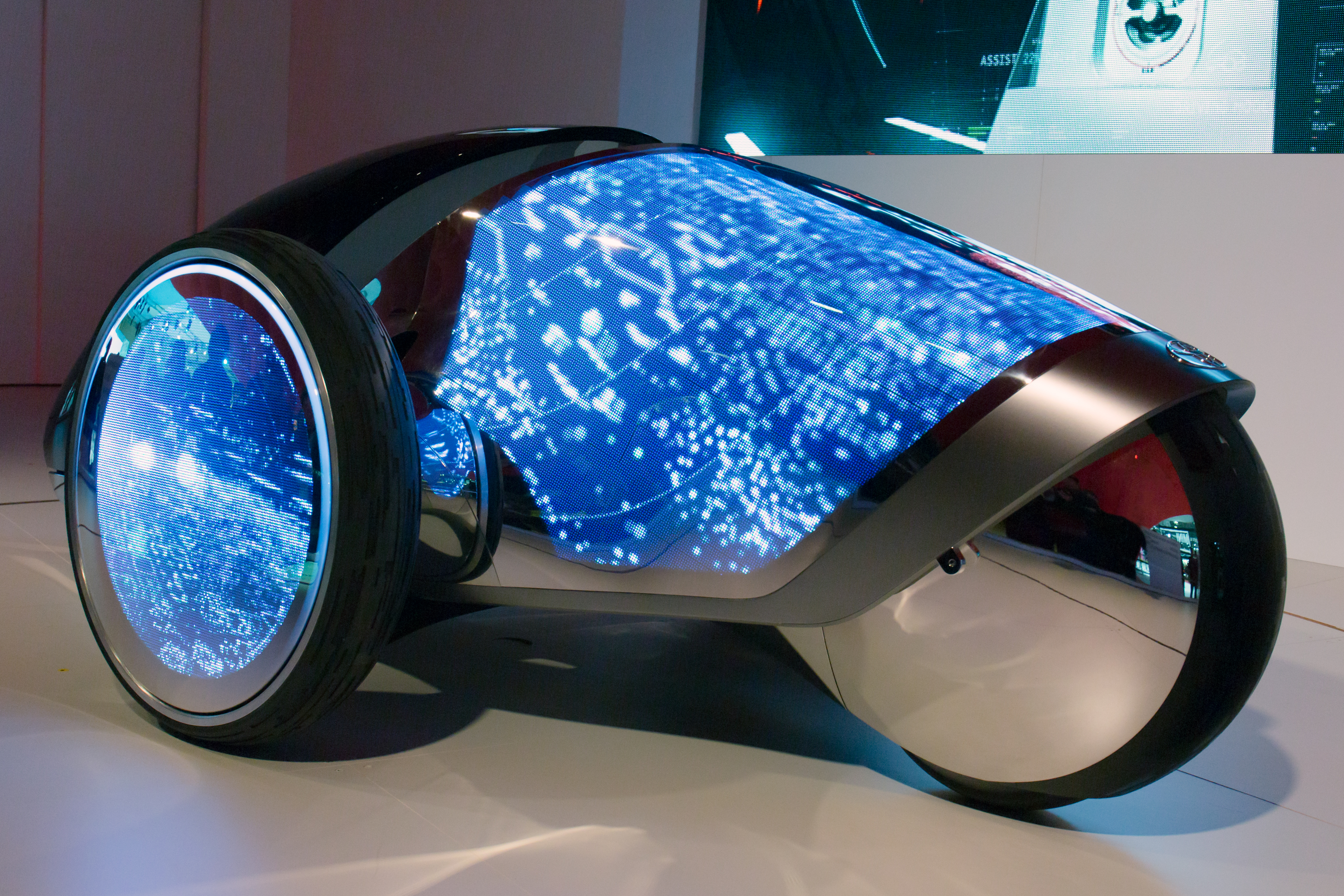

Overview
- Manufacturer: Toyota
- Also called: Toyota FV2
- Production: 2014

Dimensions
- Length: 3,000 mm (118.1 in)
- Width: 1,600 mm (63.0 in)
- Height: 990 mm (39.0 in)

The Toyota FV (also known as the FV2) is a concept car introduced at the 2014 Geneva Motor Show. The car has no steering wheel to grab hold of, so instead, the FV is operated by the driver shifting their body weight, intuitively moving the car forwards or backwards, left and right. It is connected to an intelligent transport system technology, which means you stay safe while having fun. A wide variety of local safety information captured from other vehicles and traffic infrastructure aids the driver of the FV to deal with dangers such as blind spots at junctions. By incorporating technology under development in the Toyota Heart Project, both the driver and the FV can grow together. Using both voice and image recognition to determine the driver's mood, the car will accumulate driving history to suggest driving routes and even determine the driver's skill level to assist in driving technique. Also, to give your FV2 the personal touch, its body colour and exterior display can be changed to match your mood. It can reach speeds of up to 160 km/h (100 mph), and has a price tag of US$45,000.

== 86 Tomica Concept (2015) ==
Toyota 86 Tomica Concept

Overview
- Manufacturer: Toyota
- Production: 2015

Body and chassis
- Body style: 2+2 coupé
- Platform: Toyota 86 XN6

The 86 Tomica Concept is a concept car revealed in 2015. Takara Tomy sells a scale model police car based on the Toyota 86 under their Tomica brand, even though the police do not actually use the 86. It was built by Toyota Technocraft on behalf of Tomica as a full-size version of the scale model. The interior is mostly stock, except for the addition of a roof light switch, swapping the two-tone seat covers for plain black covers and no digital radio. The exterior uses the same paint scheme and roof lights as real police cars but adds a small, red Tomica logo on the rear.

== UUV (2015) ==
Toyota UUV (2015)

Overview
- Manufacturer: Toyota
- Production: 2015

Body and chassis
- Platform: Toyota Tacoma

The UUV is a concept car revealed at the 2015 SEMA Show. It is a Toyota Tacoma platform with a Toyota Sienna body. UUV stands for Ultimate Utility Vehicle. It includes Wi-Fi, internet, satellite TV, Skype capability, and a night vision camera.

== Tacoma Back To The Future Concept (2015) ==
Toyota Tacoma Back To The Future Concept
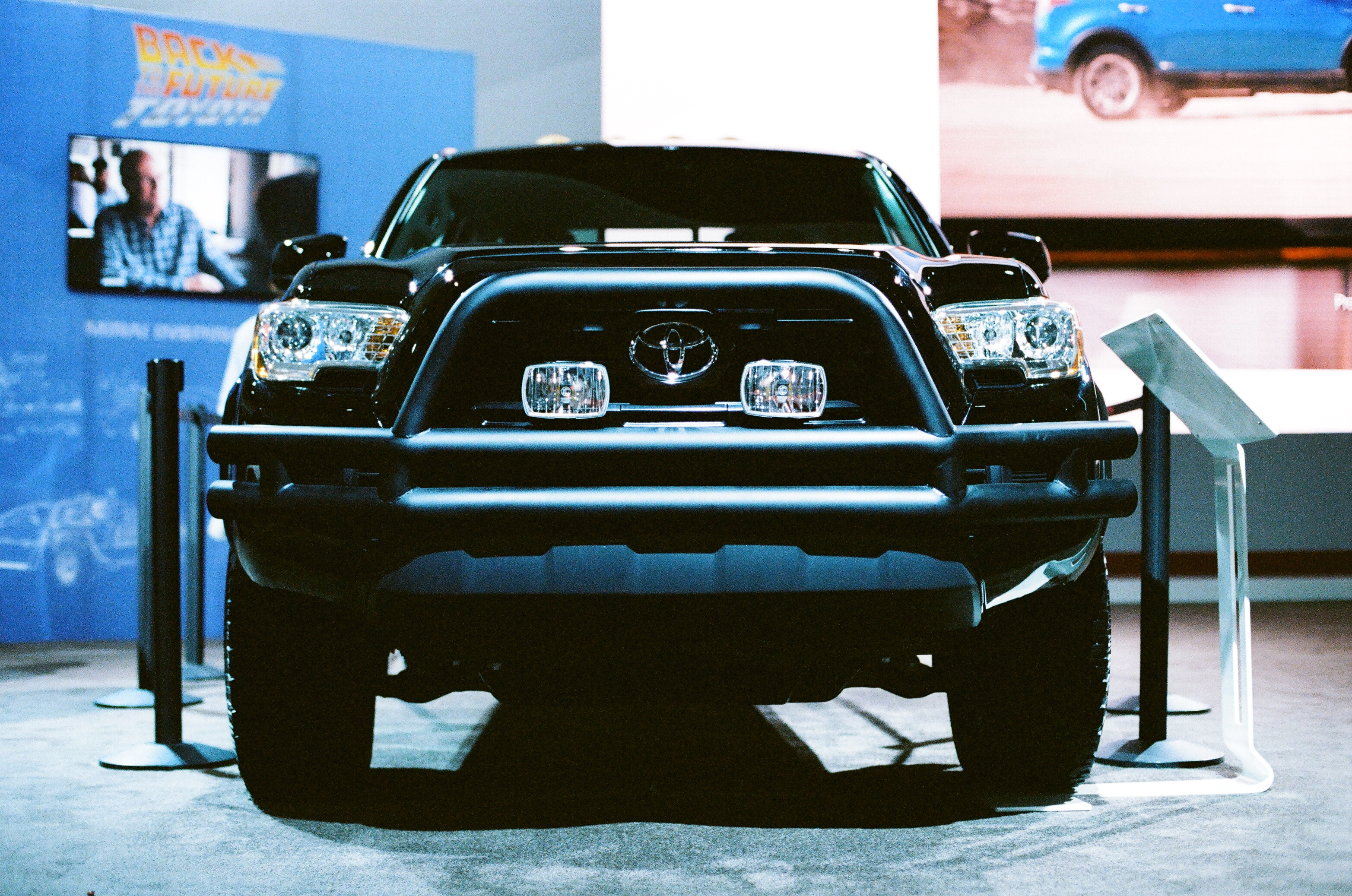

Overview
- Manufacturer: Toyota
- Production: 2015

Body and chassis
- Body style: 4-door pickup
- Layout: 4WD
- Platform: Toyota Tacoma
- Related: Toyota Tacoma

Powertrain
- Engine: 3.5-litre V6
- Transmission: six-speed manual

Dimensions
- Wheelbase: 3236 mm
- Length: 5392 mm
- Width: 1890 mm
- Height: 1793 mm

The Toyota Tacoma Back to the Future Concept is a pick-up truck made by Toyota in 2015. It has been shown at many auto shows in North America. The pick-up is based on the one showed in Back to the Future Part II, the second film in the franchise. The Tacoma is decked out with tubular bumpers, a roll bar, KC off-road lights, a black paint job, and a throwback TOYOTA graphic on the tailgate. With a V6 engine, the truck can go 185 km/h (115 mph), with 207 kW (278 hp) at 6,000 rpm and 359 N⋅m (265 ft⋅lb) at 4,600 rpm. It has a towing capacity of 2,948 kg (6,499 lb).

== Camatte Hajime (2015) ==
Toyota Camatte Hajime
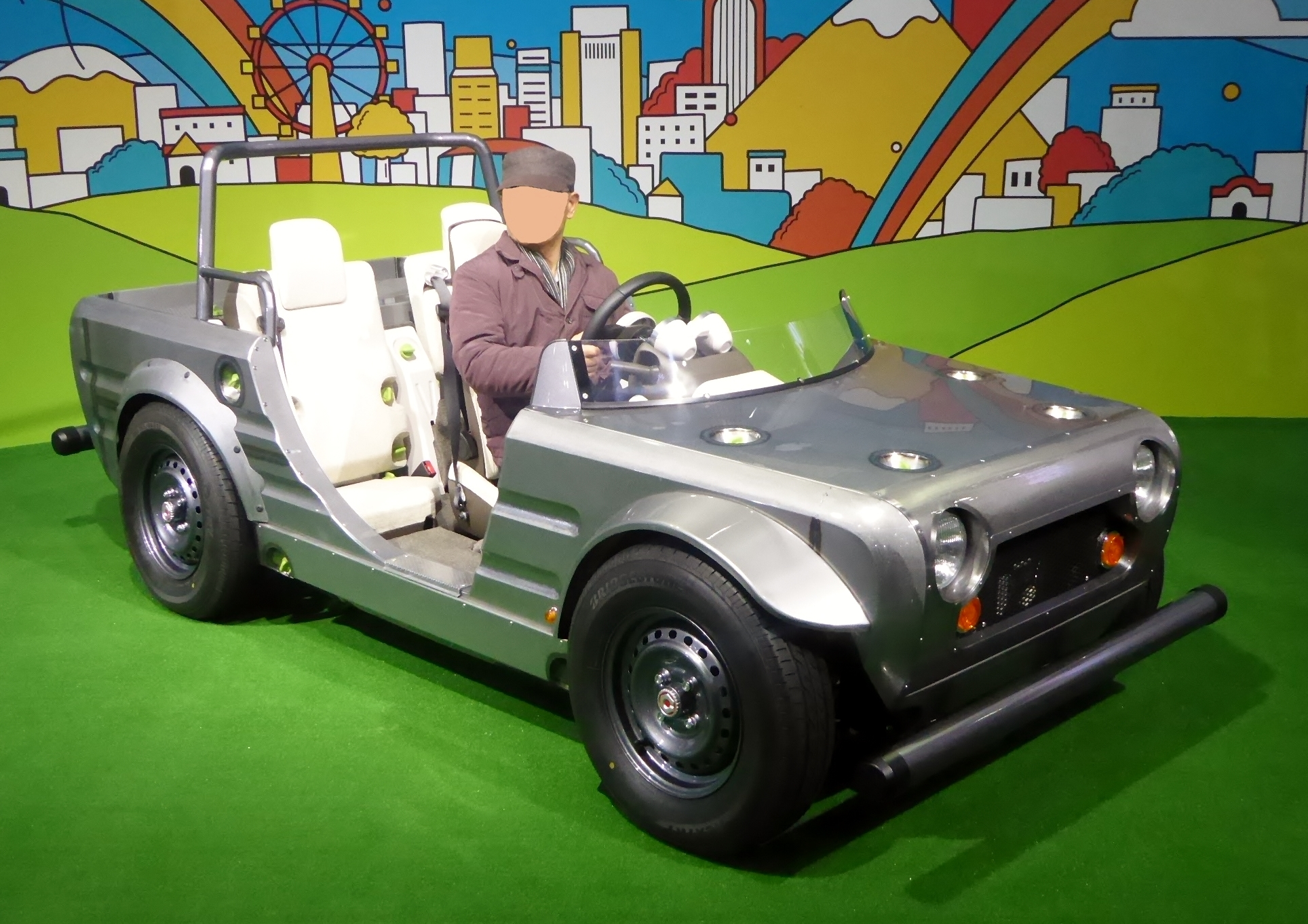
- Camatte Hajime

Overview
- Manufacturer: Toyota
- Production: 2015

Body and chassis
- Body style: 2-door roadster

Powertrain
- Engine: 48V electric motor

Dimensions
- Wheelbase: 1,800 mm (71 in)
- Length: 3,020 mm (119 in)
- Width: 1,320 mm (52 in)
- Height: 1,240 mm (49 in)

Chronology
- Predecessor: Toyota Camatte57s Sport LED
- Successor: Toyota Camatte SetSuna

The Toyota Camatte Hajime was unveiled at the June 2015 Tokyo Toy Show as an updated body for the Toyota Camatte electric chassis. The body is similar to a 1940 style Jeep. "Hajime" means "beginning" in Japanese.

A virtual reality version was also made with virtual bodies for an ambulances, fire truck, police car and hot dog stall. Children could design their vehicle and then drive it around a virtual reality track.

== FCV Plus (2015) ==
Toyota FCV Plus
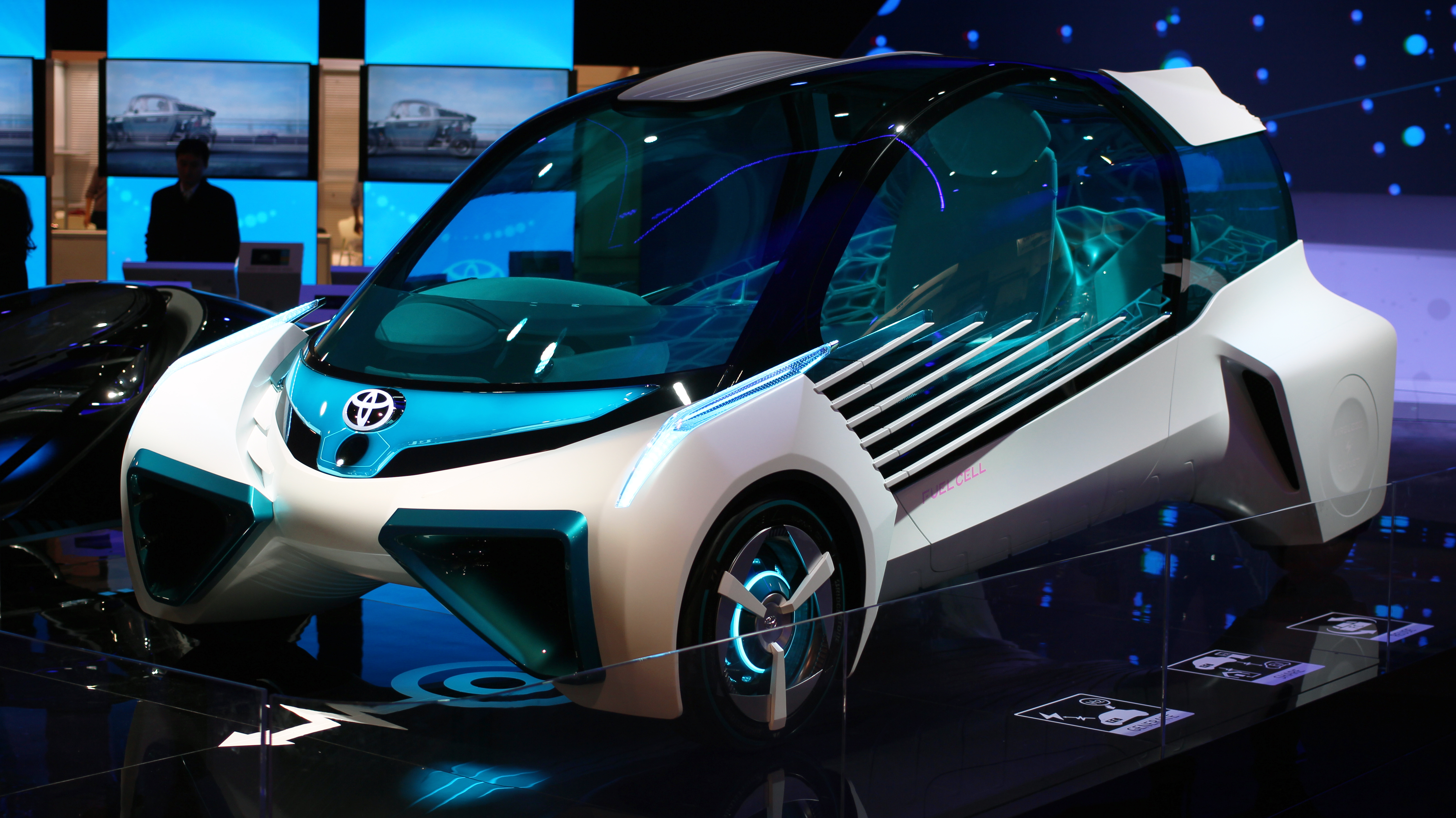

Overview
- Manufacturer: Toyota
- Production: 2015

Body and chassis
- Body style: 2-door sedan
- Layout: all-wheel drive

Dimensions
- Length: 3,800 mm (149.6 in)
- Width: 1,750 mm (68.9 in)
- Height: 1,540 mm (60.6 in)

The Toyota FCV Plus Concept is a concept car unveiled at the October 2015 Tokyo Motor Show using fuel cells to power electric motors in each wheel.

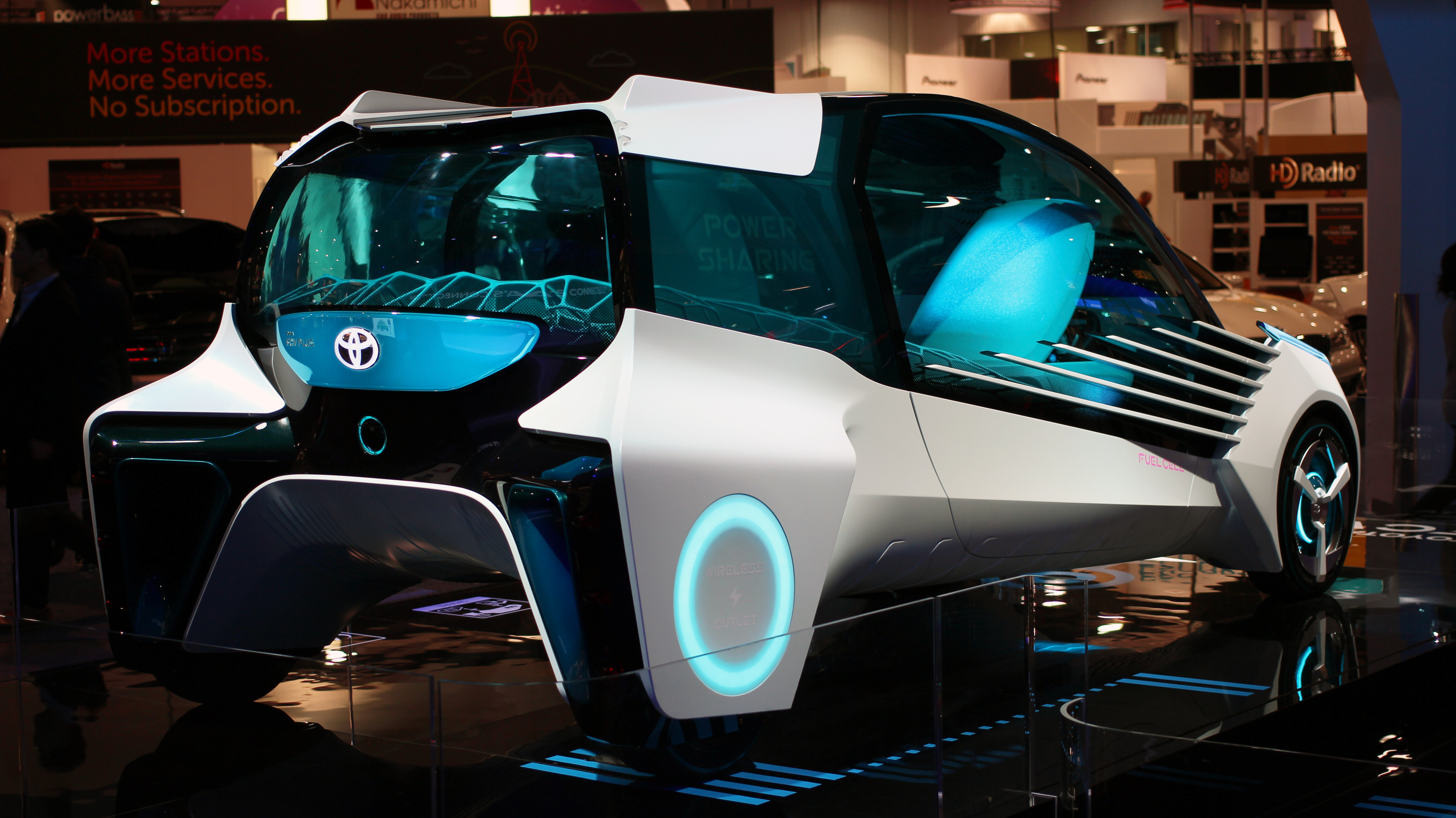
Rear view

== S-FR (2015) ==
Toyota S-FR
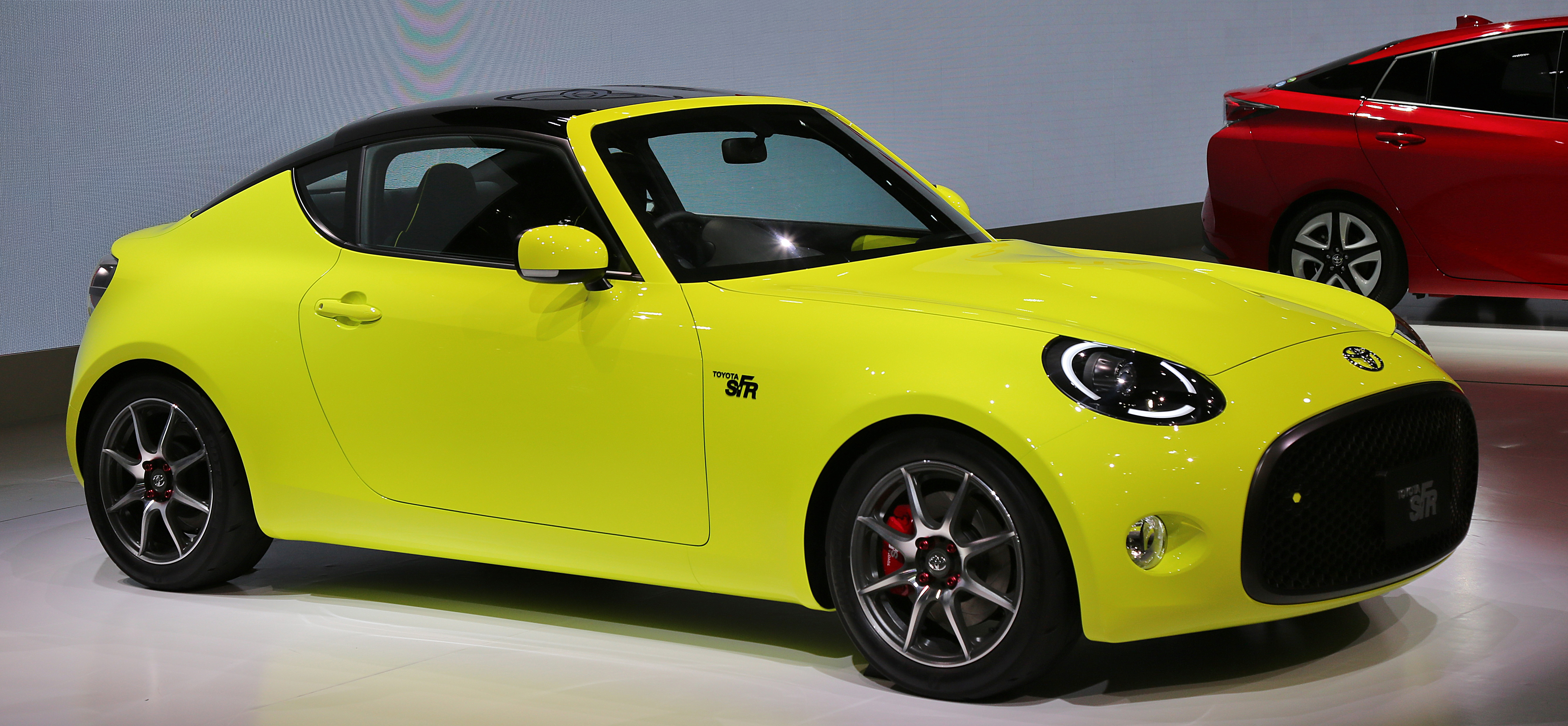

Overview
- Manufacturer: Toyota
- Production: 2015

Body and chassis
- Class: Sports car
- Body style: 2-door roadster
- Layout: Front-engine, rear-wheel-drive

Powertrain
- Engine: 1.5L 2NR-FKE I4 (130 PS)
- Transmission: 6-Speed Manual

Dimensions
- Wheelbase: 2,480 mm (97.6 in)
- Length: 3,990 mm (157.1 in)
- Width: 1,695 mm (66.7 in)
- Height: 1,320 mm (52.0 in)

The Toyota S-FR Concept is a concept car unveiled at the October 2015 Tokyo Motor Show as an entry-level sports car. The design of the S-FR was inspired by the Toyota Sports 800.

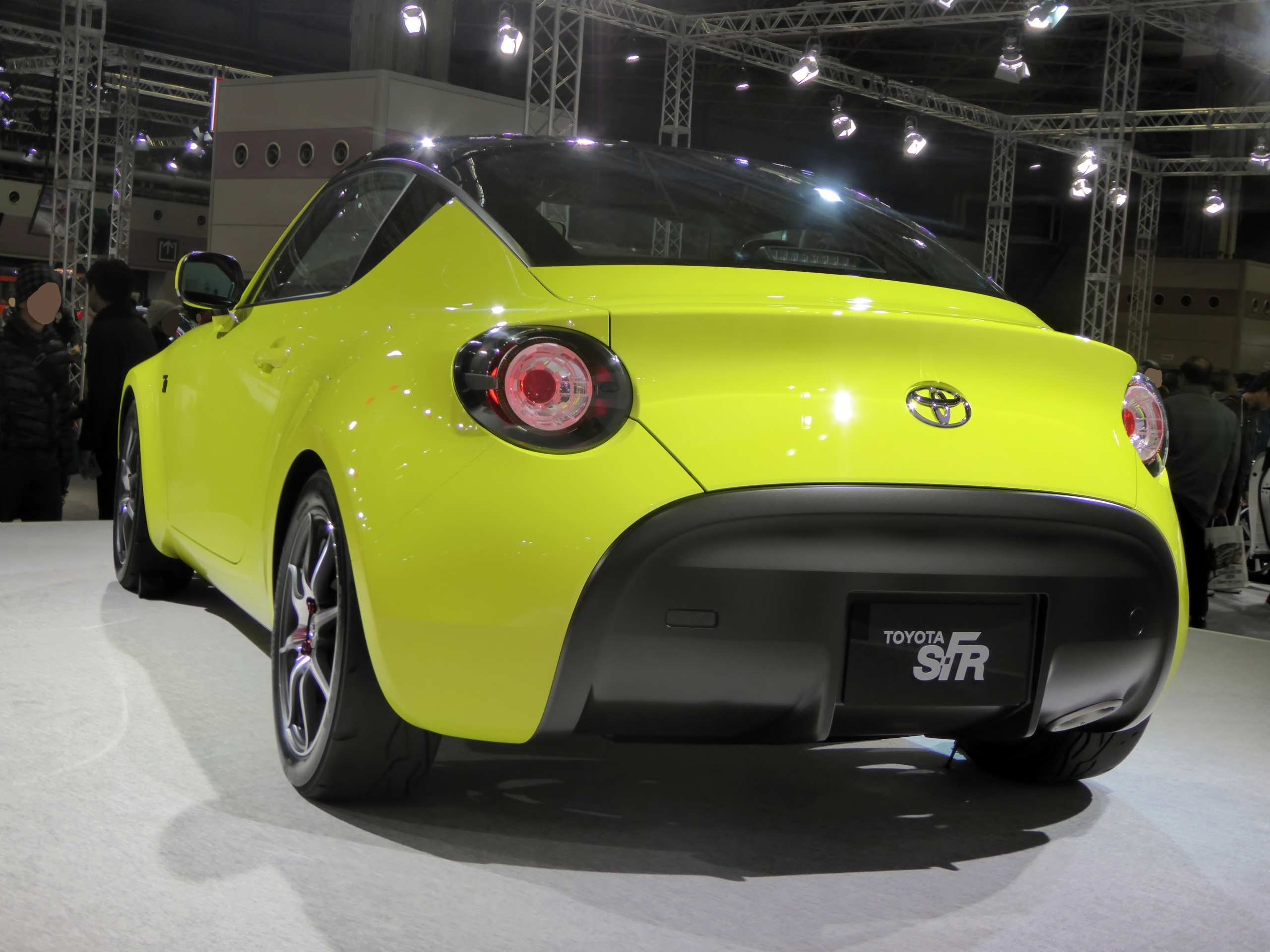
Rear view

== Kikai Concept (2015) ==
Toyota Kikai Concept
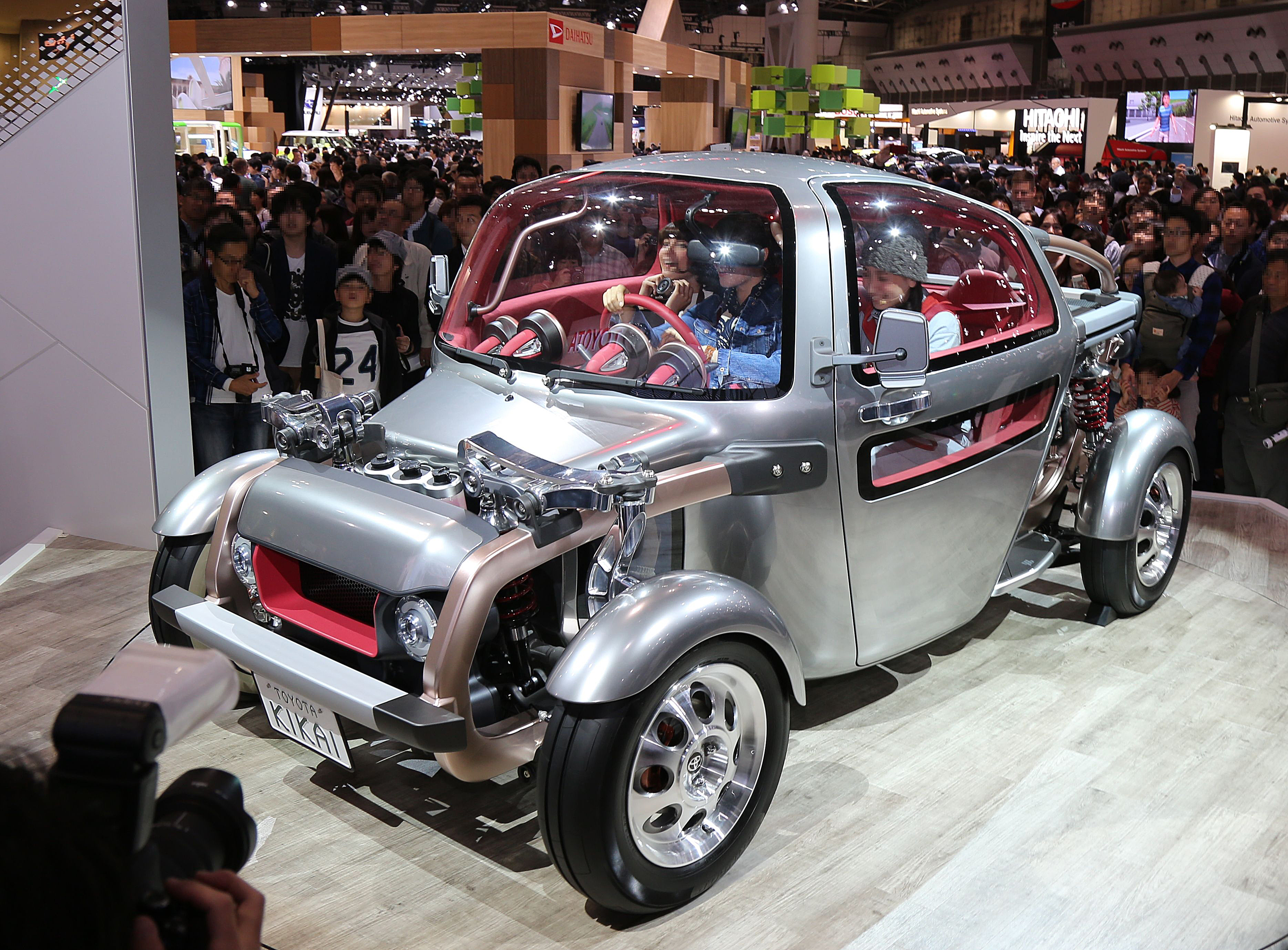

Overview
- Manufacturer: Toyota
- Production: 2015

Body and chassis
- Body style: 2-door sedan

The Toyota Kikai Concept is a concept car unveiled at the October 2015 Tokyo Motor Show in the style of a hot rod with exposed parts.

== uBox (2015) ==
Toyota uBox

Overview
- Manufacturer: Toyota
- Production: 2015

Body and chassis
- Body style: 5-door hatchback

The Toyota uBox is a concept vehicle built by Toyota in collaboration with Clemson University as part of the university's Deep Orange project.

== Yaris Legian (2015) ==
Toyota Yaris Legian
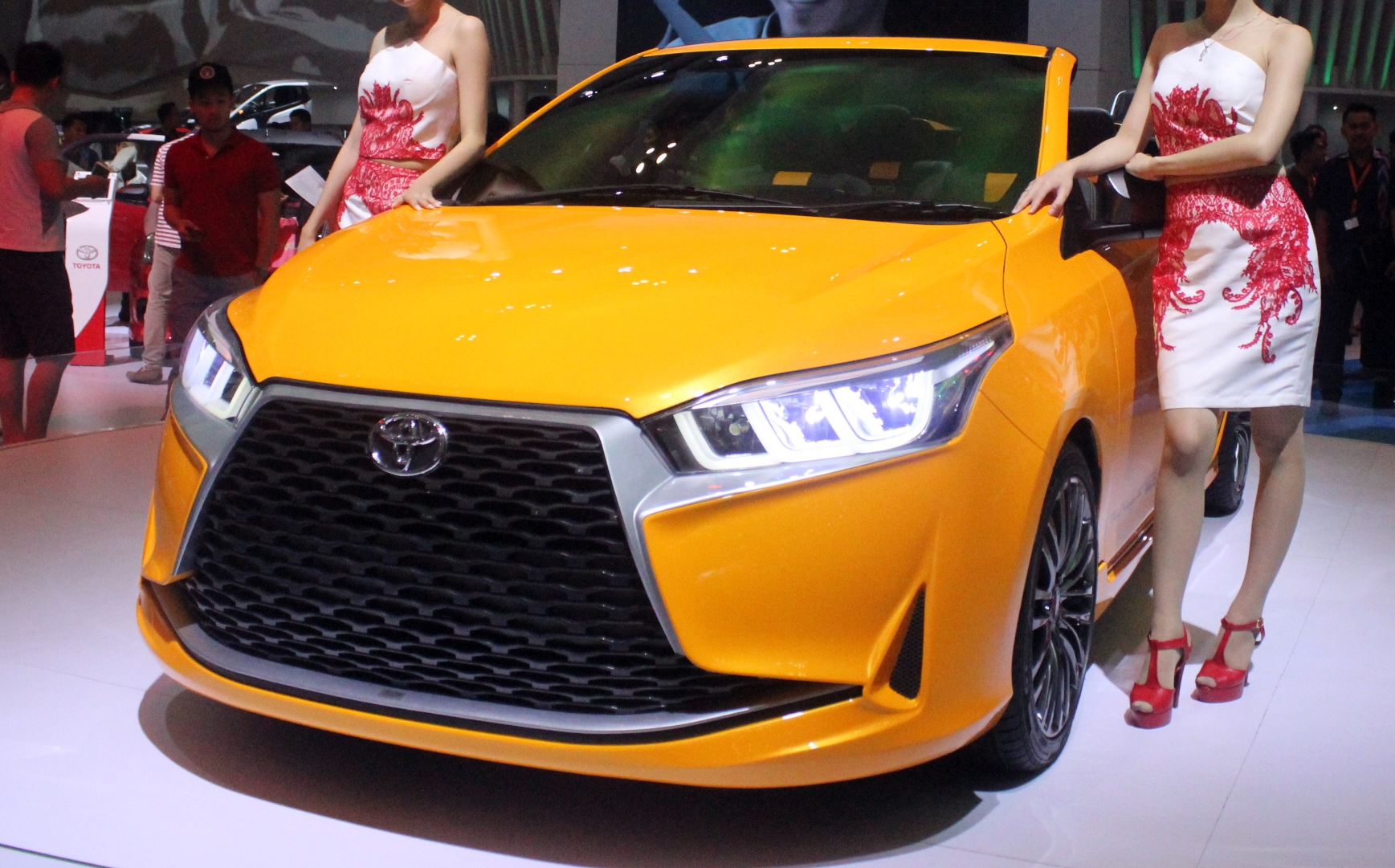

Overview
- Manufacturer: Toyota
- Production: 2015

Body and chassis
- Body style: 2-door convertible
- Related: Toyota Yaris (XP150)

The Toyota Yaris Legian is a concept vehicle built by Toyota based on the XP150 Yaris. It was shown at the August 2015 Gaikindo Indonesia International Auto Show.

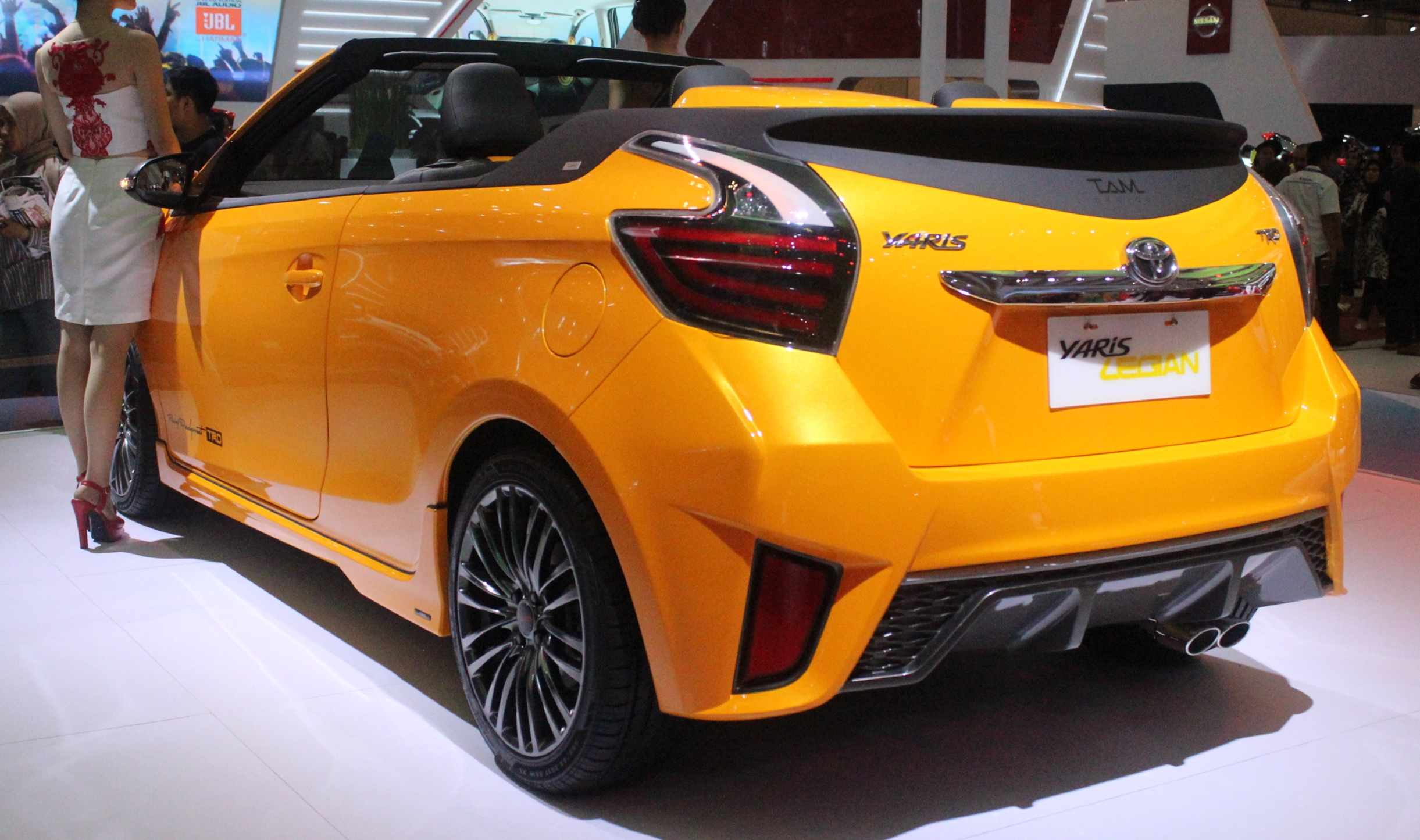
Rear view

== XTREME Corolla (2016) ==
Toyota XTREME Corolla

Overview
- Manufacturer: Toyota
- Production: 2016
- Designer: Jeremy Lookofsky

Body and chassis
- Body style: 2-door coupe

Powertrain
- Engine: 1.8L 2ZR-FE (132 hp (98 kW)) I4
- Transmission: 6-speed manual

Chronology
- Predecessor: Toyota Corolla

The XTREME Corolla is a concept car shown at the 2016 SEMA. It was made for the Corolla's 50th anniversary.

== Camatte Setsuna (2016) ==
Toyota Camatte Setsuna

Overview
- Manufacturer: Toyota
- Production: 2016

Body and chassis
- Body style: 2-door roadster

Powertrain
- Engine: 48V electric motor

Dimensions
- Wheelbase: 1,800 mm (71 in)
- Length: 3,020 mm (119 in)
- Width: 1,320 mm (52 in)
- Height: 1,240 mm (49 in)

Chronology
- Predecessor: Toyota Camatte Hajime

The Toyota Camatte Setsuna was unveiled at the April 2016 Milan Furniture Fair as a wooden roadster version of the Toyota Camatte electric chassis. The body has a similar shape to the Camatte57s but is made entire from Japanese cedar. The chassis is also similar to the Camatte57s but partially built using Japanese birch. The Camatte57s chassis provide 1+2 seating but the Setsuna is a more traditional 2-seater. The body panels are attached using traditional Japanese okuriari and kusabi joints, which don't require nails and allow the panels to be removed and reattached.

== Extreme Sienna (2016) ==
Toyota Extreme Sienna

Overview
- Manufacturer: Toyota, Real Time Automotive
- Production: 2016

Body and chassis
- Related: Toyota Sienna (XL30)

The Toyota Extreme Sienna is a heavily modified version of the third generation Sienna, based on the SE trim. It was made by Rick Leos of Real Time Automotive in collaboration with Toyota. On the exterior, the Extreme Sienna features: a custom 4-stage process candy blue paint job, a custom wide-body fully fabricated body kit, a custom anodized grille, tinted windows, anodized badges, LED foglamps, and a custom roof rack. For its suspension and brakes, it features: a custom lowered air lift performance system, Megan coil-over shocks, Stop Tech callipers, and a TRD big brake kit. Its wheels and tyres consist of Litespeed Racing two-piece forged concave wheels in a brushed-gold finish, 21x10 front, 21x10.5 rear, and wears Toyo Tires 255/30/21 front, 295/25/21 rear. Inside the minivan, it features: Euro Autolux leather (parchment as the main colour and cognac as the accent colour), reclining luxury heated chairs with built-in massage, Brazilian Pecan natural hardwood floors for the rear, an LED illuminated headliner panel, and embossed floor mats. It is equipped with the following technology: a 32" flat-screen smart TV, a JBL 5.1 home theatre system, built-in iPad controller, Apple TV, Apple-integrated Wi-Fi router, an inverter, and converter, and a custom 8-speaker audio system designed by JBL. Its 4-seater configuration and rear passenger setup appears to have been inspired by the Royal Lounge version of the Toyota Alphard, with the wood floors being unique to the Extreme Sienna. It was showcased at the 2016 SEMA show.

== Land Speed Cruiser (2016) ==
Toyota Land Speed Cruiser

Overview
- Manufacturer: Toyota
- Production: 2016

Body and chassis
- Body style: 5-door SUV

Powertrain
- Engine: 5.7 L twin turbo V8

The Toyota Land Speed Cruiser was unveiled at the November 2016 SEMA Show. Based on a J200 series Land Cruiser, the frame and suspension were modified to lower it substantially for added stability at high speed. The 5.7 litre 3UR-FE had two Garrett turbochargers (one per bank) added, along with unspecified internal modifications, to make a claimed 1,500 kW (2,000 hp). With a mild body kit, including front and rear spoilers and a flat under body, Toyota claims the top speed will be 355 km/h (220 mph).

== Prius G (2016) ==
Toyota Prius G

Overview
- Manufacturer: Toyota
- Production: 2016

Body and chassis
- Body style: 5-door sedan

Powertrain
- Engine: 1.8-litre 2ZR-FXE inline-4 with 73 kW (99 PS) and 142 Nm of torque.

Chronology
- Predecessor: Toyota Prius GT300

The Toyota Prius G is a hybrid Toyota Prius upgraded as a race car. It was shown at the 2016 Specialty Equipment Market Association (SEMA) Show. It is based on the Prius GT300. It was tested on the Willow Springs International Raceway and performed 0.99 g on the skid pad.

== Toyota-28 (2016) ==
The Toyota-28 is a luxury fibreglass boat, made in partnership with Yanmar. Shown at the March 2016 Japan International Boat Show, it entered production as the Ponam-28V. It featured a composite hull made from fibreglass, with supporting aluminium and carbon fibre stringers.

== Toyota 86 Shooting Brake (2016) ==
Toyota 86 Shooting Brake
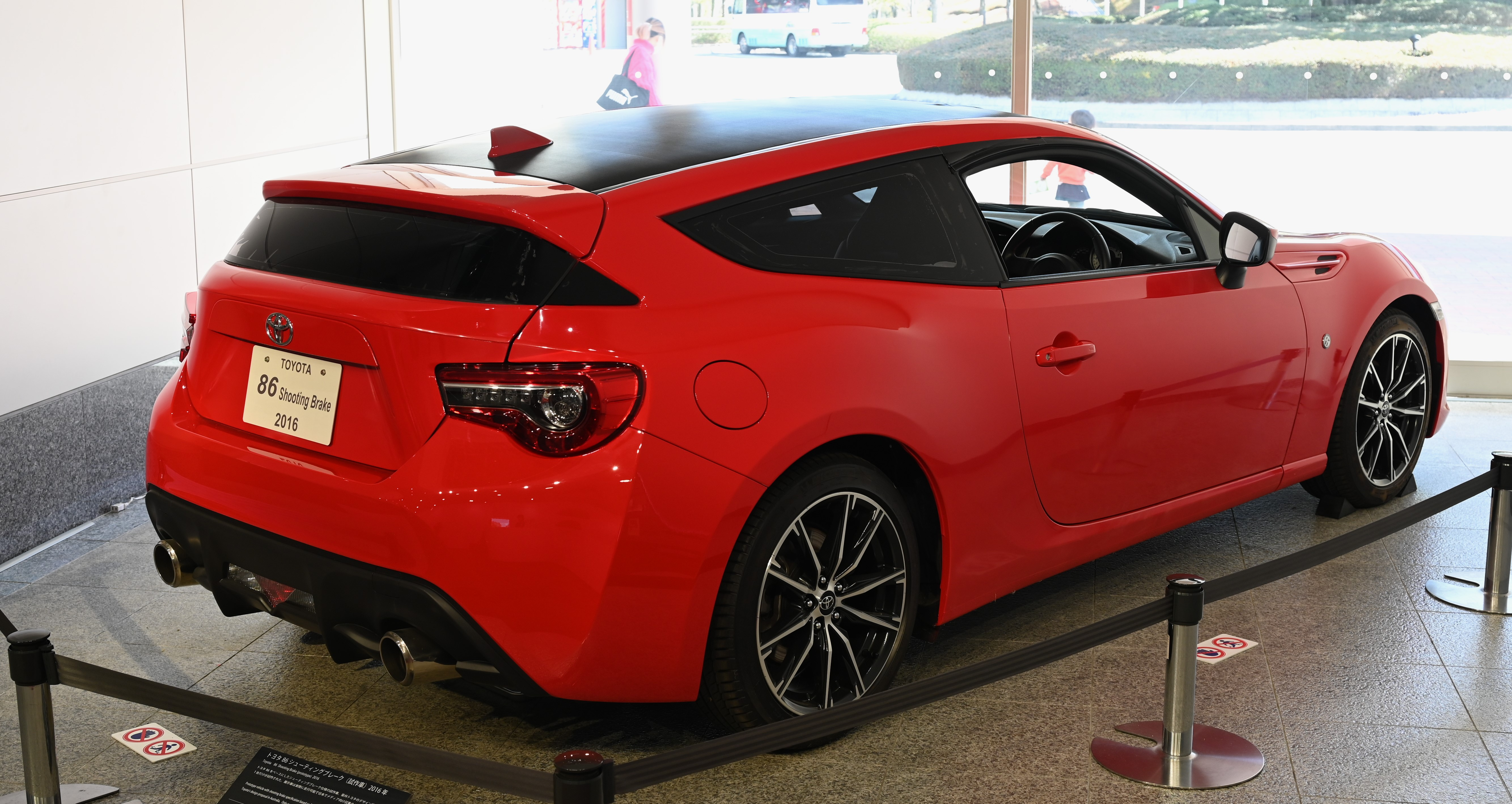

Overview
- Manufacturer: Toyota
- Production: 2016

Body and chassis
- Related: Toyota 86

The 86 Shooting Brake is a sports Hatchback made by Toyota in 2016. Subaru also made a similar looking BRZ variant.

== S-FR Racing Concept (2016) ==
Toyota S-FR Racing Concept
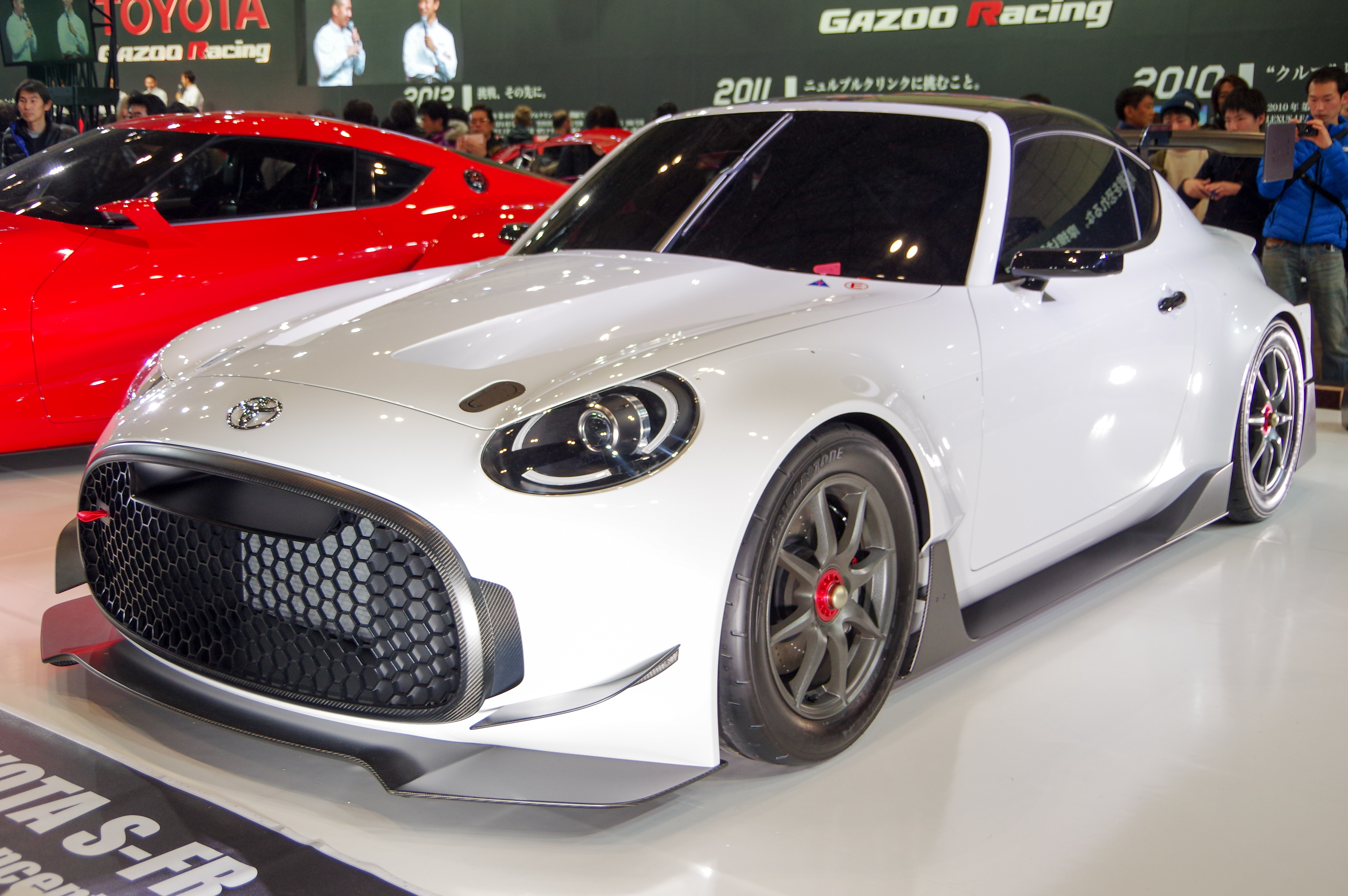

Overview
- Manufacturer: Toyota
- Production: 2016

Body and chassis
- Body style: 2+2 coupe
- Related: Toyota S-FR

Powertrain
- Engine: 1.5-litre four-pot four-cylinder
- Transmission: 6-speed gearbox

Dimensions
- Curb weight: 980 kg (2,161 lb)

Chronology
- Predecessor: Toyota Sports 800

The Toyota S-FR Racing Concept was unveiled at the 2016 Tokyo Auto Salon. The S-FR Racing Concept will have carbon-fiber spoilers, center-lock wheels, and a vented hood. Both the splitter and the canards on the car are made from carbon-fiber-reinforced plastic (CFRP). The back of the car includes a massive diffuser, a center-mounted exhaust pipe, aerodynamic winglets on each side of the bumper, and a large wing. The sides were also revised for racing, now featuring aerodynamic side skirts, slender mirrors, and lightweight, black-painted wheels wrapped in racing rubber. The concept also switched from body-coloured to black door handles and had its fuel cap moved on the C-pillar. The interior features racing seats, plain door panels, and a flat-bottom steering wheel. It has an output of 75–112 kW (100–150 hp).

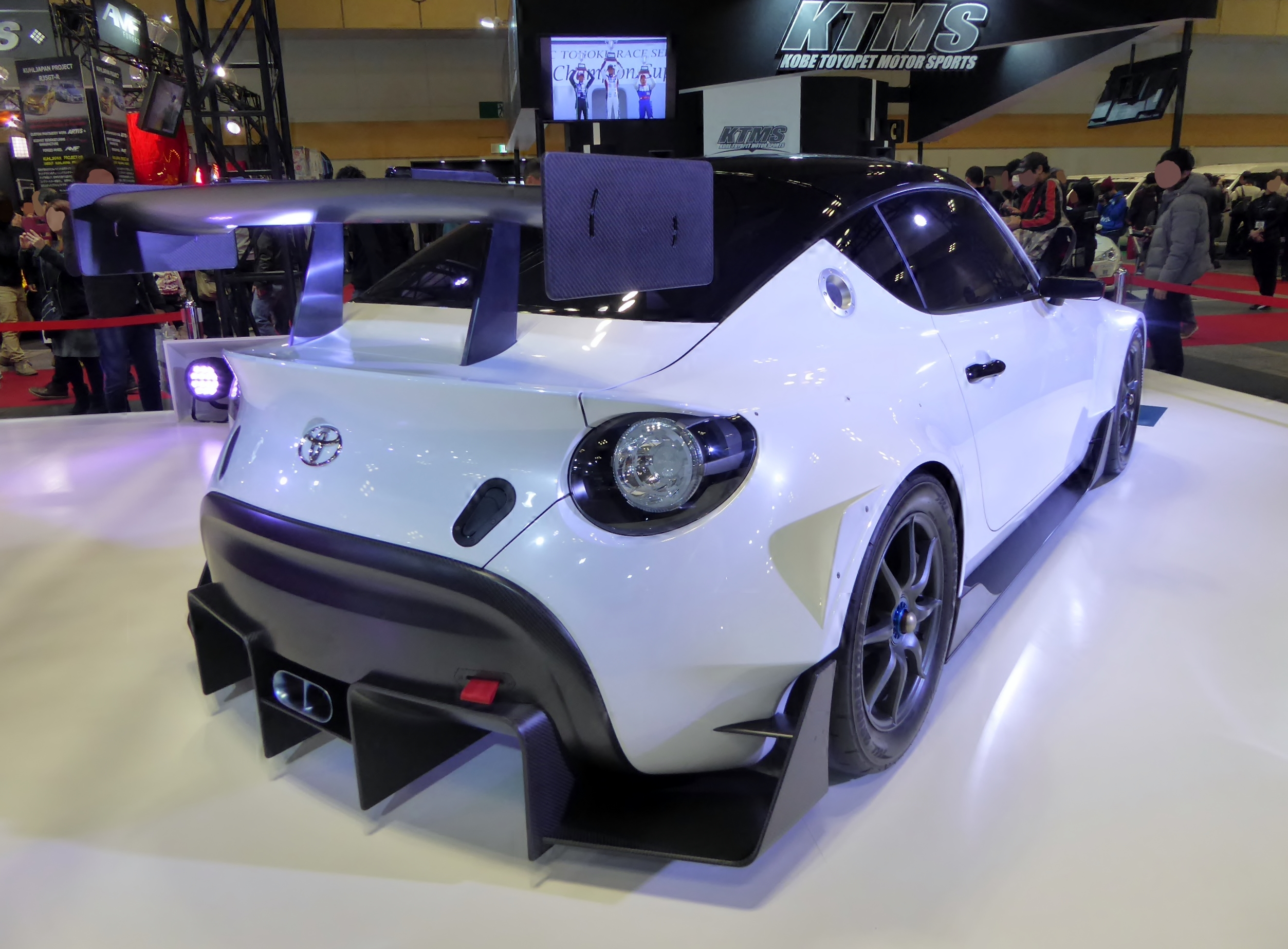
Rear view

== Setsuna (2016) ==
Toyota Setsuna

Overview
- Manufacturer: Toyota
- Production: 2016
- Designer: Kenji Tsuji

Body and chassis
- Body style: 2 door coupe

Powertrain
- Engine: electric motor, six 12-volt lead-acid starter batteries

Dimensions
- Wheelbase: 1,700 mm (66.9 in)
- Length: 3,048 mm (120.0 in)
- Width: 1,480 mm (58.3 in)
- Height: 970 mm (38.2 in)

Chronology
- Predecessor: Toyota Camatte

The Toyota Setsuna is a concept car made by Toyota in 2016, and shown at the Milan Design Week festival. It is based on the Toyota Camatte. It is an open air, 97% cedar wood car. The car is planned to last up to the year 3000 before the wood is expected to be needed to replace. It has a top speed of 45 km/h (28 mph), and a range of 26 km (16 miles). It is not street-legal anywhere, but close to legal in Italy and Japan.

The special emblem on the cars hood shows a flower blooming, representing time evolving. The wood around the door mirrors, seats, steering wheel, and body banding lines have gotten a lacquer finish. The seats have been made to feel like a wooden park bench, but with leather. It also includes a "100 year meter", an always ticking timer counting the 100 years until the car will need a wood change.

Another main material is aluminum. Aluminum was used to make wheel caps, the steering wheel, and the seat frames, to bring some contrast to the car.

The car also gives the feeling of a boat on the water, enhancing the family-vacation vibe. The car can seat 2 people. Kenji Tsuji, the designer, said, "When we created the Setsuna, we envisaged a family pouring its love into it over generations so that the car gains an irreplaceable value. Continuous development is possible in the form of bonds between the car and the family, like the growth rings of a tree. To proceed with the development of a car utilizing the appeal of wood, we directly spoke with experts with wide-ranging knowledge, including carpenters specializing in temple and shrine construction and ship's carpenters. Furthermore, during this project, Sumitomo Forestry, a company that fully understands our concept, shared their knowledge of wood construction with us, and together we engaged in various types of joint development from the early stages, including wood selection and proposals for processing techniques and assembly methods. While we used wood as the main material, we also poured lots of time and passion into the car itself with our colleagues, creating a prototype and evaluating it so that the car would offer basic performance in the form of driving feel and comfort. By displaying the Setsuna, which was created with these hopes in mind and receiving a wide range of opinions, we believe that we can further improve this concept. One piece of feedback that we received in particular was the hope that we would incorporate this concept into car manufacturing in the future."

At the festival, Toyota build an exhibit using the same wood as the car, where visitors walk through a wooden "tunnel". A large neon sign saying Setsuna greets visitors as they approach the exhibit.

== HiLux Tonka Concept (2017) ==
HiLux Tonka Concept

Overview
- Manufacturer: Toyota Australia
- Production: March 2017

Body and chassis
- Body style: 4WD 4-door double cab pickup truck

The HiLux Tonka Concept was a HiLux SR5 that was customised by Toyota Australia and shown in March 2017 to celebrate the 70th birthday of Tonka and the 80th birthday of Toyota. The yellow and black paint featured the Tonka logo in large letters.

The ride height was raised by 150 mm, with 17-inch wheels and 35-inch tyres. The bulged bonnet and the tailgate were made in carbon fibre. Roll-over bars and side bars were added.

== Fine-Comfort Ride Concept (2017) ==
Fine-Comfort Ride Concept
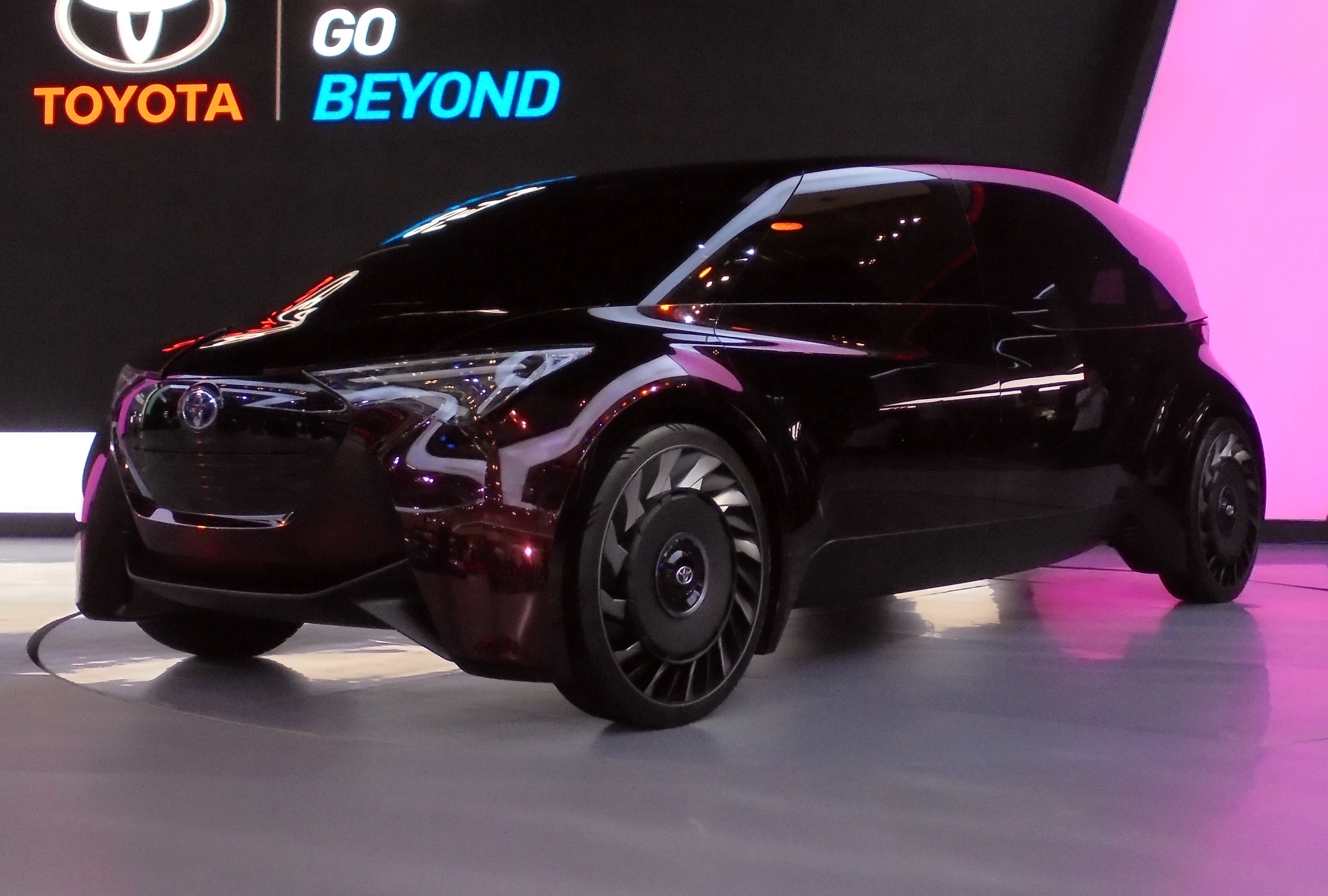
- Fine-Comfort Ride Concept at the 2018 Geneva Motor Show

Overview
- Manufacturer: Toyota
- Production: 2017

Body and chassis
- Body style: 4-door minivan

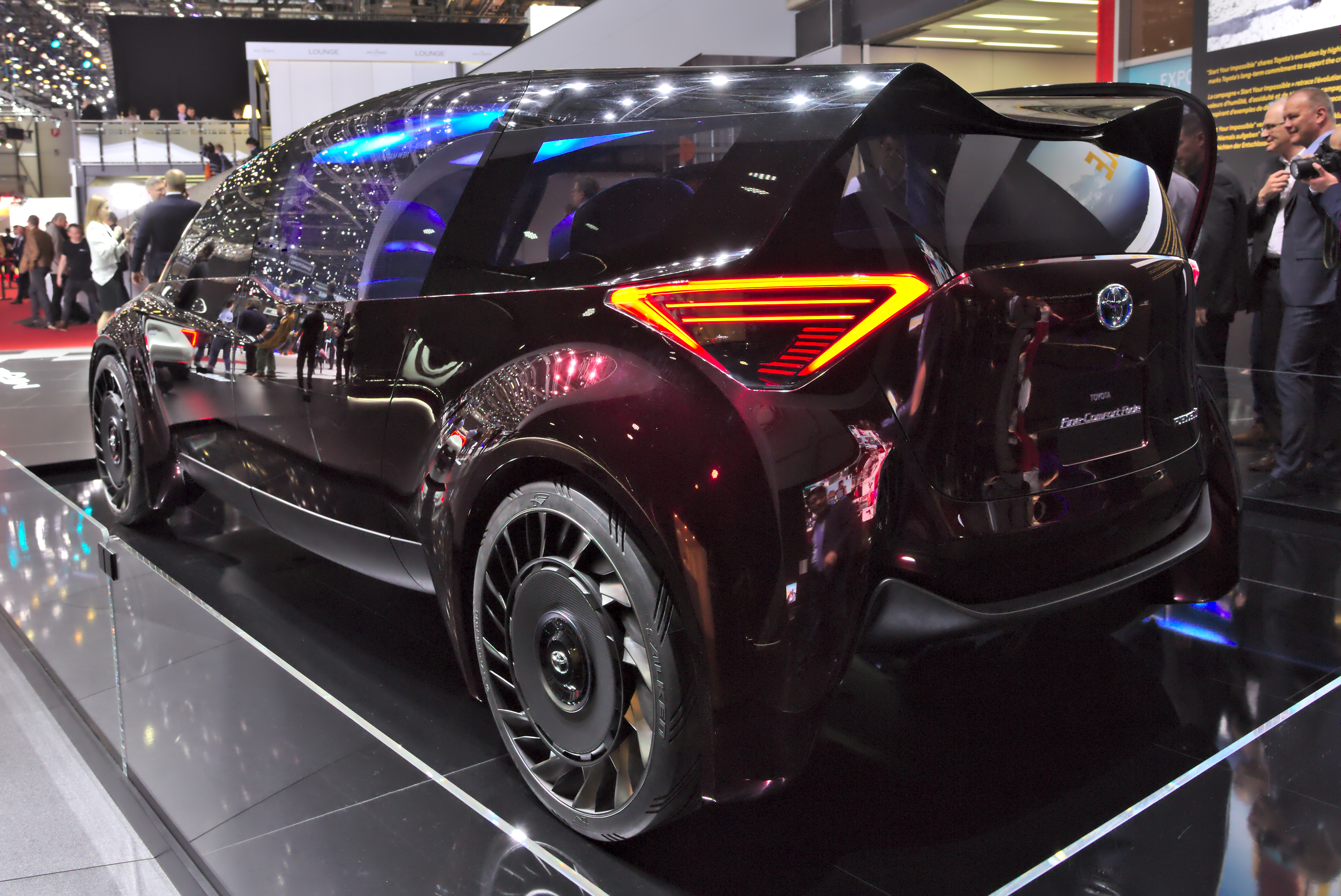
Rear view

== Concept-愛i (2017) ==
Toyota Concept-愛i
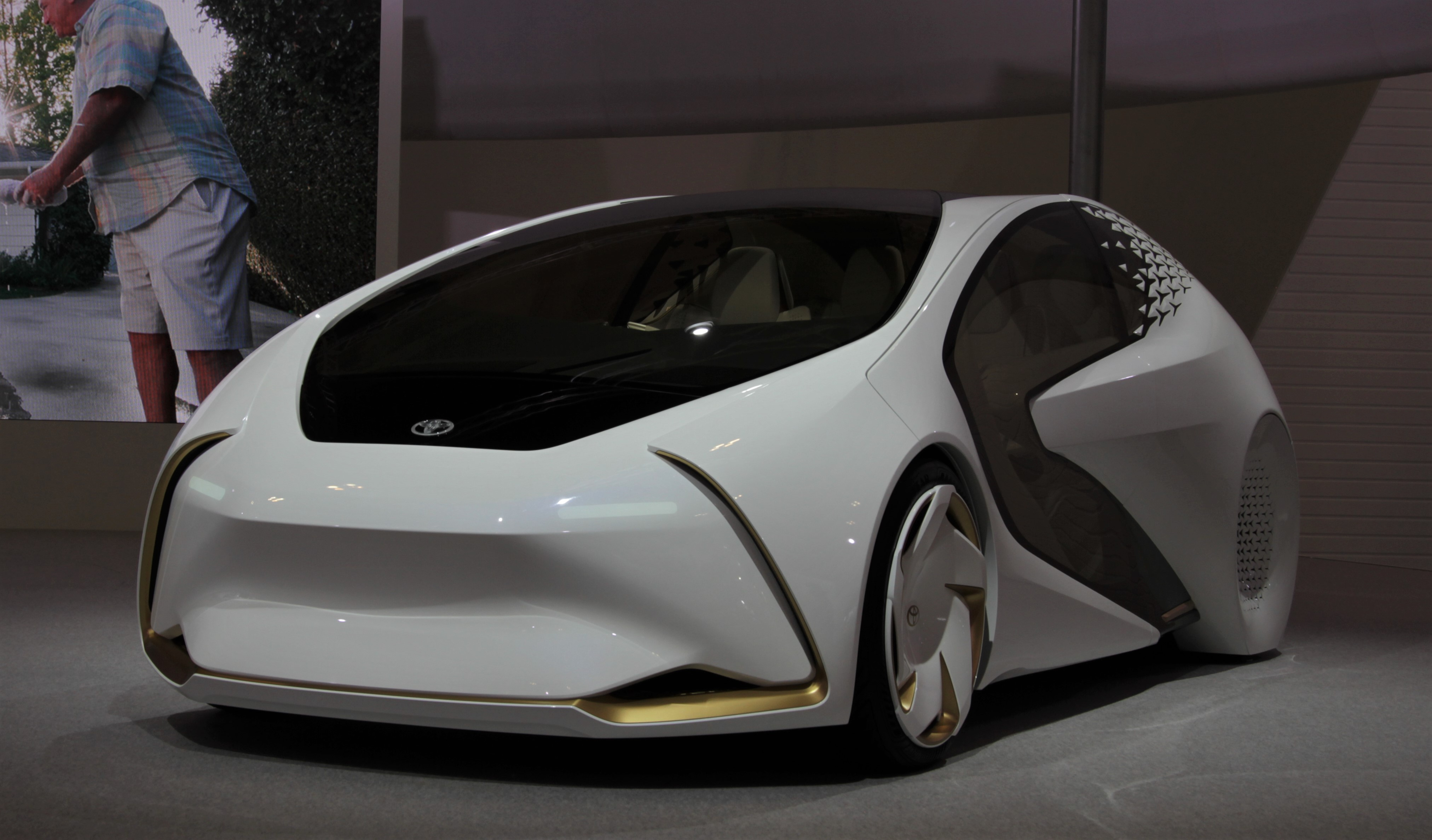
- Toyota Concept-愛i at the 2018 Geneva Motor Show

Overview
- Manufacturer: Toyota
- Also called: Toyota LQ Concept
- Production: 2017

Body and chassis
- Body style: 4-door minivan
- Doors: Scissor doors (front); Suicide scissor doors (rear)

Dimensions
- Wheelbase: 2,700 mm (106.3 in)
- Length: 4,510 mm (177.6 in)
- Width: 1,830 mm (72.0 in)
- Height: 1,475 mm (58.1 in)

The Toyota Concept-i first came out in 2017, at the Tokyo Motor Show. It includes 2 personalized robots that allow the car to communicate through lights, self-drive, and sense the drivers feelings.

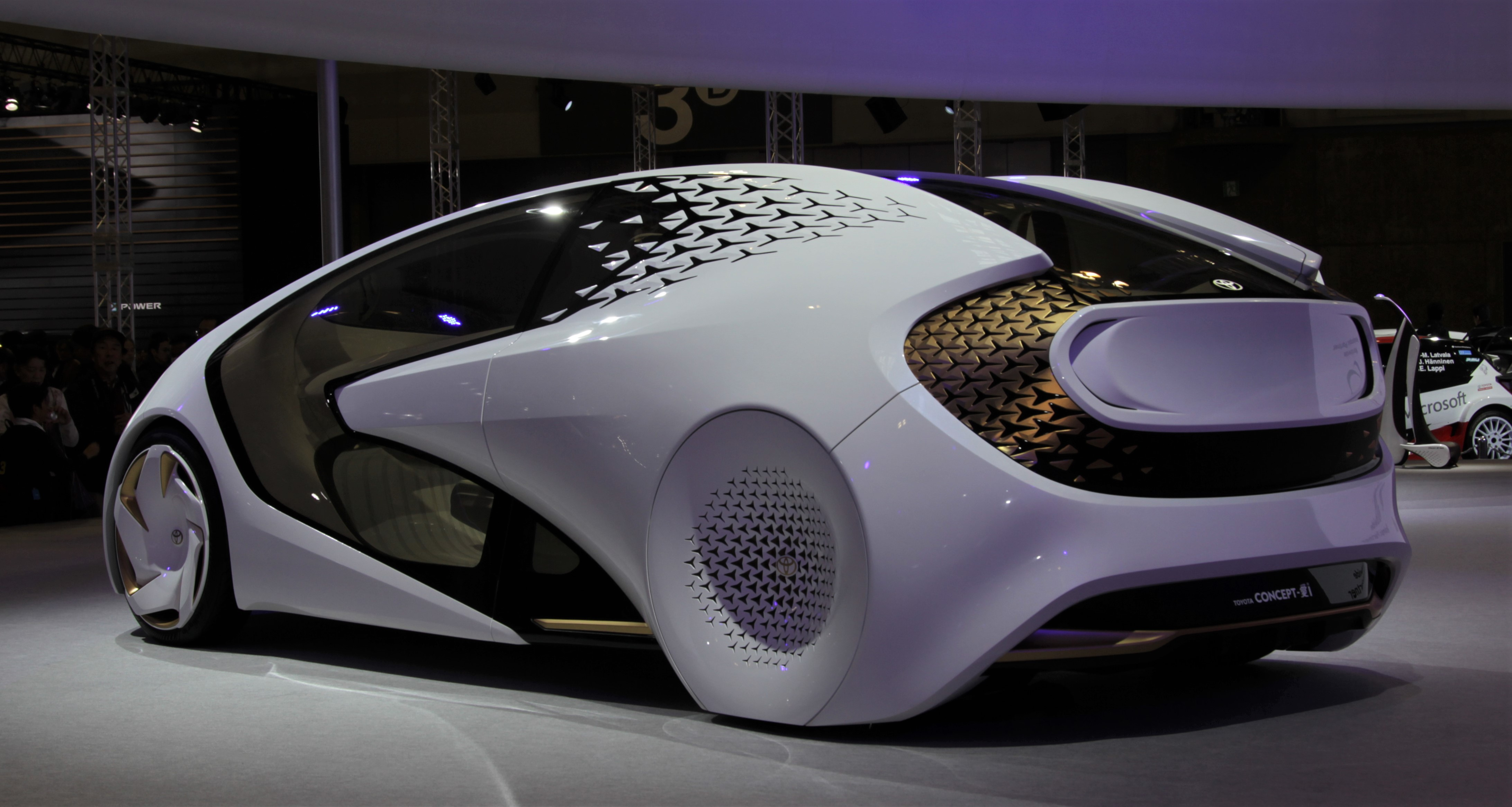
Rear view

== Concept-愛i Ride (2017) ==
Toyota Concept-愛i
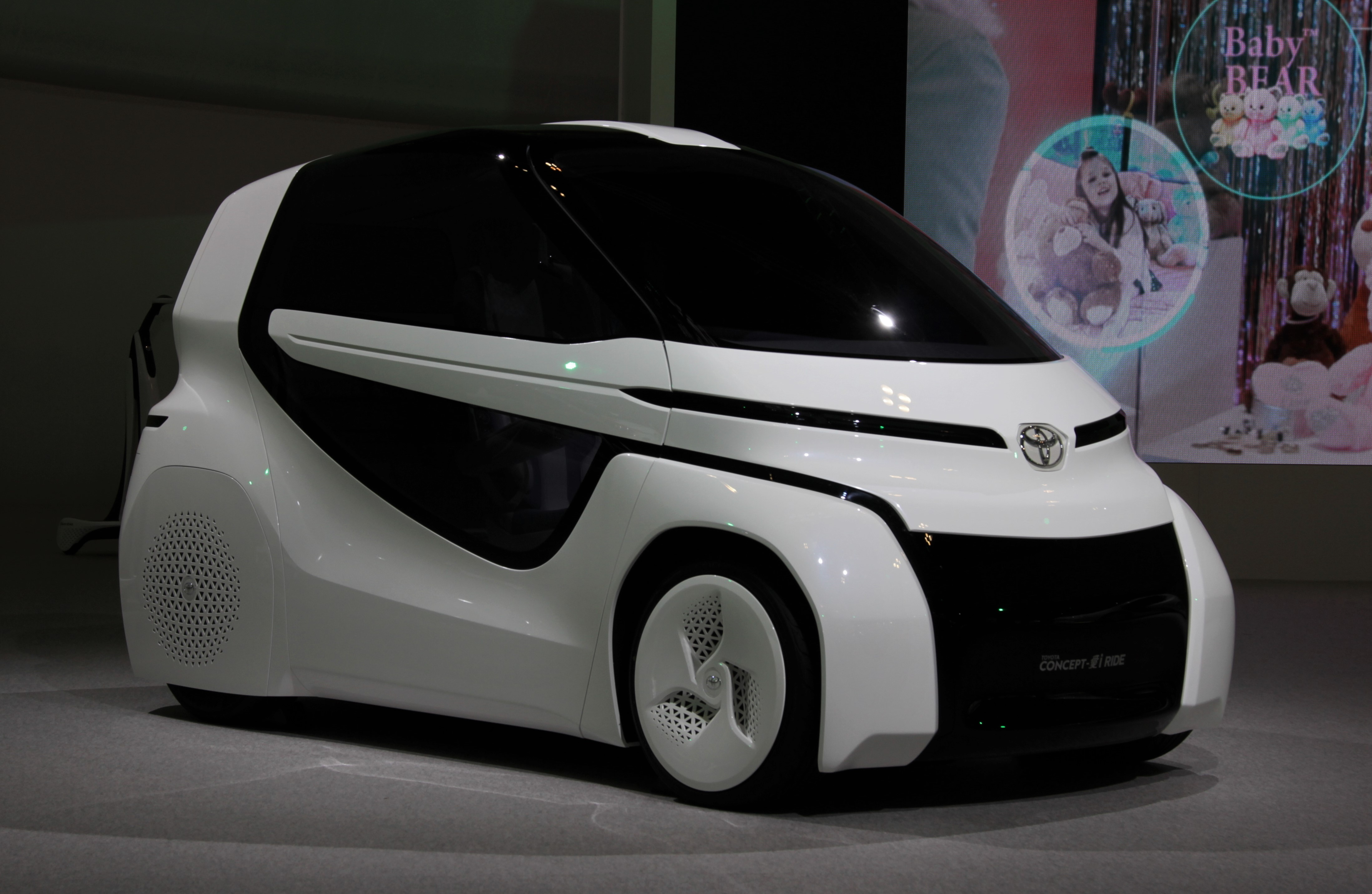
- Toyota Concept-愛i Ride at the 2018 Geneva Motor Show

Overview
- Manufacturer: Toyota
- Production: 2017

Body and chassis
- Body style: 2-door microvehicle
- Doors: Gull-wing doors

Toyota created the Concept-i Ride also in 2017. It is a mini-city car that allows people with wheelchairs to drive the car. The back can open, allowing wheelchairs inside the car.

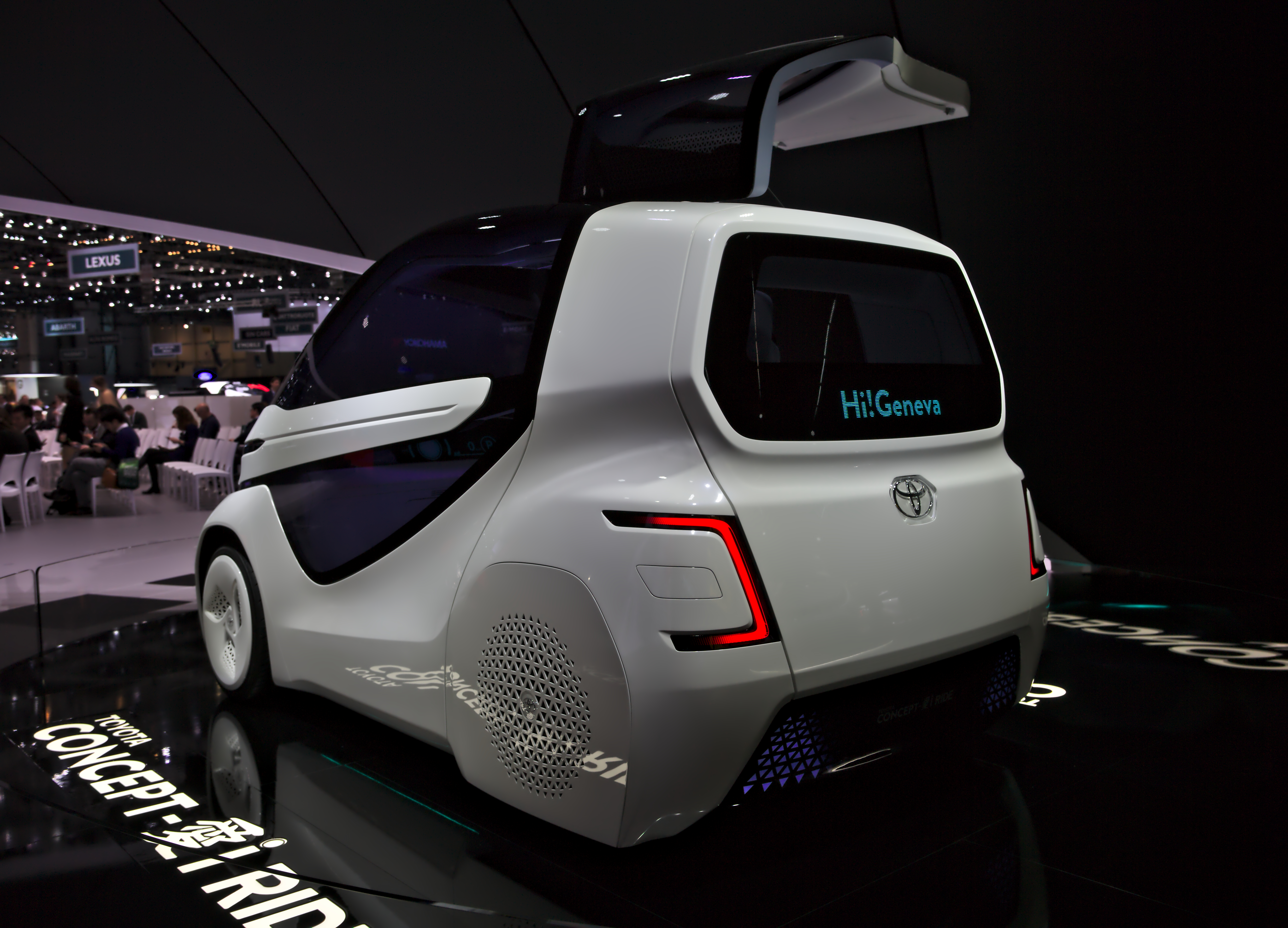
Rear view

== Concept-愛i Walk (2017) ==
The Concept-i Walk is a mini-electric scooter for the use of pedestrians in crowded cities. Toyota wanted the concept to hit big in cities like New York City, Chicago, and Tokyo.

== FT-AC (2017) ==
Toyota FT-AC
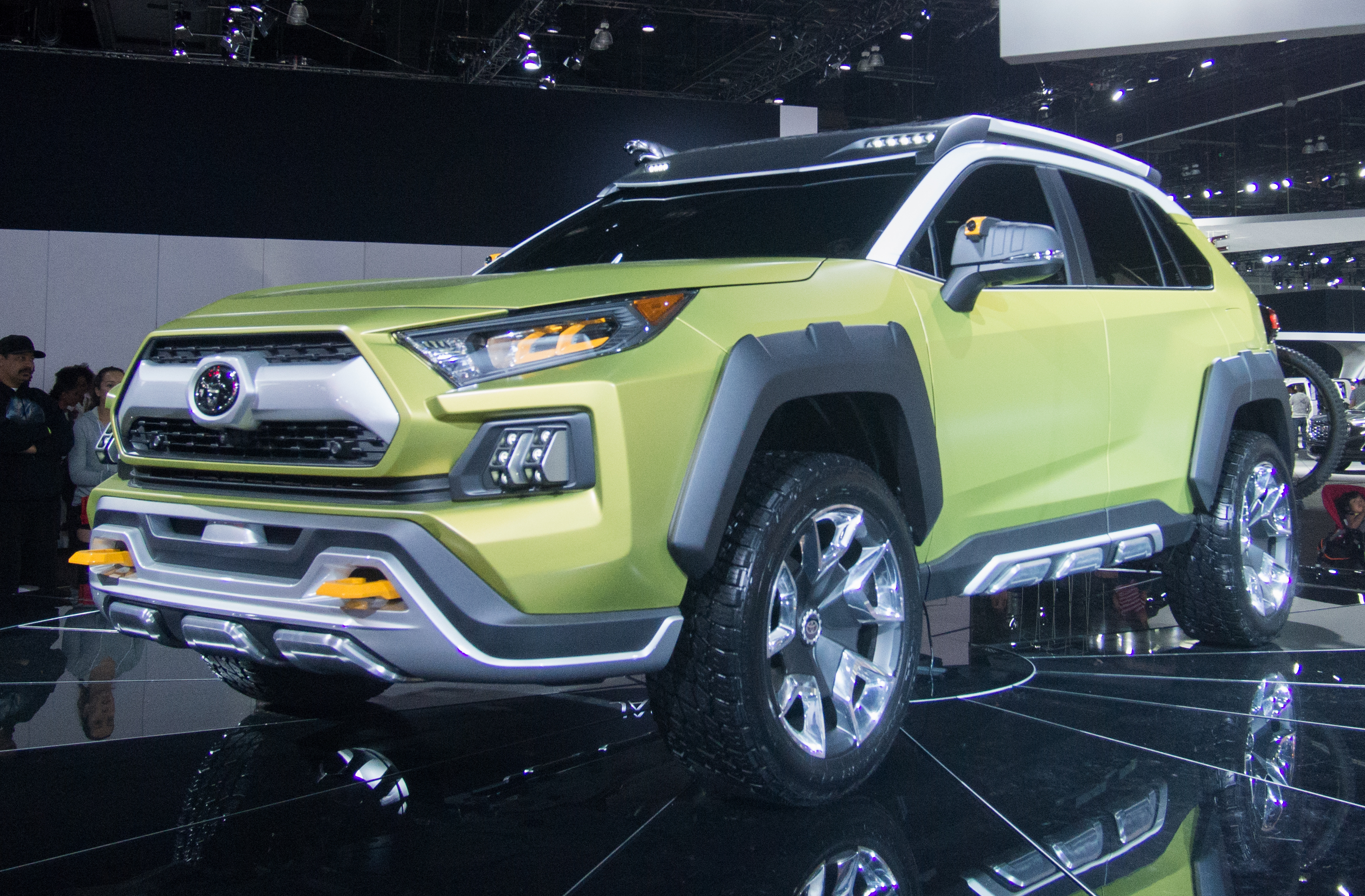

Overview
- Manufacturer: Toyota
- Production: 2017

The Toyota FT-AC (Future Toyota Adventure Concept) is a concept car unveiled at the December 2017 Los Angeles Auto Show. The vehicle is similar in size and form to the RAV4 but with bolder styling. Infrared cameras are mounted in the side mirrors and LED's in the roof rack can be used as a flash. Audience feedback at the show was strong enough that Jack Hollis of Toyota USA said there was a strong chance of the FT-AC going into production in a similar manner to the FJ Cruiser. The design was later adapted to fifth generation RAV4.

== Fun (2017) ==
The Toyota Fun or Fengchao Fun is a concept car introduced at the 2017 Shanghai Motor Show. The sedan previews the 2018 Camry. The car uses sharply slanted LED headlights, similar to the Mirai's. Toyota increased the windshield's rake and lowered the roof. The ultra-skinny LED taillights are an attractive evolution of the parts on the Fun. It uses the TGNA platform, which is acknowledged as "the backbone of Toyota’s future global range." It uses a 3.5-litre V6 engine (or a 2.5-litre four-cylinder), but can also use a hybrid engine.

== Hilux Bruiser (2017) ==
Toyota Hilux Bruiser

Overview
- Manufacturer: Toyota, Arctic Trucks
- Production: 2017

Body and chassis
- Layout: Front-engine, four-wheel drive

The Toyota Hilux Bruiser is a concept car built by Arctic Trucks for Toyota Great Britain to resemble the Tamiya Bruiser remote control scale model car. The road-legal vehicle includes a high-lift suspension, 17-inch wheels and 305/80 R17 tyres. Details from the scale model kit include blue paint, "Hog Heaven" graphics, white tubular all-round bumpers, a radio mast and a replica on/off switch built by Robert Selway.

== i-TRIL (2017) ==
The Toyota i-TRIL is a concept car introduced by Toyota at the 2017 Geneva Auto Show. Designed for three people, the Toyota i-TRIL concept posits a new mode of transportation that is somewhere between a subcompact car and a motorcycle. A product of Toyota's European design studio in Nice, France, the i-TRIL is a podlike EV with a range of about 200 km (120 mi). At 2,830 mm (111.4 in) long, it is 135 mm (5.3 in) longer than a Smart Fortwo. The car's rear track is half the width of the front, and the rear wheels do the driving. The connection between the rear wheels and the body is hinged, allowing the body and the front wheels to lean into turns by up to 10 degrees—an idea Toyota calls Active Lean technology, which it previously explored in the Toyota i-Road concept. The two butterfly doors take a section of the floor with them when they open, allowing for easier access to the central front seat, which swivels. The i-TRIL has a steering yoke but no pedals, and a head-up display replaces a traditional gauge cluster.

== Tj Cruiser (2017) ==
Toyota Tj Cruiser
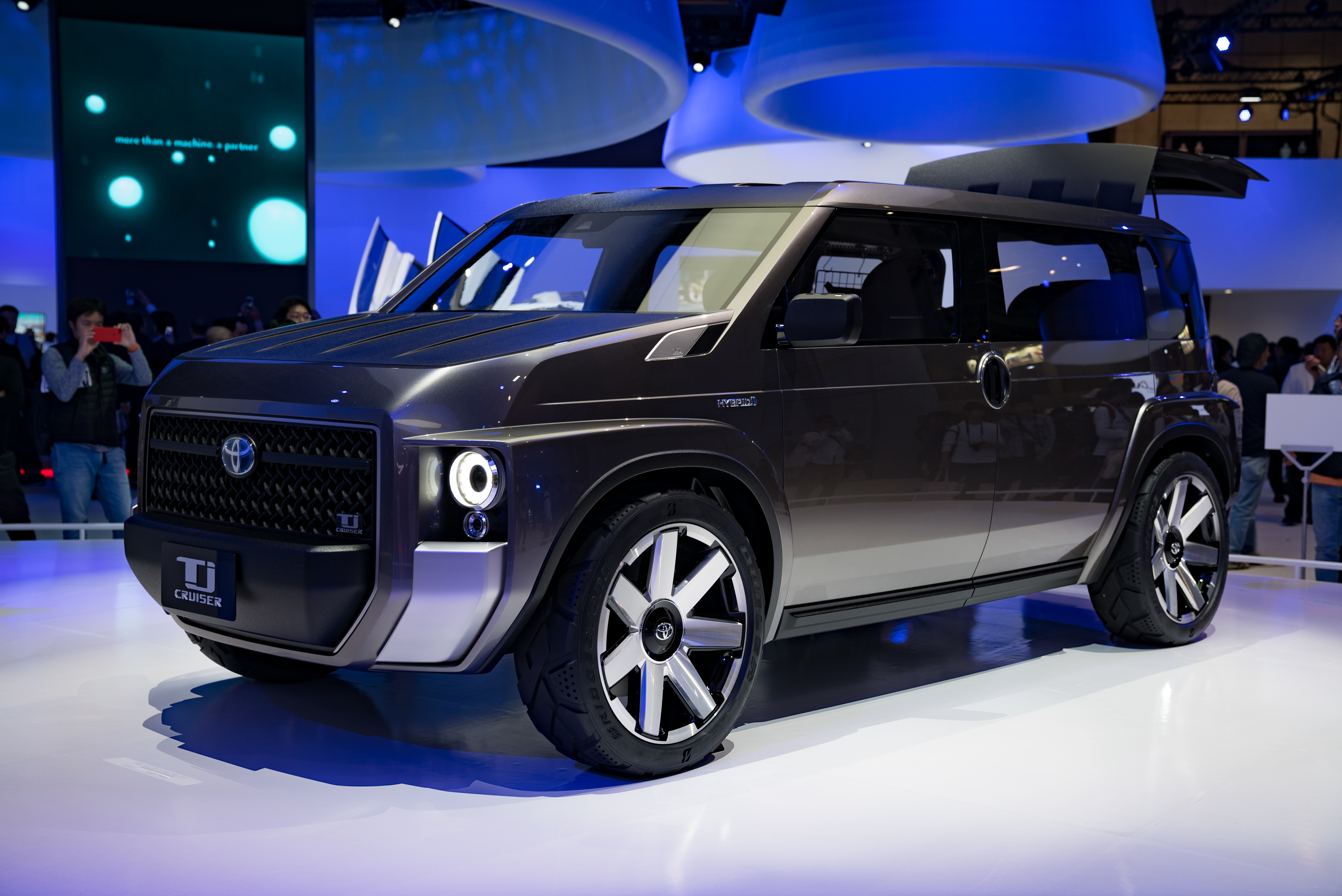

Overview
- Manufacturer: Toyota
- Production: 2017

Body and chassis
- Layout: Front-engine, four-wheel drive
- Platform: TNGA

Powertrain
- Engine: 2.0-litre engine (hybrid optional)

Dimensions
- Length: 4,300 mm (169.3 in)
- Width: 1,775 mm (69.9 in)
- Height: 1,620 mm (63.8 in)

The Toyota Tj Cruiser is a concept car built by Toyota and shown at the 2017 Tokyo Motor Show. It uses a monocoque chassis instead of a separate frame. The paint was specially designed to be non-slip and scratch proof. The three passenger seats can fold flat in order to hold more cargo. Production was expected to go ahead but as of September 2021, Toyota has made no further announcements.

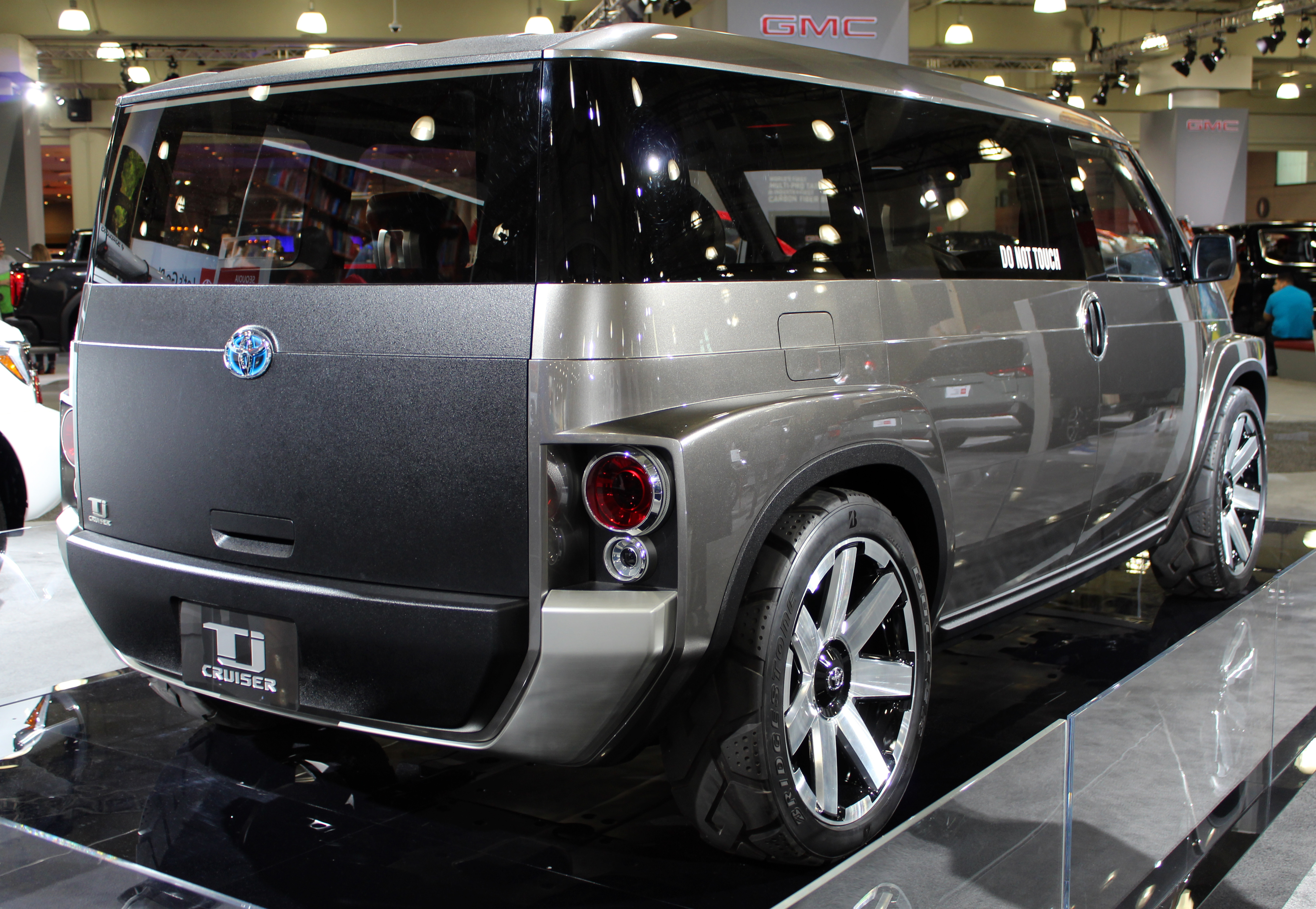
Rear view

== Camatte Petta (2017) ==
The Toyota Camatte Petta is a remake of the Toyota Camatte, but is now equipped with a roadster body. It was introduced at the 2017 Tokyo Toy Show. its predecessor is the Toyota Camatte Takumi.

== GR HV Sports Concept (2017) ==
Toyota GR HV Sports Concept
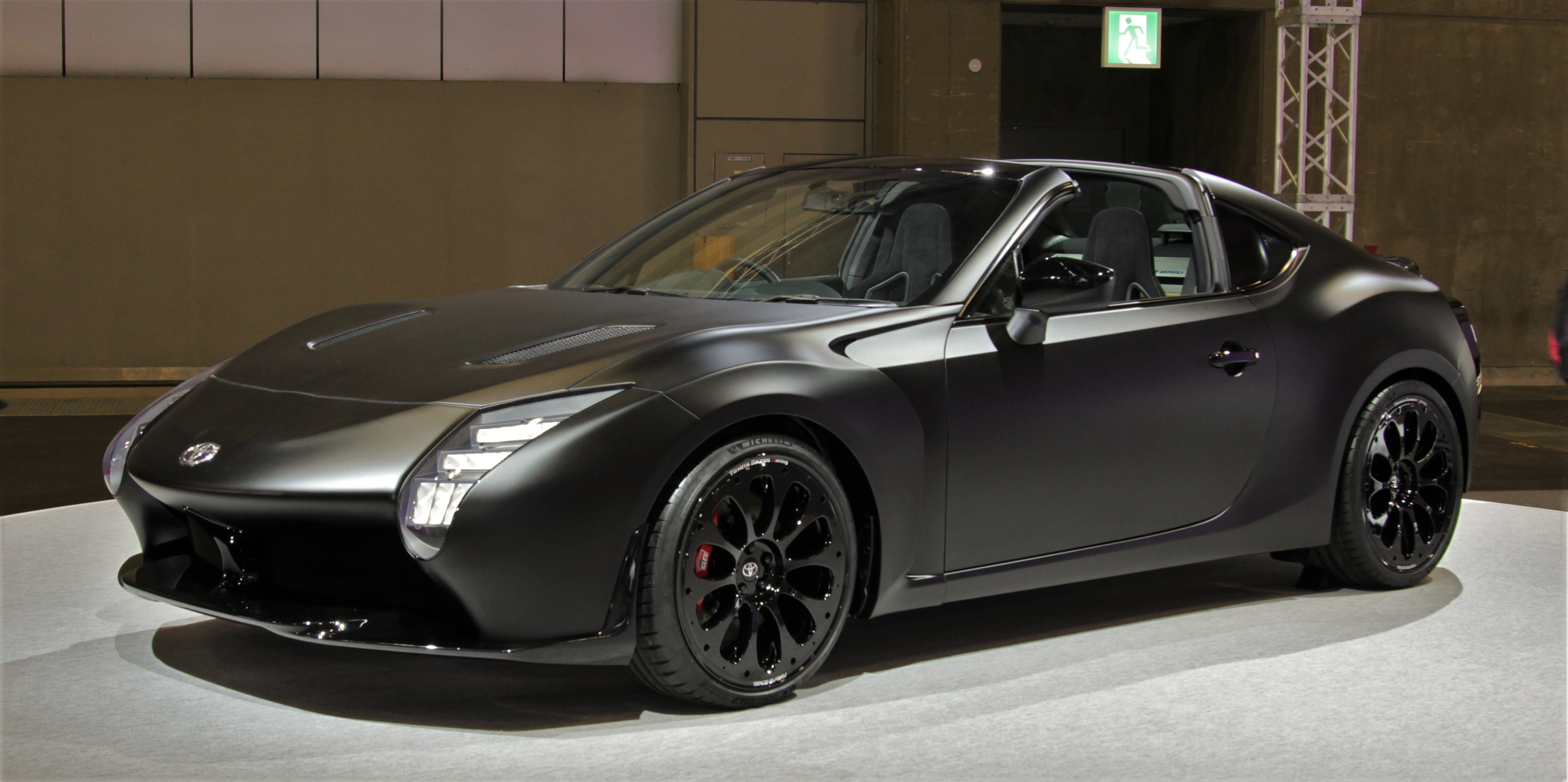

Overview
- Production: 2017

The GR HV Sports Concept is made by Toyota in 2017, based on the 86. It features a targa-top, LMP1-inspired headlights and taillights, and a gas-electric hybrid drivetrain with a mid-mounted battery pack.

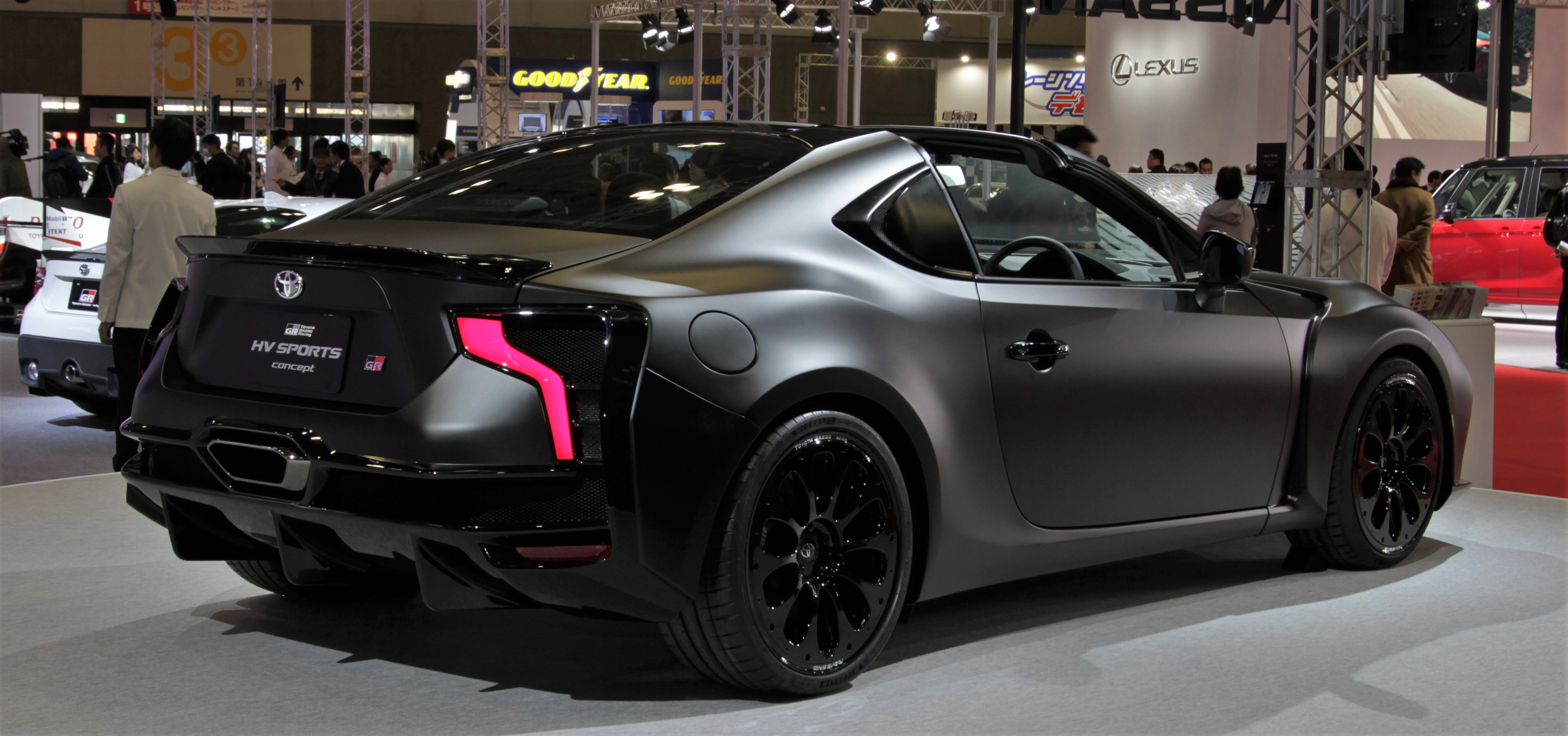
Rear view

== GR Supra Racing Concept (2018) ==
Toyota GR Supra Racing Concept
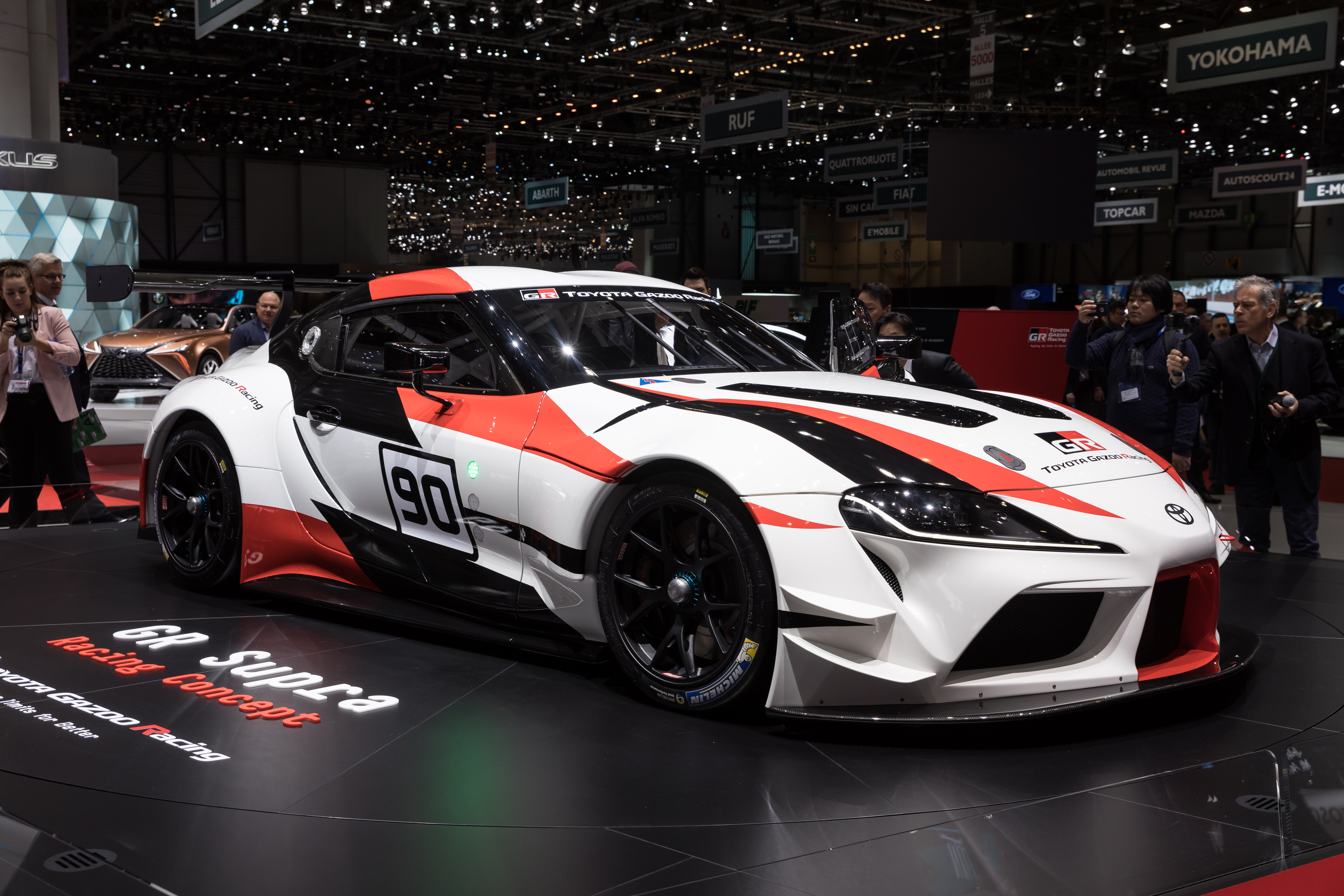
- GR Supra Racing Concept at the 2018 Geneva Motor Show

Overview
- Manufacturer: Toyota
- Production: 2018

Body and chassis
- Body style: 2-door coupe
- Related: Toyota GR Supra GT4 Concept

The GR Supra Racing Concept is a concept car that previews the racing version of the fifth generation Supra that was showcased at the March 2018 Geneva Motor Show. The design was inspired from the 2014 FT-1. It features a lowered suspension with Toyota OEM parts, BBS centre-lock racing wheels, Brembo racing callipers, a full roll cage and fire extinguisher system, a stripped out interior, Michelin track tyres and a centre exit racing exhaust. It also features carbon fibre for the bonnet, splitter, diffuser, mirror caps, side skirts, wing and bumpers. It is unknown what engine powered the concept.

== GR Super Sport Concept (2018) ==
The GR Super Sport Concept is a two-seat concept sports car developed by Toyota Motorsport GmbH under the Gazoo Racing branding, loosely based on the TS050 Hybrid Le Mans Prototype.

== e-Palette (2018) ==
e-Palette
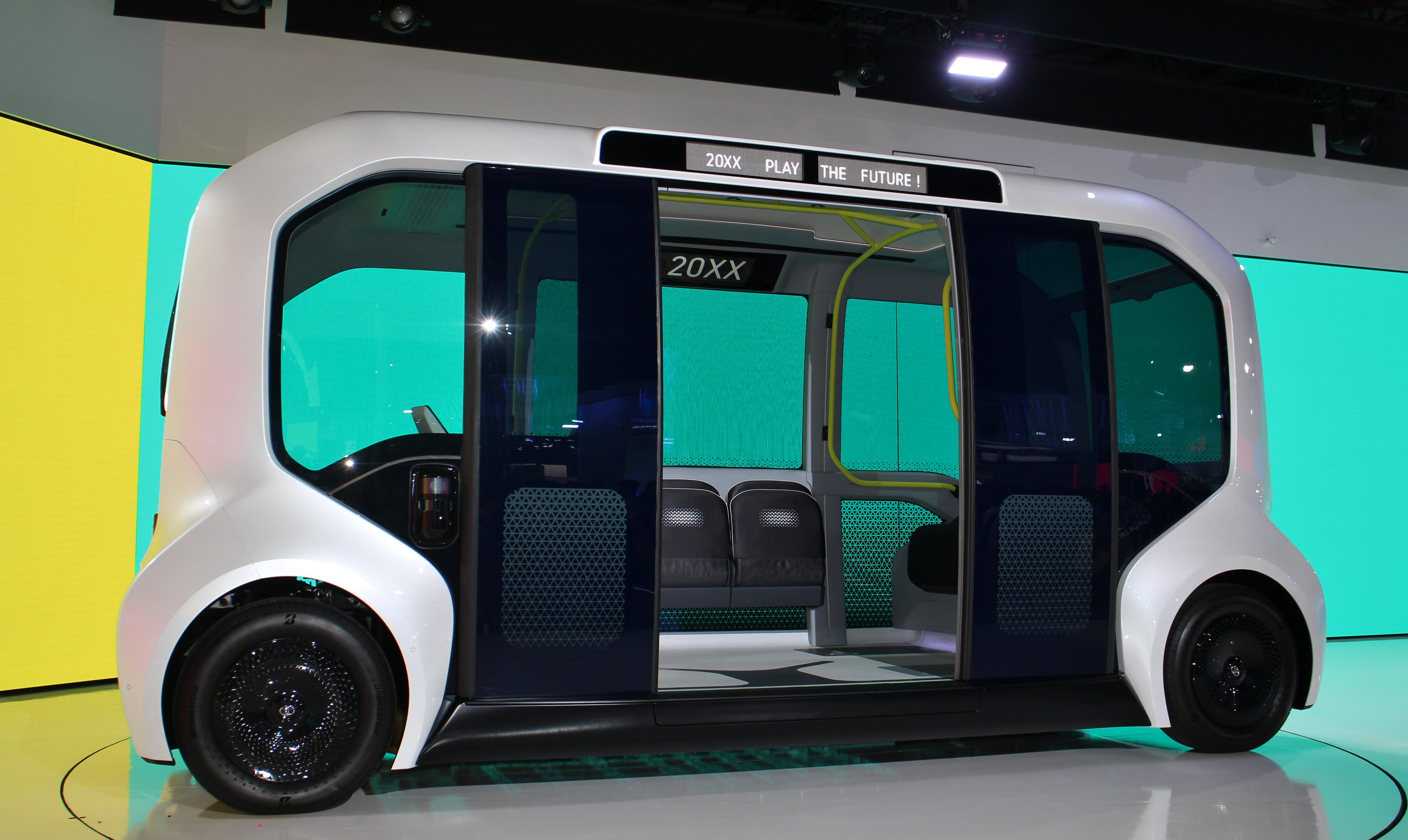
- e-Palette rear side view

Overview
- Manufacturer: Toyota
- Production: 2018

Body and chassis
- Body style: minibus

The e-Palette is a concept automated battery electric minibus shown at the 2019 Tokyo Motor Show. 20 vehicles were to offer SAE level 4 automated transportation at the Tokyo 2020 Olympic and Paralympic villages, although the event was delayed due to the COVID-19 pandemic. Large doors and electric ramps were used to allow Paralympic athletes to board easily.

In August 2021, an e-Palette struck and injured an athlete walking on the pedestrian crossing in the Paralympic Village of the 2020 Summer Paralympics while under manual control by an operator.

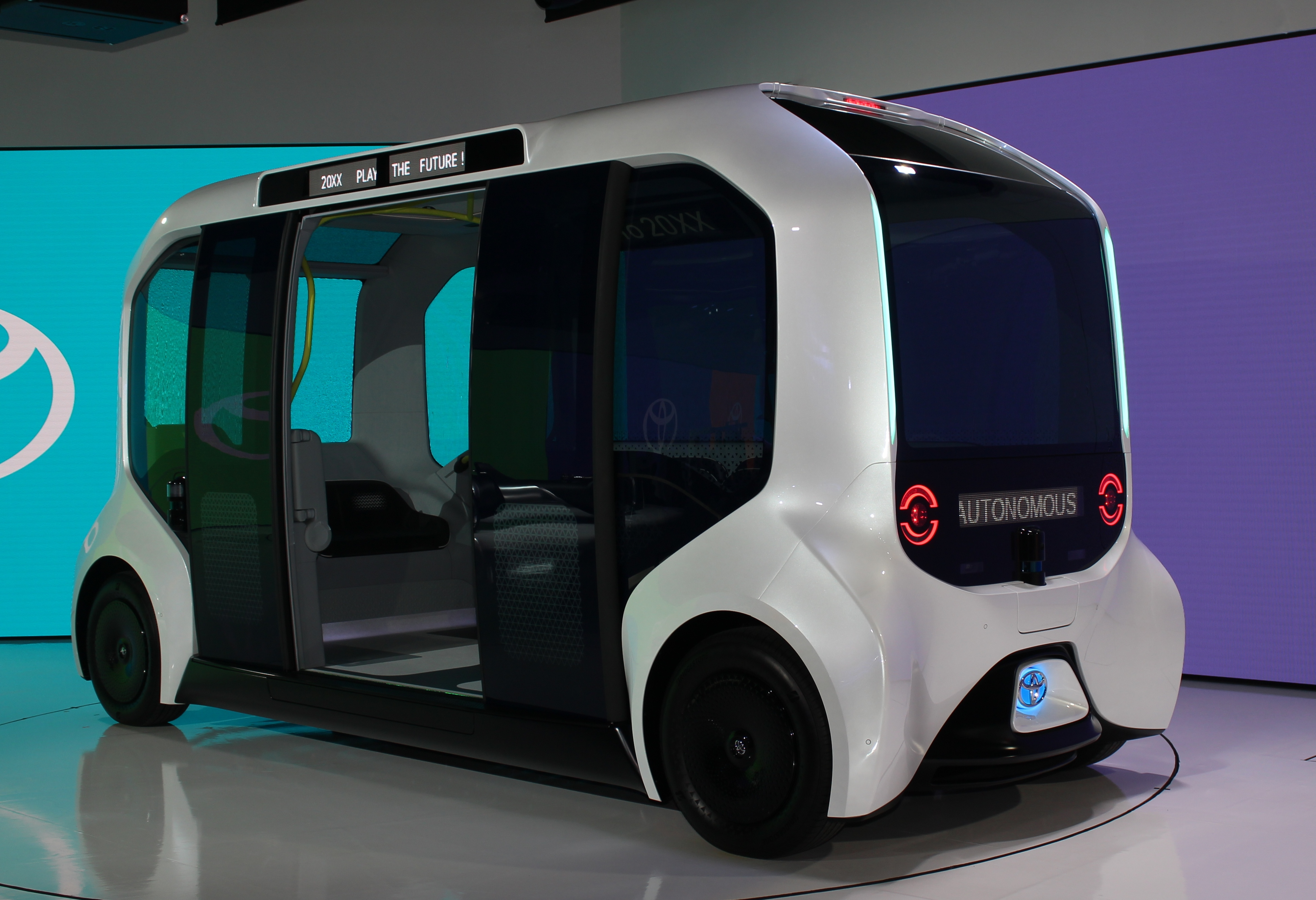
Rear view

== FT-4X Concept (2018) ==
Toyota FT-4X
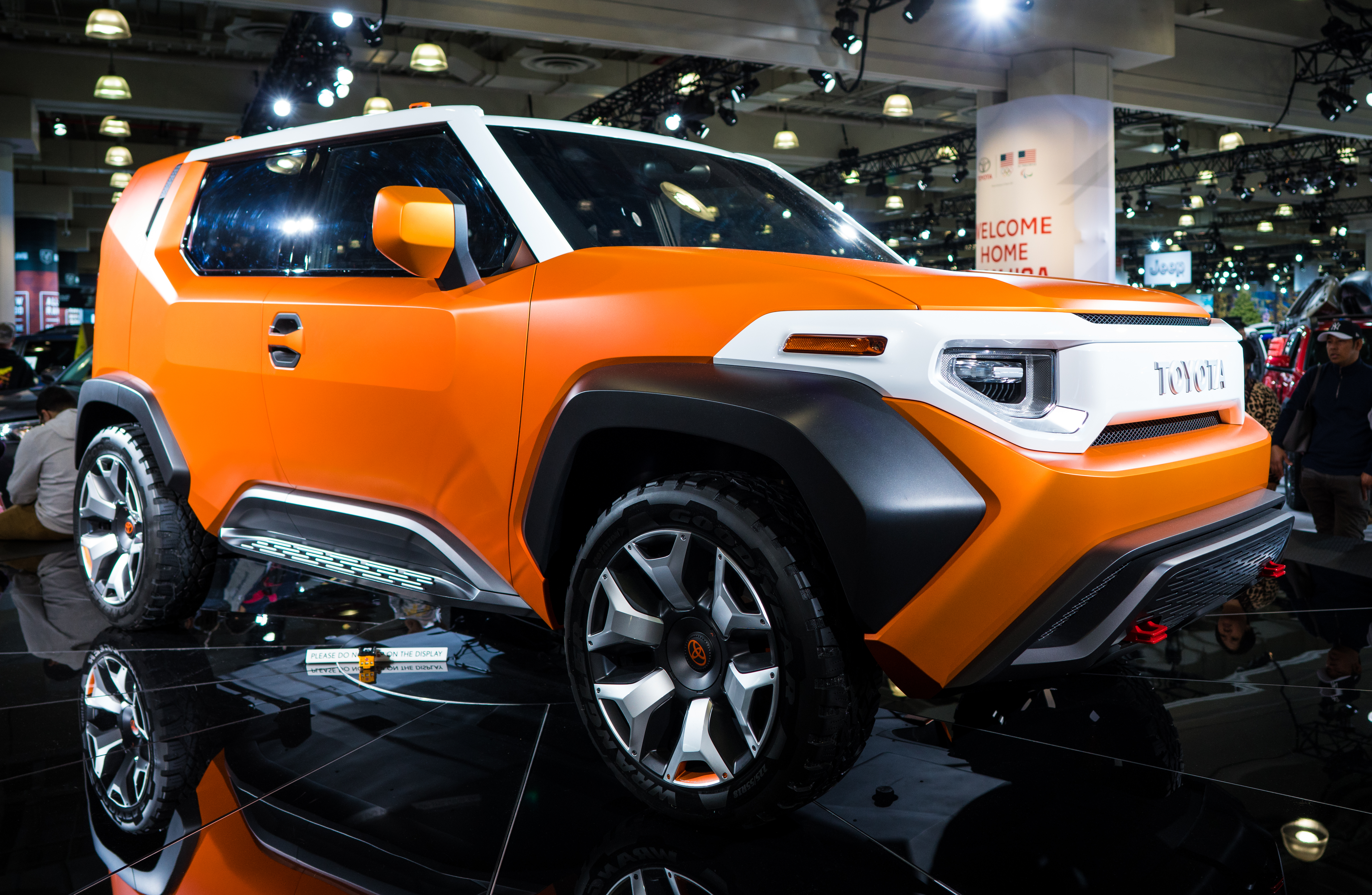
- FT-4X at the 2018 NYIAS

Overview
- Manufacturer: Toyota
- Production: 2018

Body and chassis
- Body style: 5-door SUV
- Layout: Front-engine, four-wheel-drive layout

Dimensions
- Wheelbase: 103.9 in (2,639 mm)
- Length: 167.3 in (4,249 mm)
- Width: 71.7 in (1,821 mm)
- Height: 63.9 in (1,623 mm)

The FT-4X is a concept compact SUV shown at the March 2017 and March 2018 New York International Auto Shows. It was designed by Toyota's Calty Design Research Inc to be a compact off roader, and was equipped with 4WD as well as features such as a GoPro Hero 5 Session camera built into the driver's side rear view mirror, heated and refrigerated storage compartments, removable audio system, rear doorhandles that act as water bottles and a built in The North Face sleeping bag between the front seats. It is proposed to become a production model.

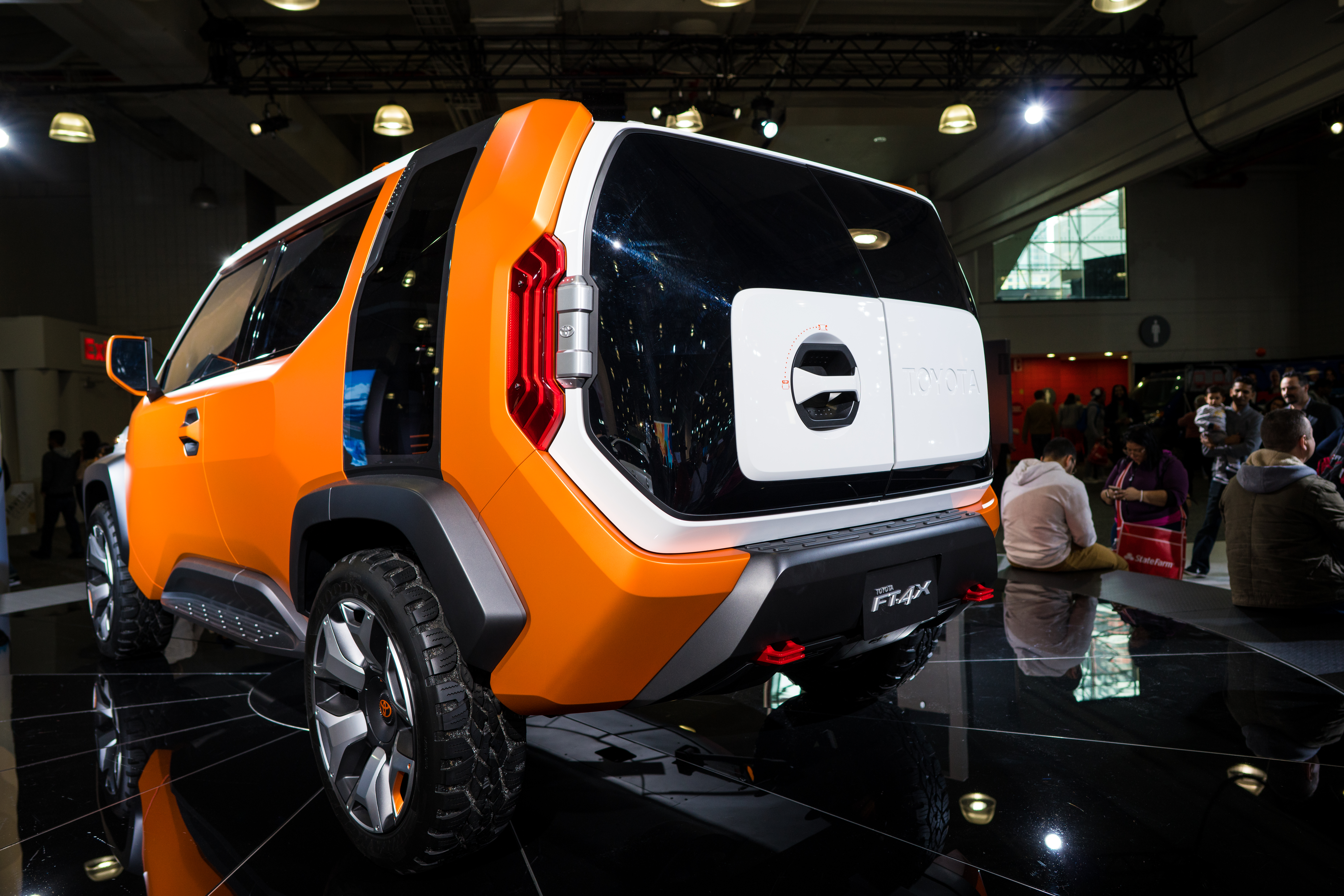
FT-4X rear end

== Noah MU (2018) ==
The Toyota Noah MU is a concept vehicle based on the third generation Toyota Noah. It was shown at the 2018 Tokyo Motor Show. MU stands for multi-utility.

== Sonic Emotion C-HR Concept (2018) ==
Toyota Sonic Emotion C-HR Concept
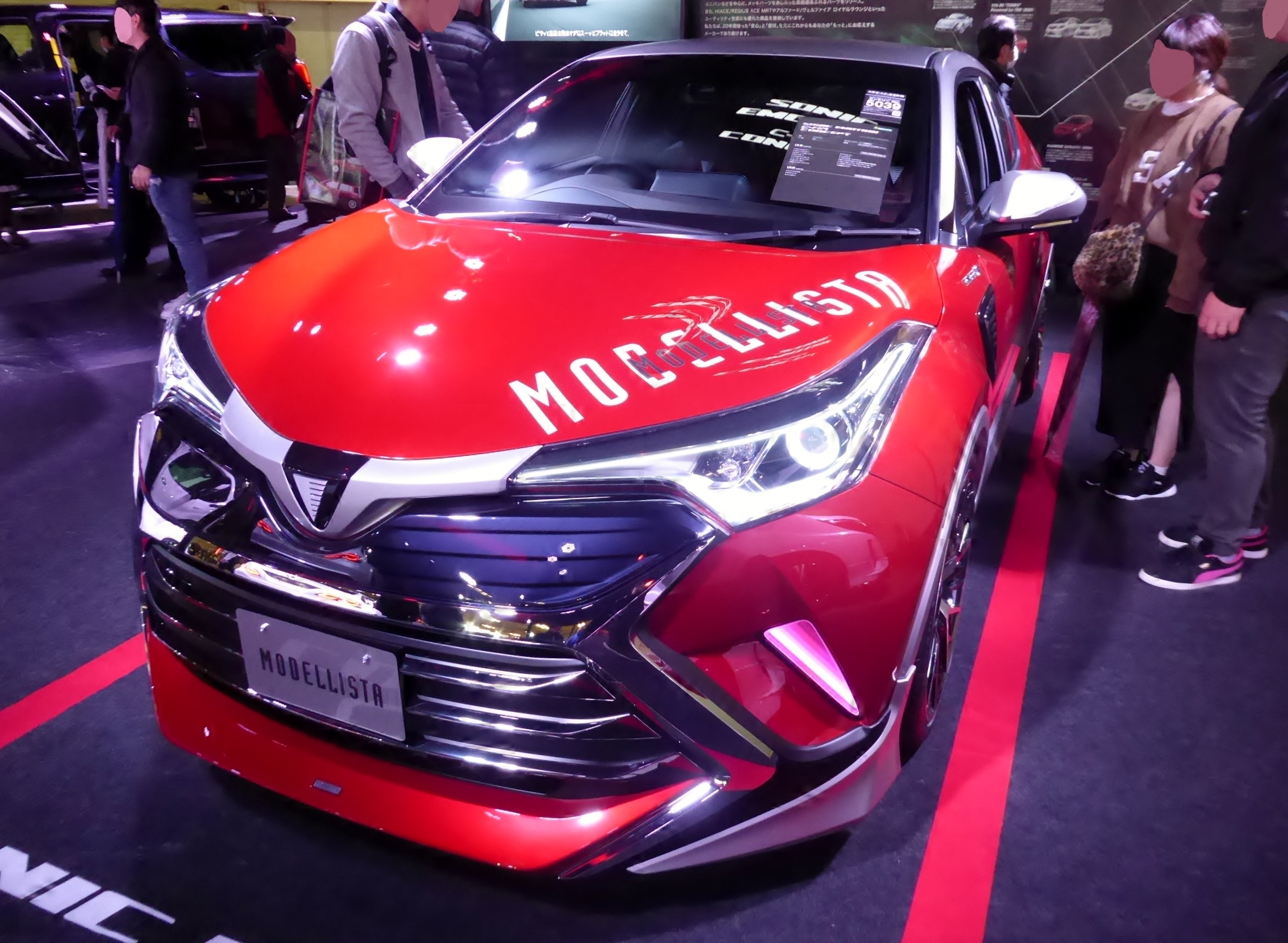

Overview
- Manufacturer: Toyota
- Production: 2018
- Assembly: Japan

Body and chassis
- Class: SUV
- Body style: 5-door SUV

Chronology
- Predecessor: Toyota C-HR

The Toyota Sonic Emotion C-HR Concept was made by Toyota in 2018. It was shown at the Osaka Automesse.

== GR Supra GT4 Concept (2019) ==
Toyota GR Supra GT4 Concept
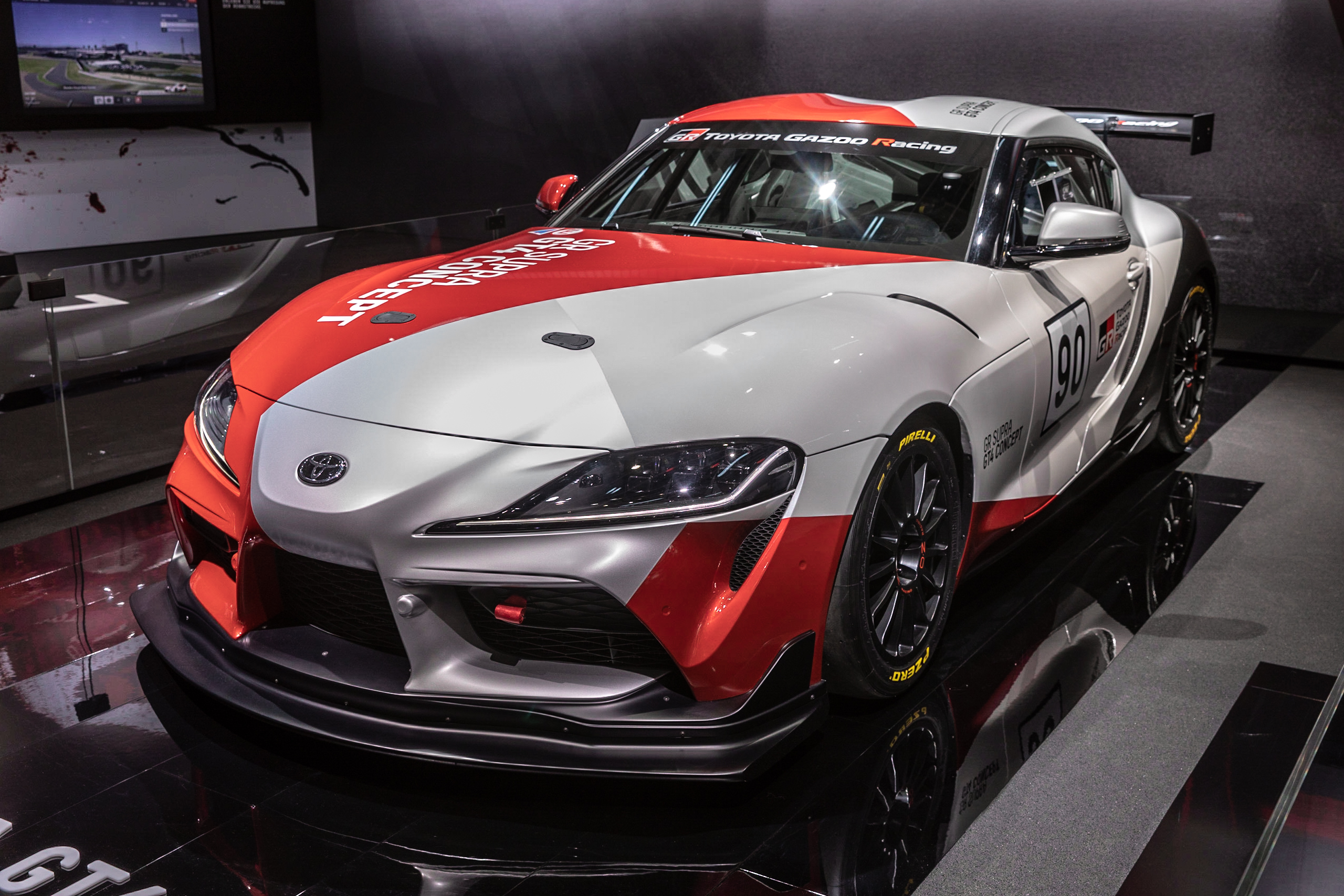

Overview
- Manufacturer: Toyota
- Production: 2019

Body and chassis
- Body style: 2-door coupe
- Related: Toyota GR Supra Racing Concept

Based on the Toyota Supra released in 2019, the GR Supra GT4 Concept is a concept racing car that would be suitable for the European GT4 racing series. It was first shown at the March 2019 Geneva Motor Show. It has been lightened, the brakes and suspension have been upgraded, and a rear wing and roll cage have been added.

== LQ Concept (2019) ==
Toyota LQ Concept
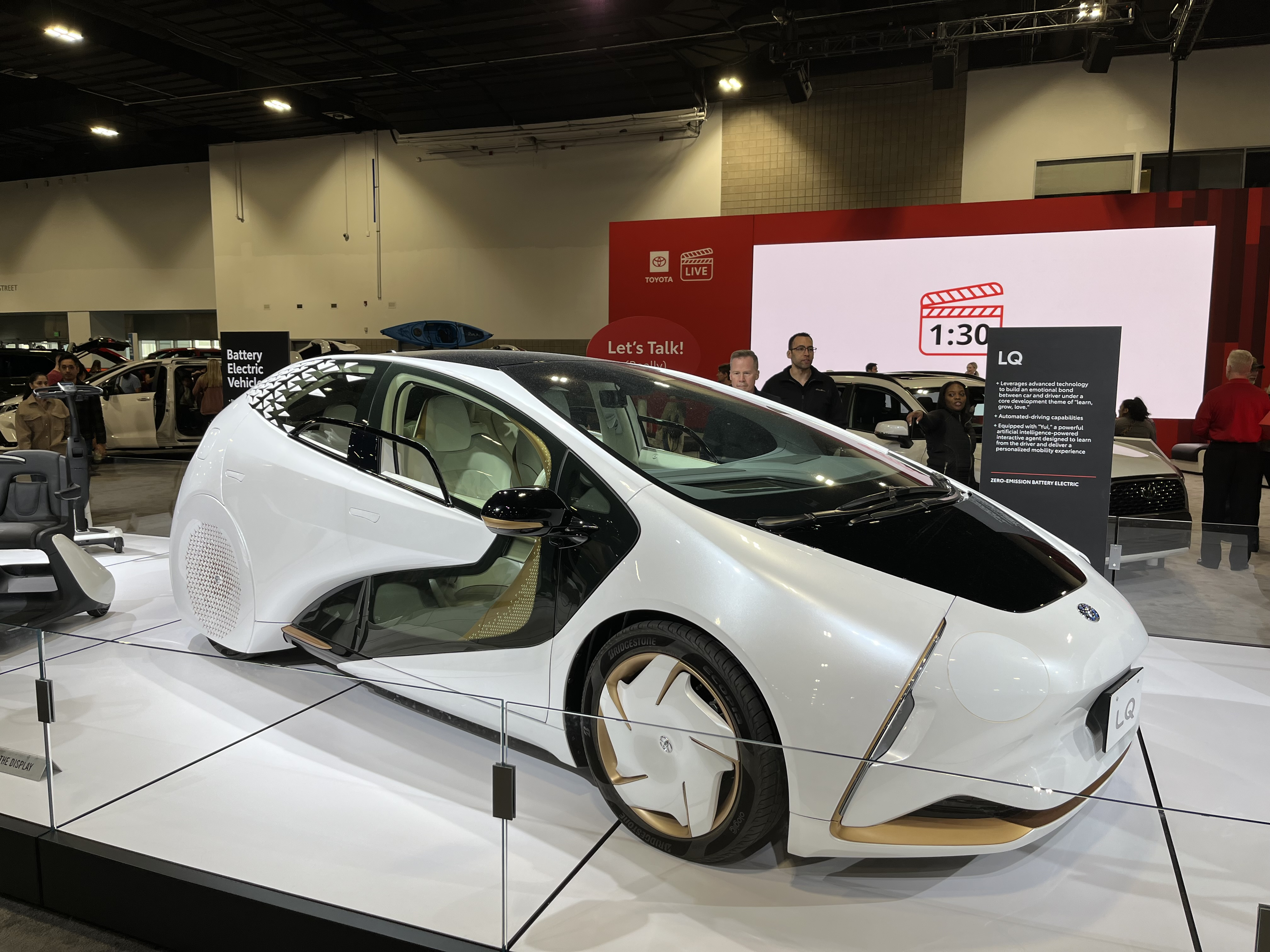
- Toyota LQ Concept at the 2023 Denver Auto Show

Overview
- Manufacturer: Toyota
- Production: 2019

Body and chassis
- Class: Concept car
- Body style: 2-door sedan
- Related: Toyota Concept-i

Powertrain
- Engine: BEV

Dimensions
- Wheelbase: 2,700 mm (106.3 in)
- Length: 4,530 mm (178.3 in)
- Width: 1,840 mm (72.4 in)
- Height: 1,500 mm (59.1 in)
- Curb weight: 1,680 kg (3,704 lb)

The Toyota LQ Concept is a concept car made by Toyota in 2019, and is an evolution of the previous Toyota Concept-i, with a comparatively more production-like design. It was shown at the 2019 Tokyo Motor Show. It includes an artificial intelligence agent "Yui", who delivers a personalized driving experience. Yui creates a unique mobility experience that builds the relationship between vehicle and driver by learning from and responding to individual preferences and needs. Yui can also select and play music based on the driving environment and provide real-time information on topics of interest to the driver. It also features Toyota-developed SAE level 4 equivalent automated driving. Test drives have been available since September 2020 in Tokyo. Another robot in the car is Al. AI can engage with the driver using interactive voice communications, in-seat functions designed to increase alertness or reduce stress, in-vehicle illumination, air conditioning, fragrances and other human-machine interactions (HMI). Automated parking uses an on-vehicle system that identifies the current position of the vehicle using multiple cameras, sonar and radar, 2D road mapping, cameras installed in the parking lot and a control center. Vehicle sensors and parking lot cameras also monitor for other vehicles and pedestrians on the automated driving route, automatically stopping the vehicle when another vehicle or a pedestrian is detected. Driving information such as lane warnings, road signs, and route guidance can be displayed in a three-dimensional and easy-to-understand manner over the scenery seen through the windshield. The system helps keep the driver's eyes on the road thanks to a large 230 inch screen display.

In June 2020, the LQ Concept got a role in the Japanese tokusatsu drama Ultraman Z as a special military vehicle for the unit STORAGE.

In August 2020, Toyota started road testing of the LQ Concept equipped with a solid-state battery.

In August 2021, an updated version of the LQ served in the Tokyo 2020 Summer Olympics torch relay and as the lead vehicle for the men's marathon.

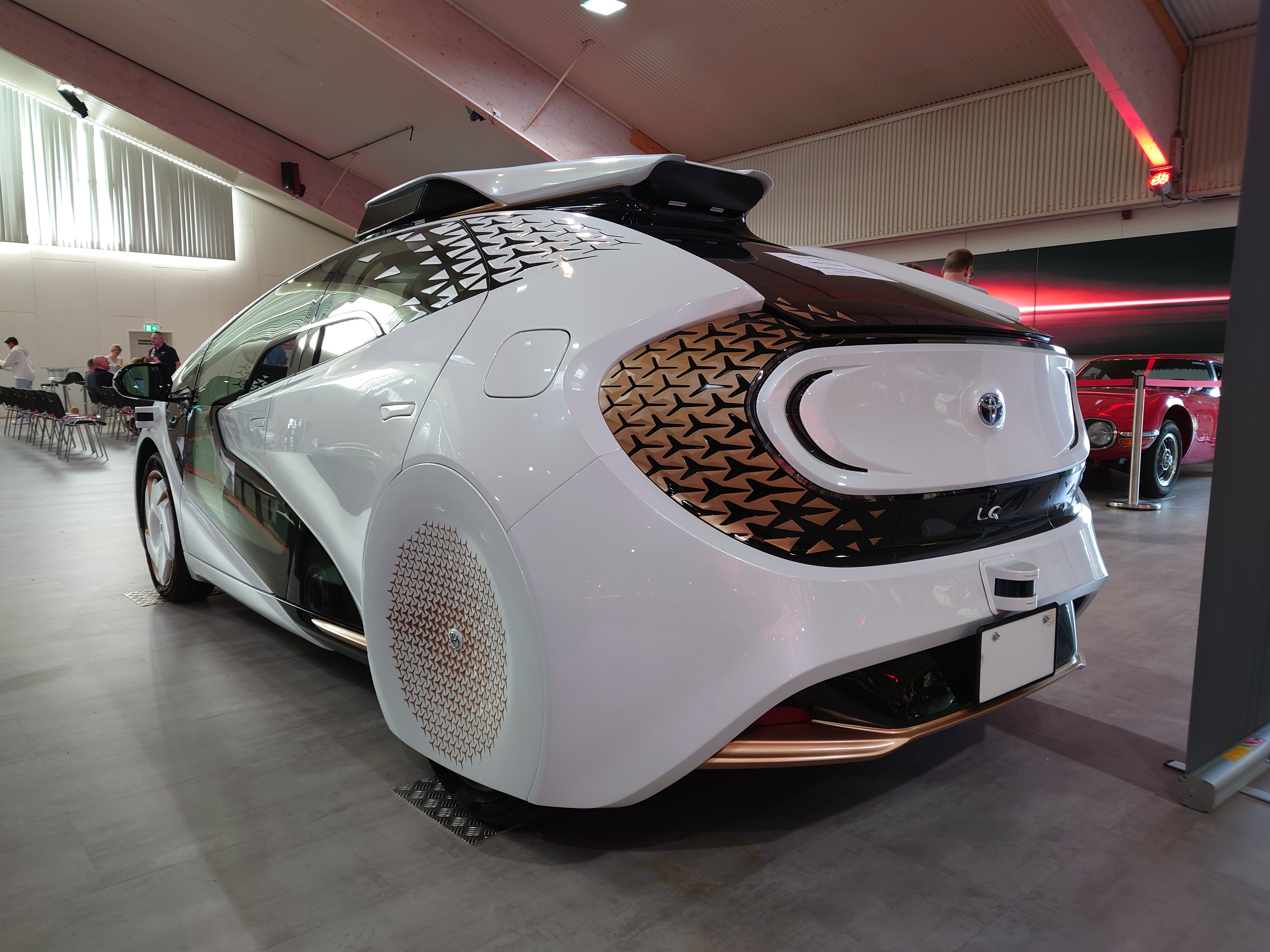
Rear view

== Moving-E (2019) ==
The Toyota Moving-E is a bus made by Toyota in partnership with Honda, introduced in 2019. It carries large amounts of hydrogen, external power output devices, and portable batteries. Its mission is to deliver electricity to communities who have suffered from disasters, such as earthquakes. They used Honda's Power Exporter 9000 portable external power output device, LiB-AID E500 batteries, Honda Mobile Power Pack (MPP), and Honda Mobile Power Pack Charge & Supply Concept charger/discharger for MPP. It can generate 454 kWh with maximum output of 18 kW. It was launched September 2020. The bus includes space for all the equipment, as well as seats for 10 people and 1 bed.

== PieAce (2019) ==
The Toyota PieAce is a convertible Toyota HiAce with a built-in pie oven. It was not actually built but a press release with photoshopped images was released by Toyota Australia as an April Fool's Day joke. As part of the joke, it was claimed that they built 2,019 PieAce's, to match the year 2019.

It was claimed that the soft-top convertible option will be available across the entire new HiAce van range, including the two-seat long wheel base (LWB) and super-long wheelbase (SLWB) configurations, as well as the five-seat LWB crew vans and 12-seat SLWB Commuter buses. The PieAce includes a fan-forced oven and grill with four cooking racks and reaches a top temperature of 250 °C (480 °F). An alarm on the dash lets the driver know when the pie is cooked and ready to eat.

== Unnamed Toyota electric concepts (2019) ==
During a media presentation in June 2019, Toyota revealed images of a 6 unnamed electric concept models, representing future electric models. This series of concepts is possibly named EV-e, as seen badged on some of the models.

- An SUV concept developed with Subaru, which showcased an unnamed concept with a very similar design during a technical meeting in January 2020. Design patents were discovered of both Toyota and Subaru concepts. The concepts would preview the designs of the Toyota bZ4X and the Subaru Solterra.
- A larger SUV concept that greatly resembles the previous concept, but with a longer roofline and a more upright rear. The physical model has the front Toyota badge moved up to the hood compared to the renderings and patents. The design patent of this concept was leaked out.
- A fastback sedan concept. The concepts would preview the designs of the sixtenth-generation Toyota Crown crossover.
- A smaller SUV concept which the design patent was also leaked out with the larger SUV concept.
- The Toyota e-Trans, a crew cab van concept that would be later be fully revealed at the 2019 Tokyo Motor Show.
- A van concept that shares design similarities with the e-Trans.

== APM (2019) ==
Toyota APM
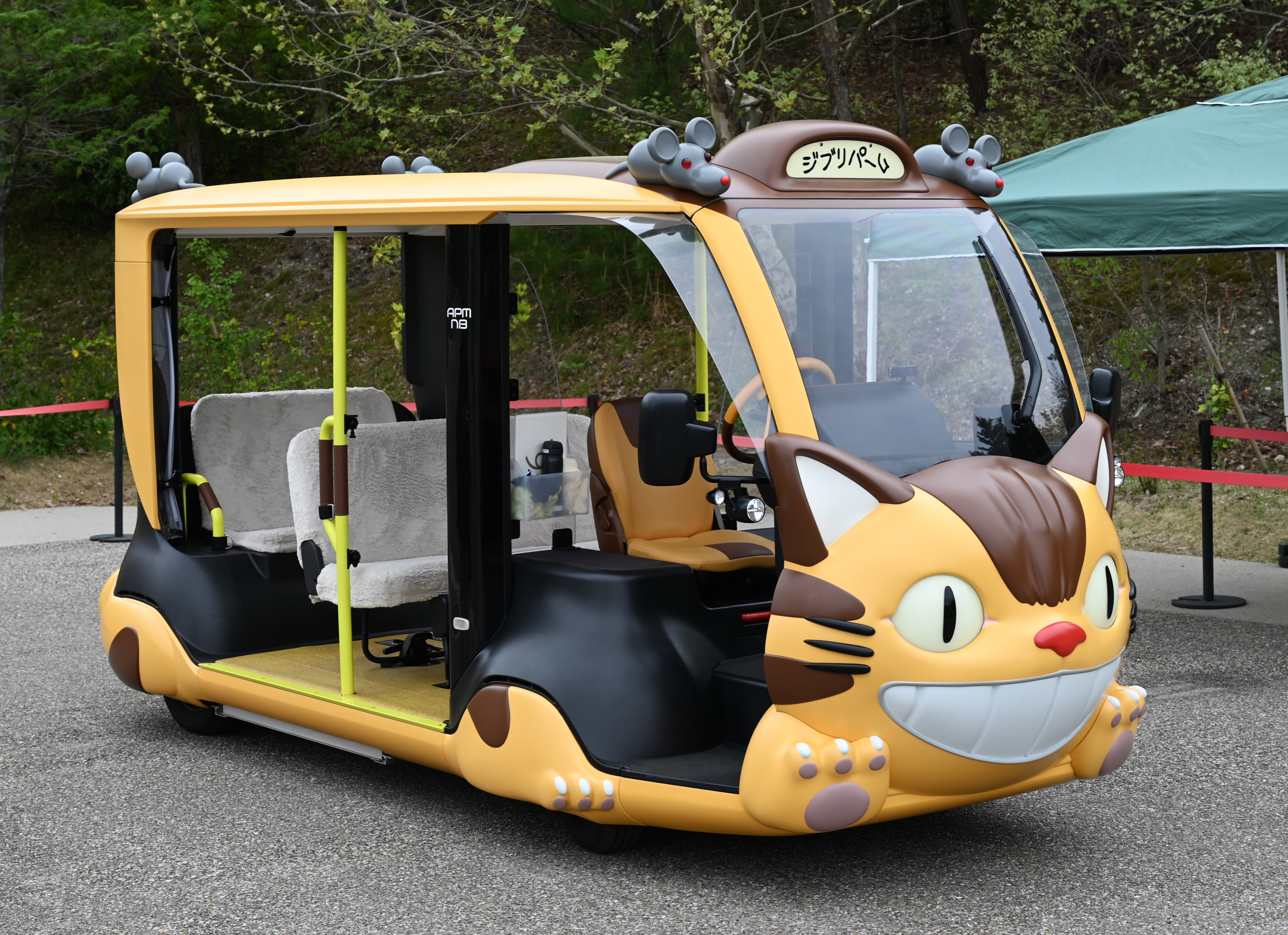

Overview
- Manufacturer: Toyota
- Production: 2019

Body and chassis
- Class: mobility BEV
- Body style: cart

Dimensions
- Length: 3,900 mm (153.5 in)
- Width: 1,600 mm (63.0 in)
- Height: 2,000 mm (78.7 in)

The Accessible People Mover (APM) is a mobility vehicle designed expressly for use at the Tokyo 2020 Summer Olympics and the 2020 Summer Paralympics, unveiled on 18 July 2019.

It has 3 rows of seats, and can hold up to 12 people. The APM has a maximum speed of 19 km/h, with a range of 100 km. Toyota provided 200 of the vehicle to move people at the Olympics. It has Level 4 autonomous driving skills.

== Ultra-Compact BEV (2019) ==
Toyota Ultra-Compact BEV
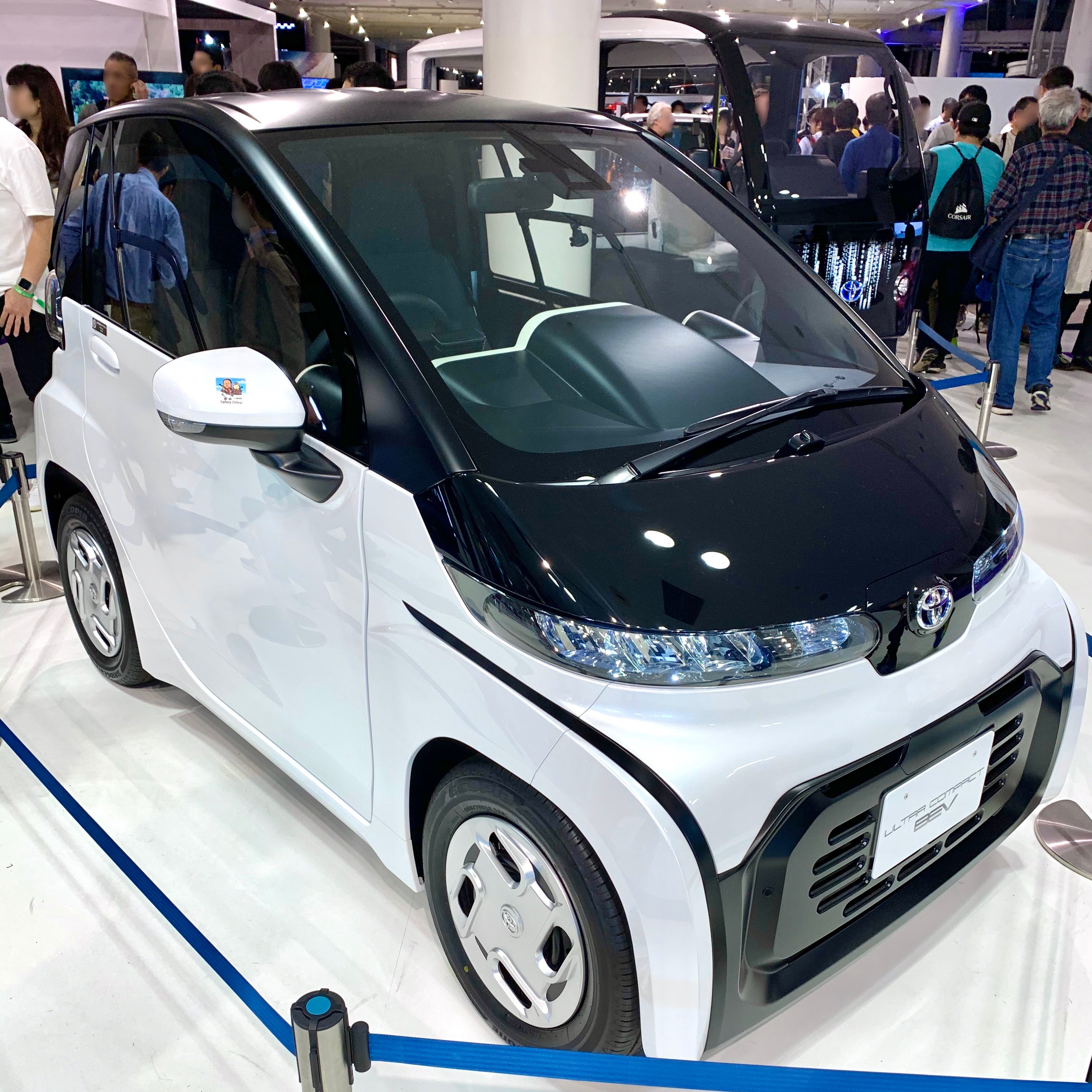
- Toyota Ultra-Compact BEV at the 2019 Tokyo Motor Show

Overview
- Manufacturer: Toyota

Body and chassis
- Class: Kei car
- Body style: 3-door hatchback

Dimensions
- Length: 2,490 mm (98.0 in)
- Width: 1,290 mm (50.8 in)
- Height: 1,550 mm (61.0 in)

Chronology
- Successor: Toyota C+pod

The Ultra-Compact Battery Electric Vehicle (BEV) (Japanese: トヨタ・超小型EV, Toyota Chō Kogata Ībī; lit. Toyota Ultra Small EV) is a concept electric kei car, unveiled on 17 October 2019, as a 2-seater urban EV. The range is estimated at 100 km (62 mi) and has a top speed of 60 km/h (37 mph). It formally debuted at the November 2019 Tokyo Motor Show and would go on sale in Japan in 2020 under the C+pod name. Two versions were presented at launch, one envisioned for personal use and another for business purposes, the latter of which has a configurable interior and will not go into production. A 200 V charger can fully recharge the vehicle in 5 hours.

=== BEV For Business ===
Toyota also created a Ultra-Compact BEV For Business. It was designed for businesses that include repeated short-distance trips and parking, the Ultra-compact BEV Concept Model for Business serves as a "mobile office". It has 3 modes that the driver can set: travel mode, work mode, and break mode. It was introduced in 2020, and shown at the Tokyo Motor Show.

== E-Racer (2019) ==
Toyota E-Racer
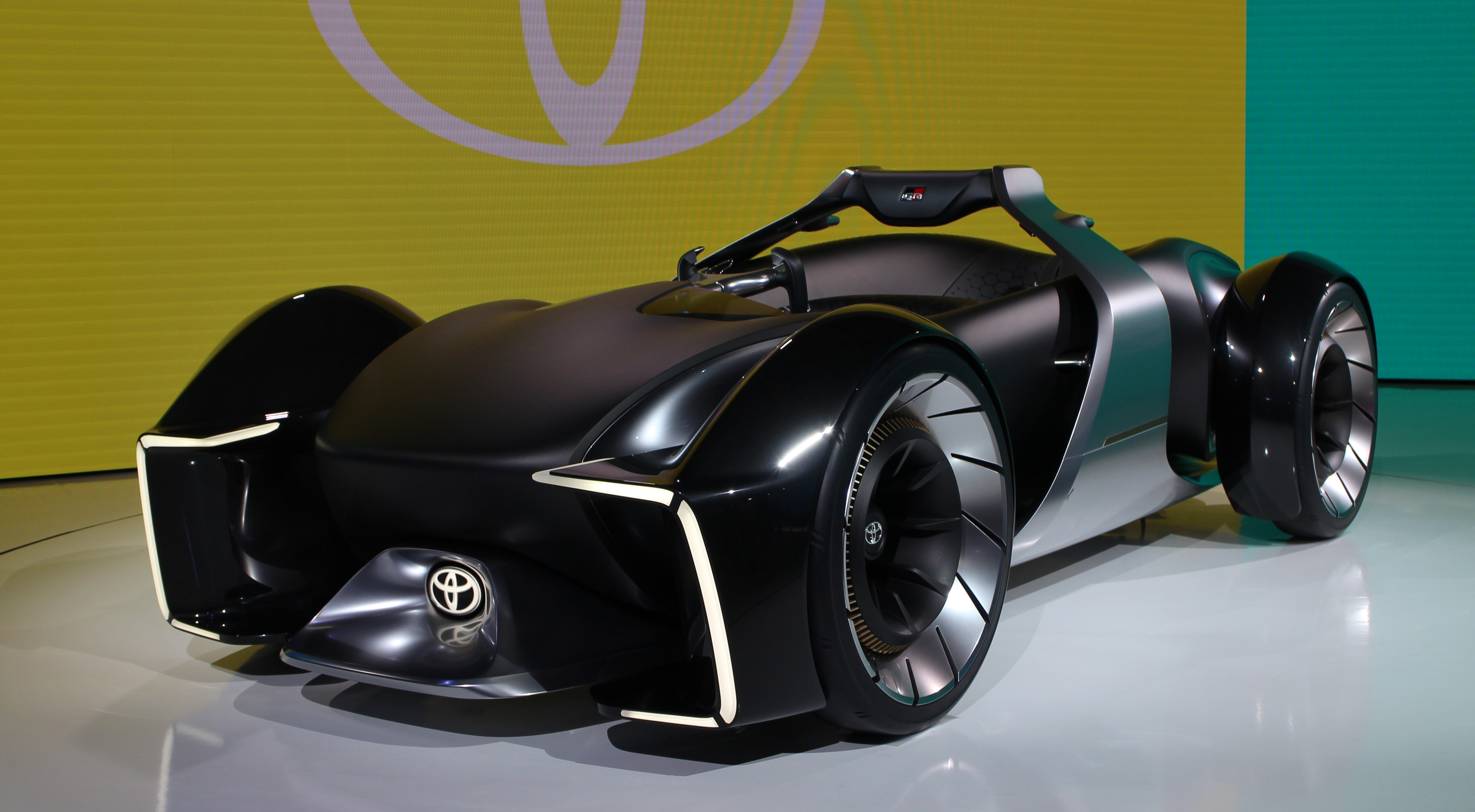

Overview
- Manufacturer: Toyota
- Production: 2019

Body and chassis
- Class: Race car simulation
- Body style: Race car

The E-Racer is an electric race car simulator made by Toyota in 2019. A driver can sit in the non-moving car and, with the use of digital glasses, experience a simulated race course.

== Rhombus (2019) ==
Toyota Rhombus
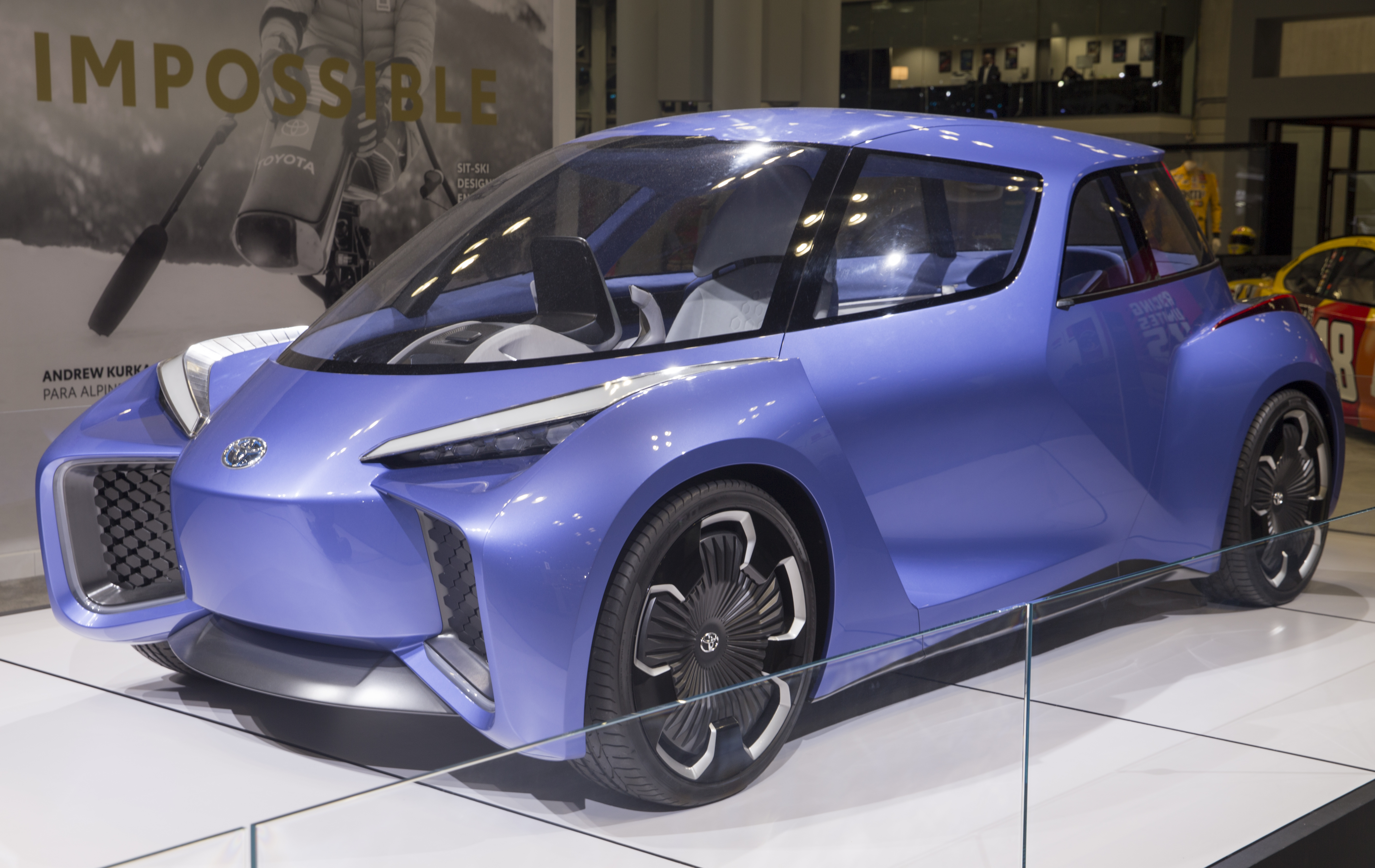

Overview
- Manufacturer: Toyota
- Production: 2019
- Assembly: Changshu, China (TMEC)

Body and chassis
- Body style: 2 door, 4-seat hatchback

The Toyota Rhombus is a rhombus-shaped concept vehicle presented at the 2019 Shanghai Auto Show. It has one driver's seat and room for three passengers behind, in a rhomboid overall layout. Toyota suggested it could be a taxicab in Europe by 2021. It was developed by Toyota's Chinese research and development branch, TMEC (Toyota Motor Engineering & Manufacturing (China) Co., Ltd.).

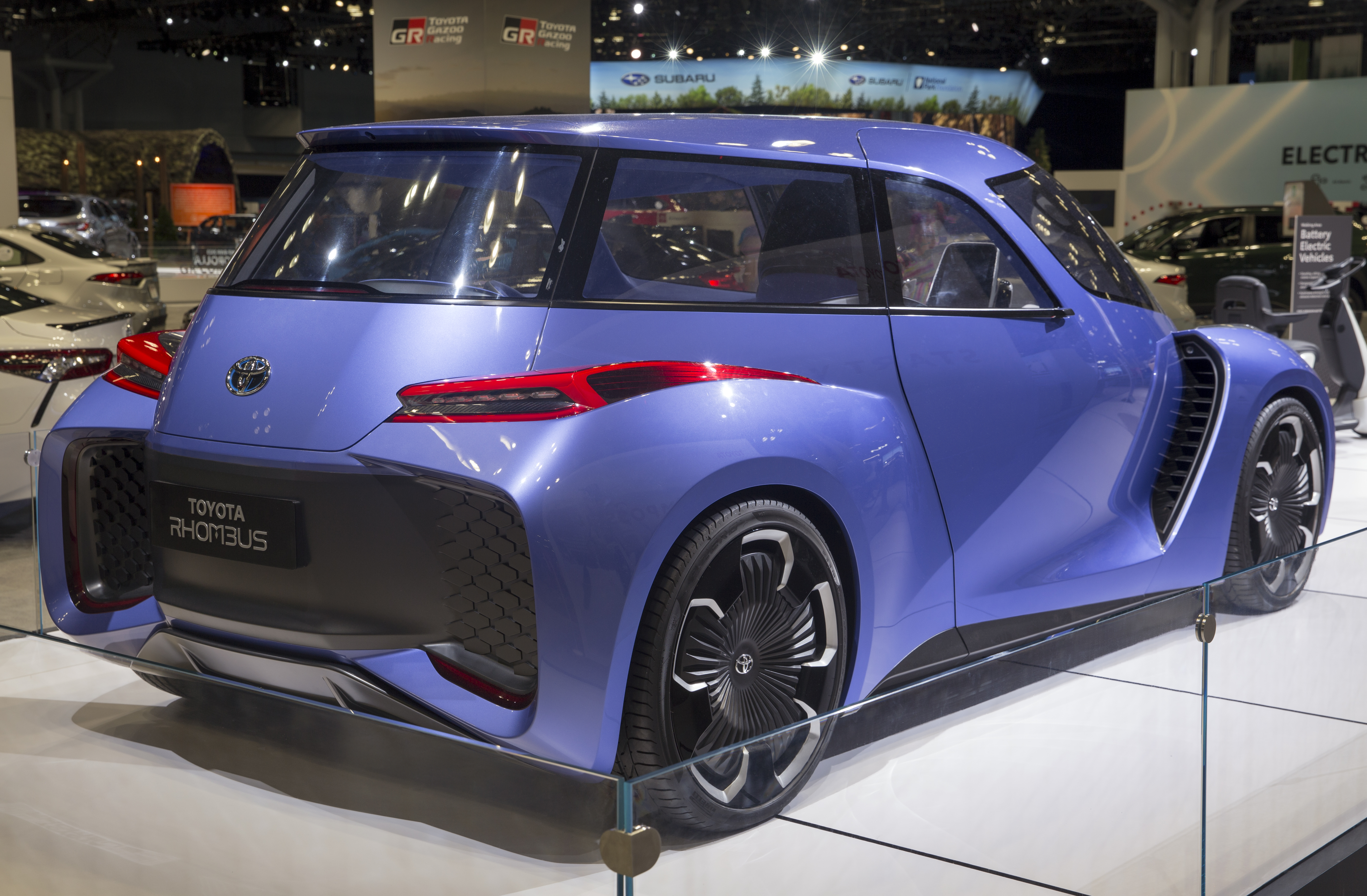
Rear view

== Yaris Adventure (2019) ==
Toyota Yaris Adventure

Overview
- Manufacturer: Toyota
- Production: 2019

Body and chassis
- Class: Subcompact pickup truck
- Body style: 2-door coupé utility
- Layout: All-wheel drive
- Related: Toyota Yaris (DJ)

Powertrain
- Engine: 1.5 L I4 (gasoline)
- Power output: 103 hp (77 kW; 104 PS)
- Transmission: 6-speed automatic

Dimensions
- Length: 4,250 mm (167.2 in)

The Yaris Adventure is a concept subcompact pickup truck made in 2019. It was a vehicle for 2020 April Fools Day, similar to the PieAce which was launched as an April Fools' joke in 2019. The concept vehicle has 2 doors and 2 seats. It has a 1.5-liter inline-four engine that produces a claimed 77 kW (103 hp; 104 PS), as well as having a 135 kg (297 lb) payload capacity.

== See also ==
- Toyota concept vehicles (1935–1969)
- Toyota concept vehicles (1970–1979)
- Toyota concept vehicles (1980–1989)
- Toyota concept vehicles (1990–1999)
- Toyota concept vehicles (2000–2009)
- Toyota concept vehicles (2020–2029)
