= Audi R8 (Type 4S) =

Sports car

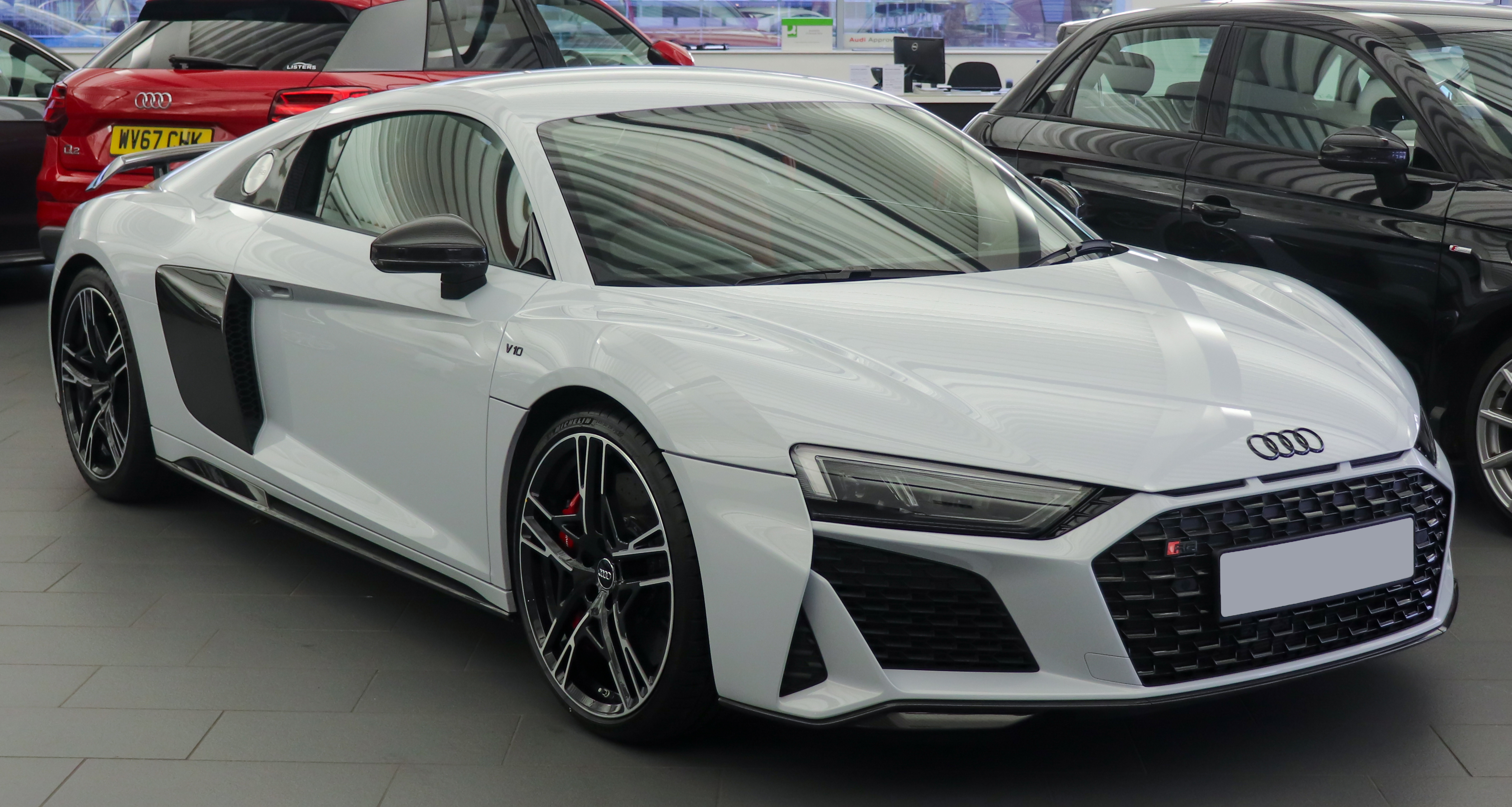
- Audi R8 V10 (post facelift)

Overview
- Manufacturer: Audi Sport GmbH; (subsidiary of Audi AG)
- Production: December 2014–2024
- Model years: 2016–2024
- Assembly: Germany: Heilbronn (Audi Böllinger Höfe)
- Designer: Florian Liese (2013); Manu Müller (facelift, 2018)

Body and chassis
- Class: Sports car (S)
- Body style: 2-door coupé; 2-door convertible (spyder)
- Layout: Longitudinal, Mid-engine, all-wheel drive; Longitudinal, mid-engine, rear-wheel-drive (standard models)
- Platform: Volkswagen Group Modular Sports System Platform
- Related: Lamborghini Huracán; Italdesign Zerouno; Ares Design Project1; Engler Superquad

Powertrain
- Engine: 5.2 L V10 FSI
- Transmission: 7-speed DL800 S-Tronic dual clutch

Dimensions
- Wheelbase: 2,650 mm (104.3 in)
- Length: 4,426 mm (174.3 in)
- Width: 1,940 mm (76.4 in)
- Height: 1,240 mm (48.8 in)
- Curb weight: Coupé: 1,695 kg (3,737 lb); Spyder: 1,795 kg (3,957 lb); V10 Plus Coupé: 1,645 kg (3,627 lb); V10 Plus Spyder: 1,695 kg (3,737 lb); RWS: 1,590 kg (3,505 lb)

Chronology
- Predecessor: Audi R8 (Type 42)

The Audi R8 (Type 4S) is the second generation of the R8 sports car manufactured by German automobile manufacturer Audi. The Type 4S is based on the Lamborghini Huracán and shares its platform and engine. The Type 4S was introduced at the 2015 Geneva Motor Show and its production began in late 2014.

== Development ==
Development of the Type 4S began in 2013 and prototypes began testing in early-2014. The Type 4S is based on the Modular Sports System platform shared with the Lamborghini Huracán. The V10 engine used in the Huracàn was detuned for the base model while the power output of the engine remained the same as the Huracàn for the V10 plus model. Rumors for the V8 engine for the R8 were in circulation but those were proven wrong as the company stated that the V8 engine would be discontinued mainly because of emissions regulations. The Type 4S was introduced at the 2015 Geneva Motor Show. The all-electric version called the e-Tron which was in development phase in the production life span of the Type 42 was also introduced at the same occasion and was now based on the Type 4S.

== Road models ==
=== R8 Coupé ===
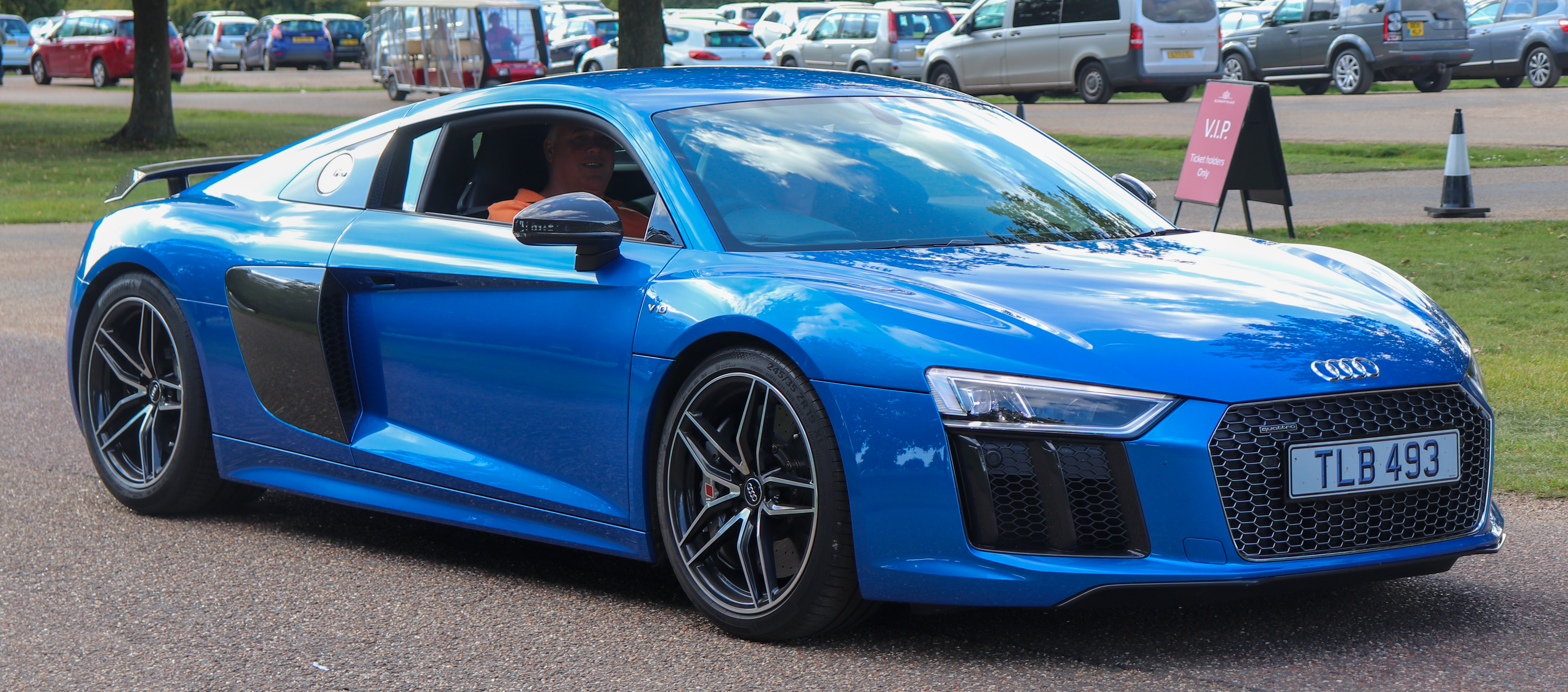

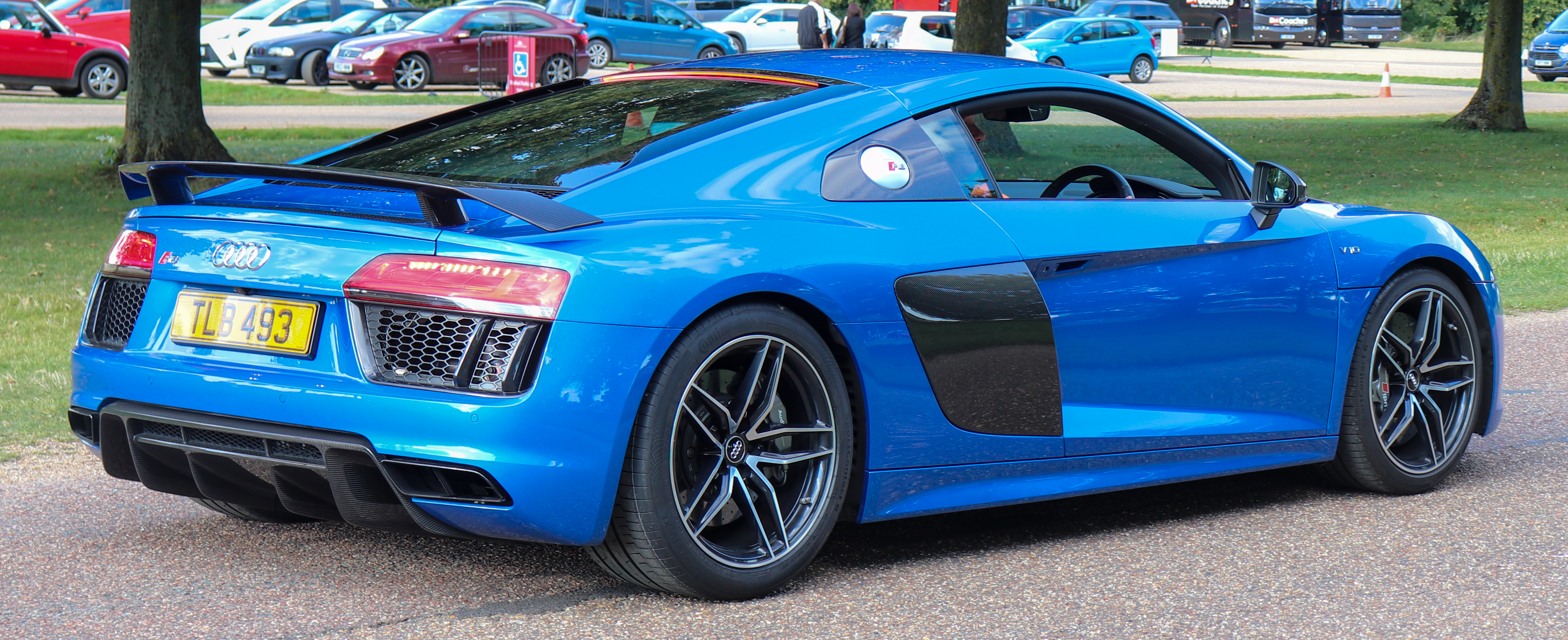
Audi R8 V10 plus coupé

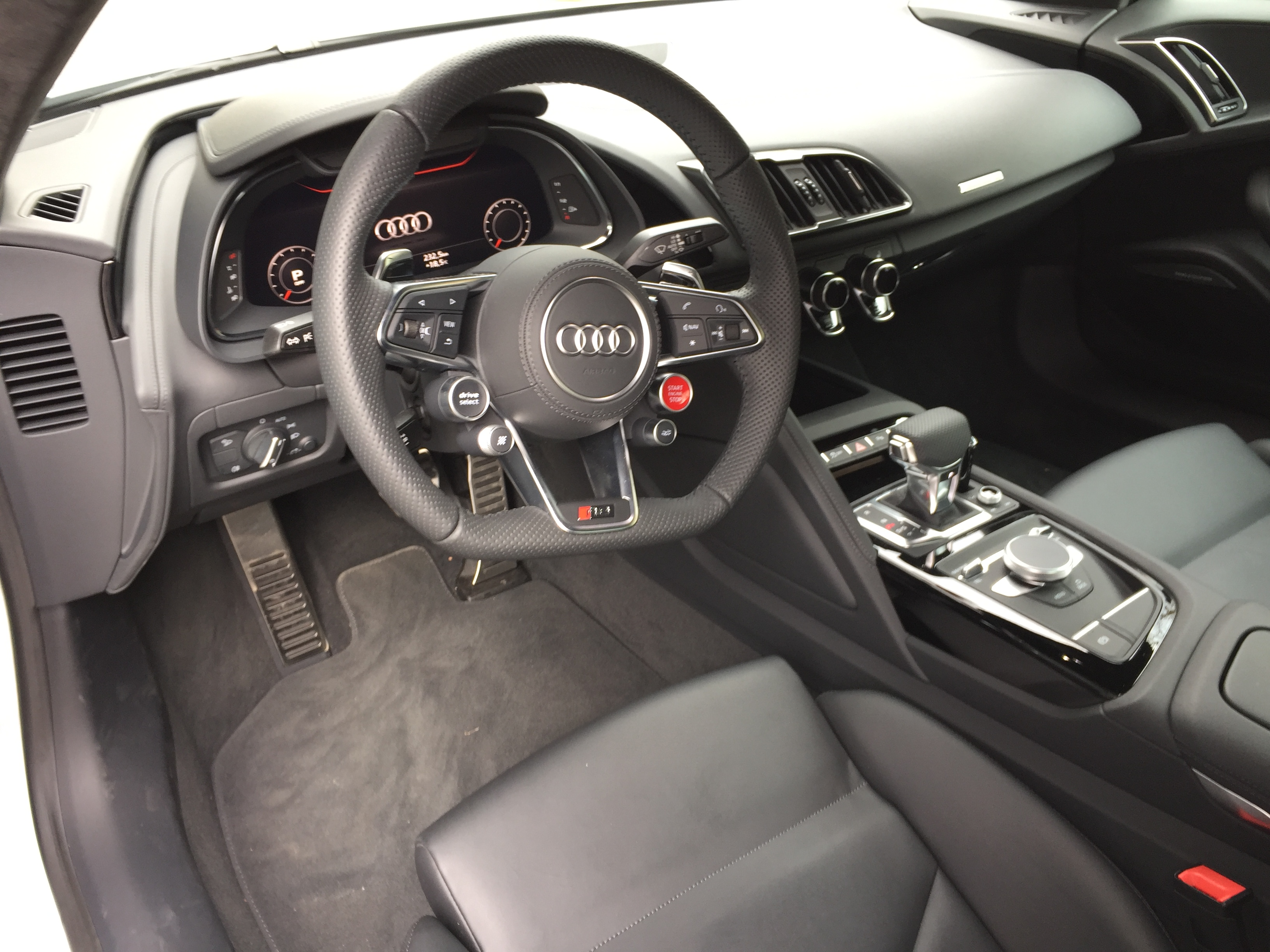
Interior

The new R8 has two production variants, the base 5.2 FSI model with a 540 PS (397 kW; 533 hp) V10 engine and the more powerful V10 Plus with a 610 PS (449 kW; 602 hp) engine. The body is lighter and stiffer, due to the substitution of several large aluminium parts in the shell by carbon fibre. Extra electronics are incorporated in the chassis as compared to the first generation to improve handling. The ‘Virtual Cockpit’ first introduced in the TT was also made available. The all-wheel-drive system and the 7-speed S-Tronic transmission are standard with no manual transmission available. The Quattro all-wheel-drive system used on the R8 is slightly rear-biased with power delivery to the wheels variable. A water-cooled front differential and a passive limited-slip rear differential along with an electromechanical power steering contribute to the agile handling of the car. The variable magnetic-ride suspension is available as an option but is exclusive to the European markets.

The design reflects Audi's current design language implemented on all of its models, as an evolution of Frank Lamberty's original design of the first generation. The distinctive "side-blades" present behind the doors on the Type 42 have now been split into two and are now present on the rear side windows and below the beltline. The side blades can be optioned in body colour. Audi's trademark LED headlamps were standard on the car and the newly developed laser headlamps are available as an option in Europe only.

The R8 is available with 19-inch wheels as standard with 20-inch wheels available as an option. Carbon-ceramic brakes are also optional equipment.

In July 2020, Audi announced that it would be discontinuing the 5.2 FSI model in the United States. A special model called the limited edition having production limited to 25 Coupes and 5 Spyders was introduced. The limited-edition is available in three special colours namely Mugello Blue with Pastel silver interior, Avus Silver with black interior with silver stitching, and Sonoma Green with black interior and red stitching. All cars have diamond-stitched Alcantara headliners along with special 20-inch milled silver wheels.

=== R8 Spyder ===
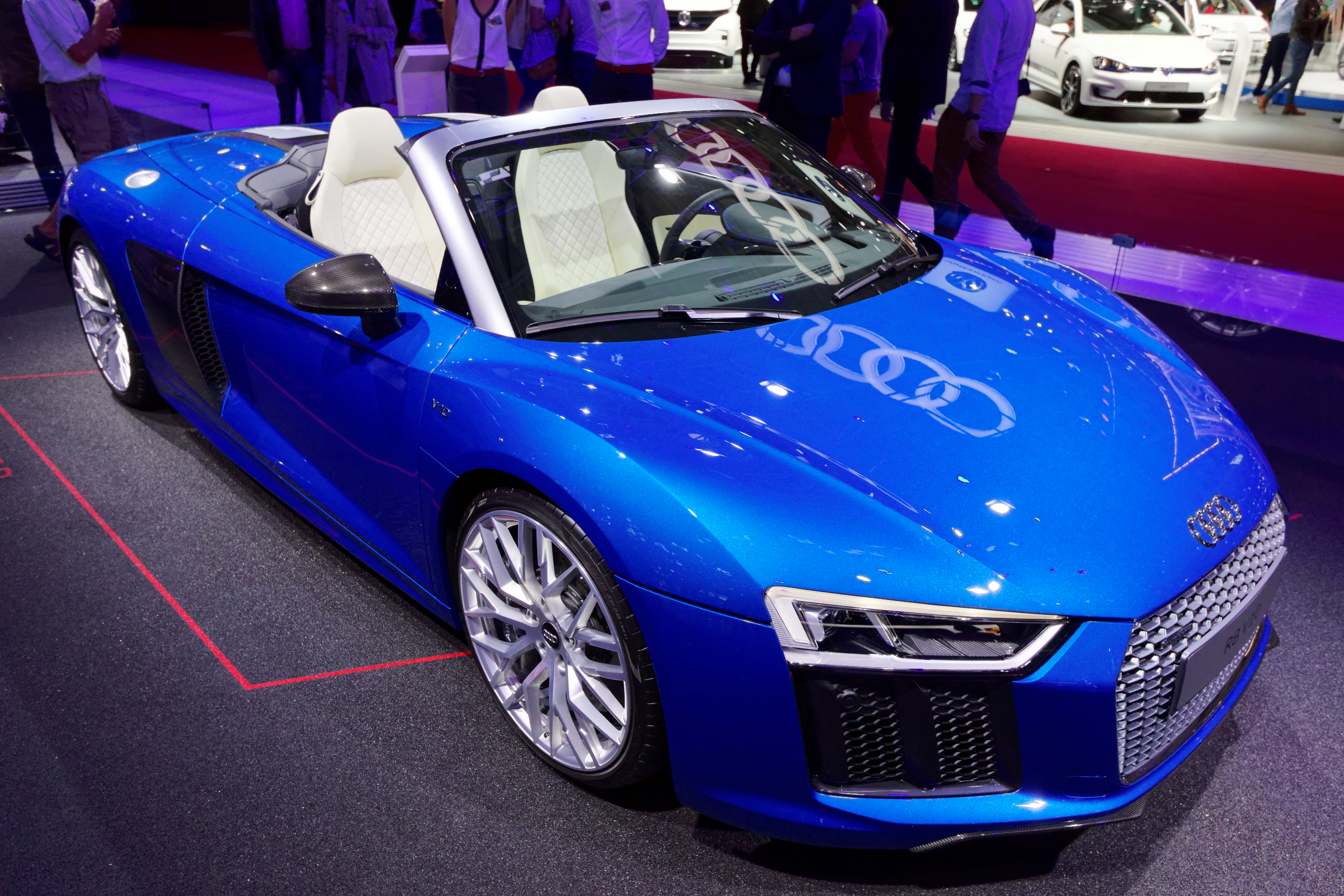
Audi R8 Spyder

Presented at the 2016 New York International Auto Show, the R8 Spyder is the convertible variant of the new R8. Initially, it was only available with the standard V10 engine, which has a power output of 540 PS (397 kW; 533 hp), although a V10 Plus Spyder with the engine having a power output of 610 PS (449 kW; 602 hp) was added to the range in mid-2017. The redesigned soft top of the Spyder is operable at speeds up to 50 km/h (31 mph).

=== R8 RWS ===
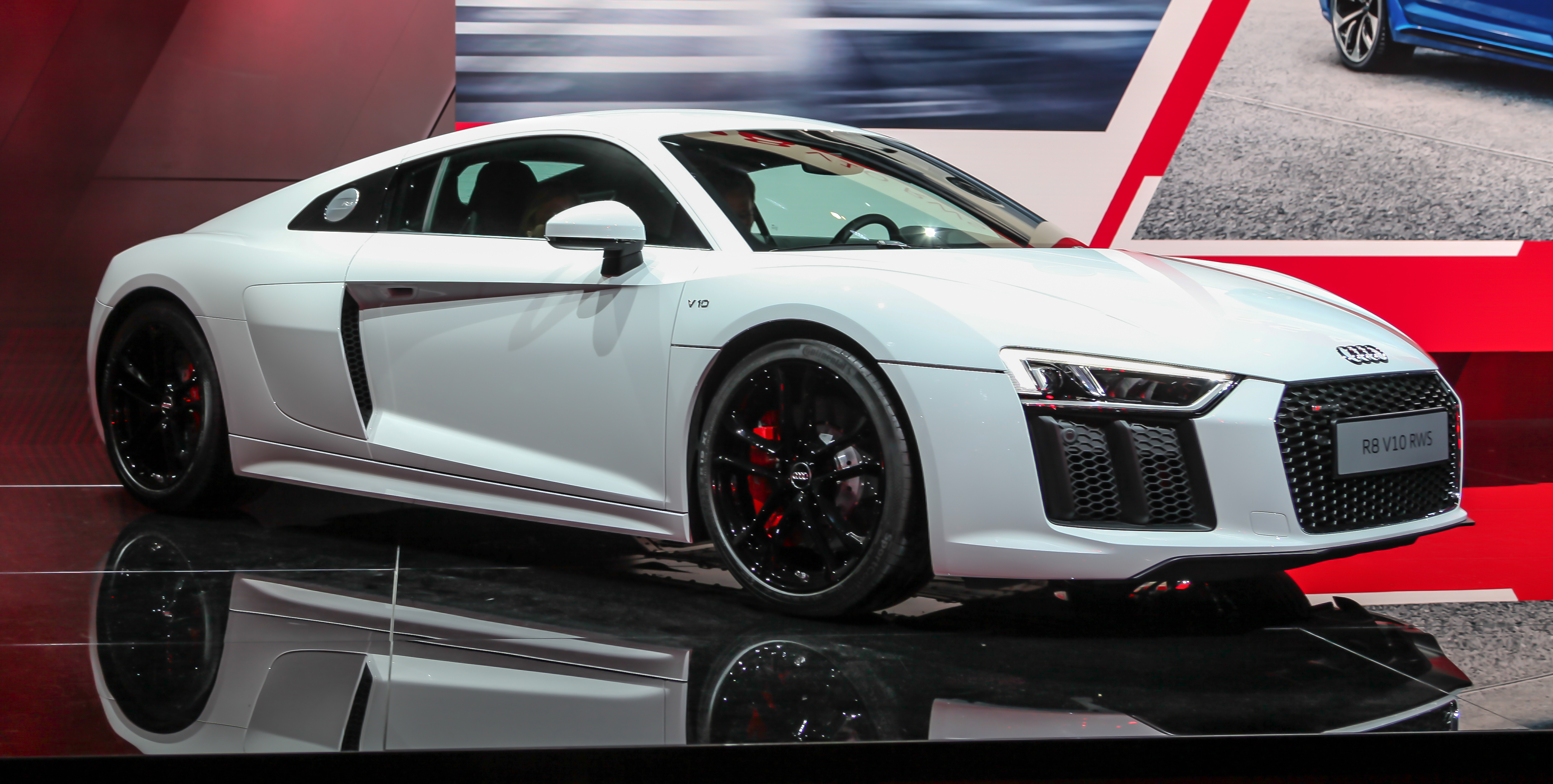
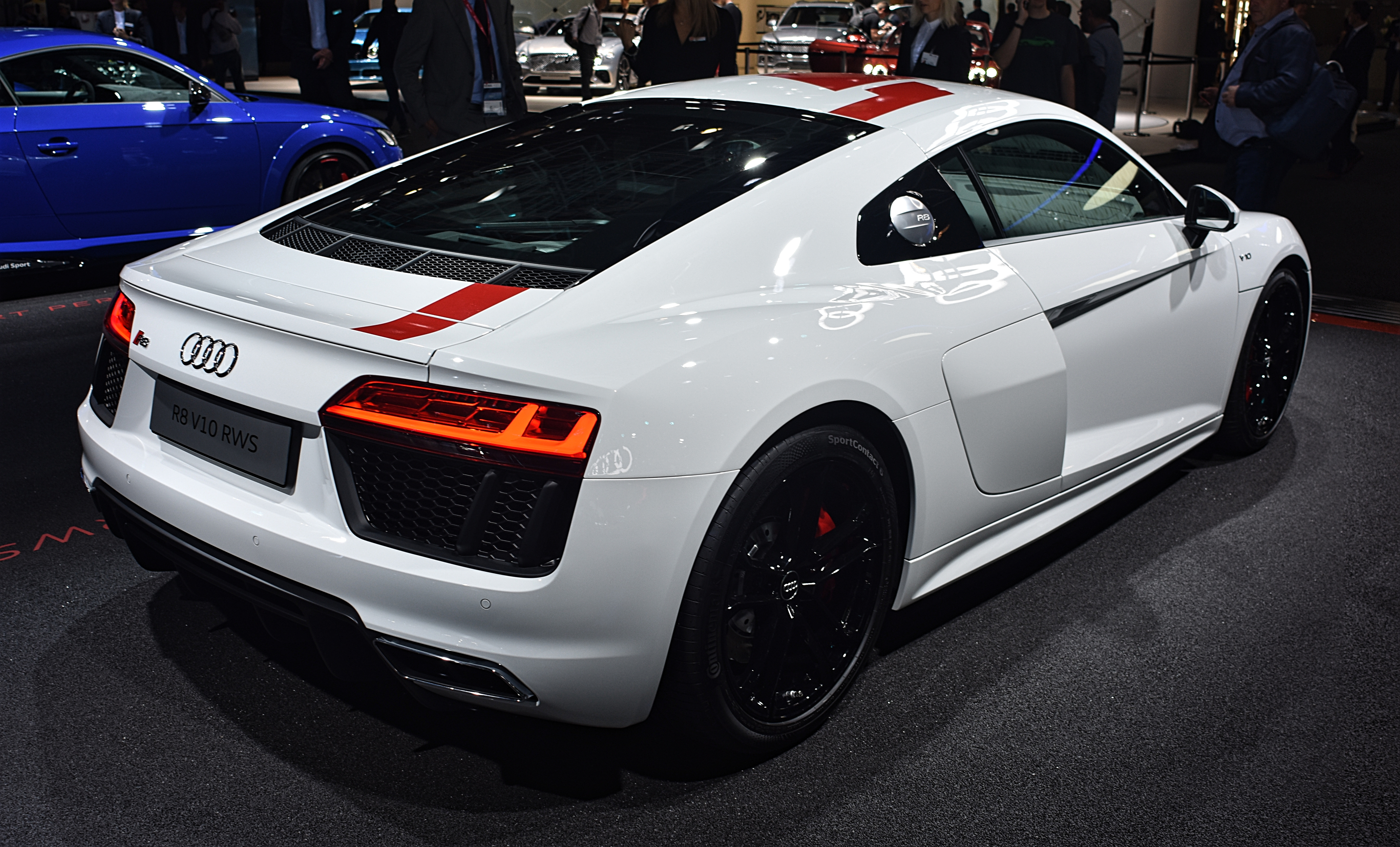
Audi R8 RWS

Unveiled at the 2017 International Motor Show Germany, the R8 RWS (Rear Wheel Series) is the rear-wheel-drive variant of the Audi R8 limited to 999 units. It utilises the same 540 PS (533 hp; 397 kW) V10 engine of the standard R8 V10. Because of the removal of the all-wheel-drive system, weight is reduced by 50 kg (110 lb) at 1,590 kg (3,505 lb) for the coupe. For Spyder, weight is reduced by 40 kg (88 lb) at 1,680 kg (3,704 lb). Weight distribution are 40.6:59.4 for Coupé and 40.4:59.6 for Spyder. Visually, the R8 RWS is signified by a matte-black grille, matte-black front and rear airflow openings, and a gloss-black upper side blade. A red vinyl trim stripe that stretches from the front left to the right rear is optional. The quattro badge on the interior passenger dash is replaced by the RWS badge instead. Sports seats are standard, as are black 19-inch wheels wrapped in 35-series tyres.

== Facelift ==
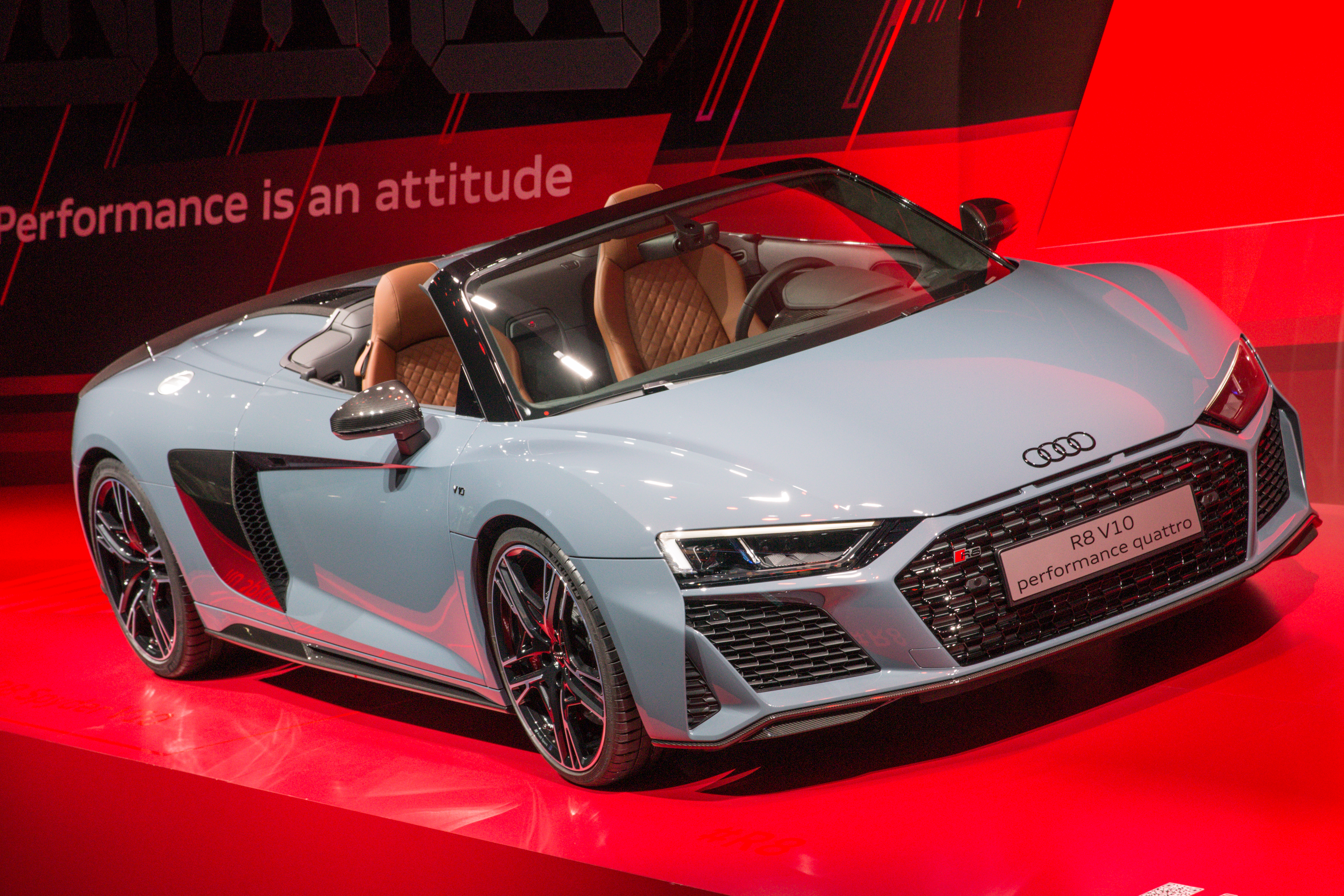
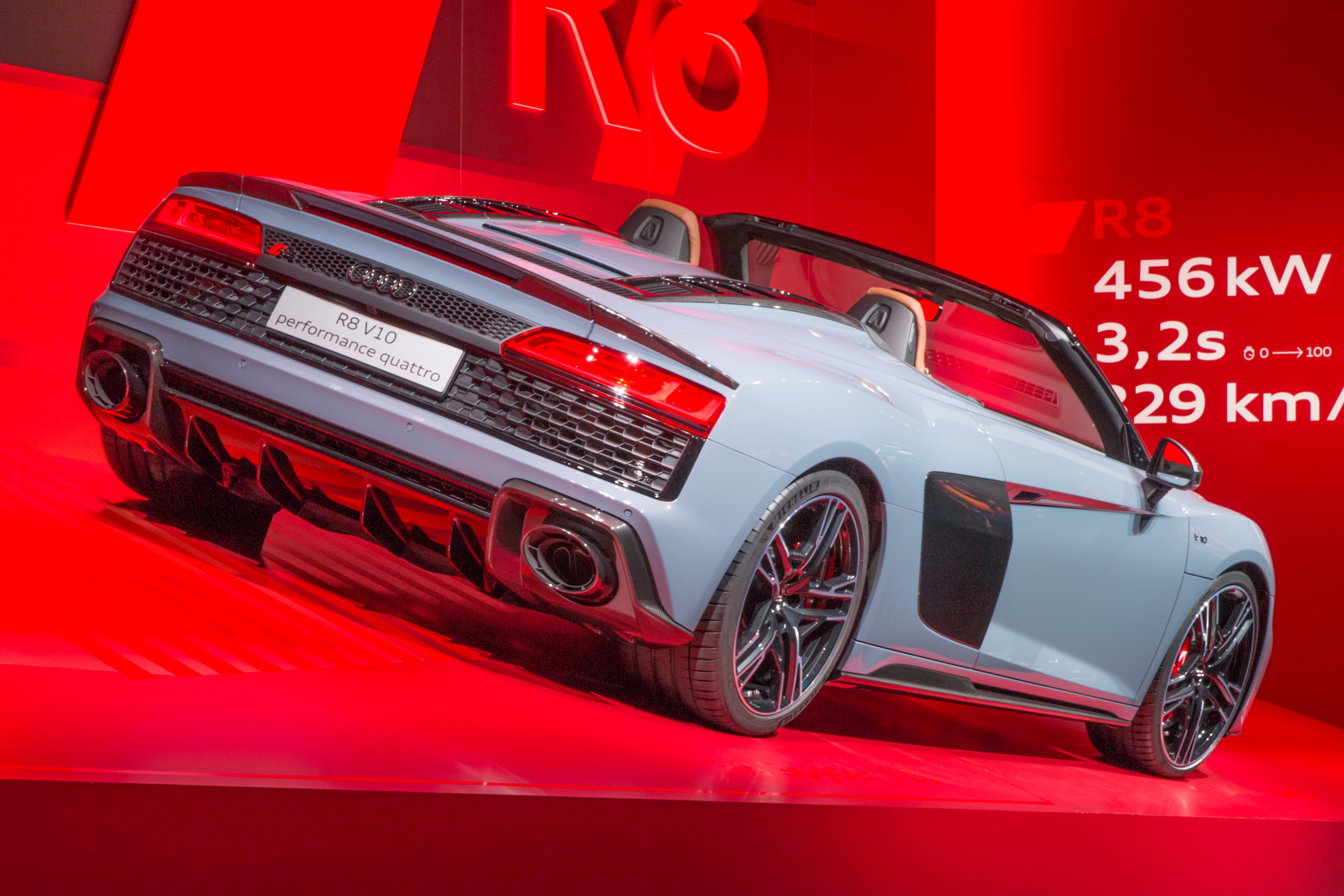
Audi R8 Spyder V10 performance quattro (post facelift)

The R8 received a mid-cycle facelift in October 2018. The base V10 was renamed V10 quattro, while V10 plus was renamed V10 Performance quattro. Engine power increased by 30 PS (22 kW; 30 hp) for the base V10 quattro to 570 PS (562 hp; 419 kW) and the V10 performance quattro saw a power increase by 10 PS (7 kW; 10 hp), now up to 620 PS (612 hp; 456 kW). Other mechanical changes include gasoline particulate filter on all models, the choice of Michelin Pilot Sport Cup 2 tyres, larger carbon-ceramic brakes, and a new steering rack system for a more direct response. A carbon fibre roll bar is also optional which decreases the weight by 2 kg.

Exterior changes included more angular and aggressive styling. The new front bumper of the car has a squared design and winglets on both sides to improve front downforce. The grille was enlarged and now stretched between the headlights. Above the grille, three small horizontal air intakes are present between the headlights for improved airflow harking back to the famous Audi Quattro. Side skirts finished in exposed carbon fibre now flank the sides of the car and at the rear, a single wide grille is now present beneath the taillights joined by an aggressive diffuser and two round dual exhaust tips in exposed and sculptured cut-outs.

The interior was carried over from the outgoing model with new trim options available.

Performance figures include a 0–97 km/h (0–60 mph) acceleration time of 3.5 seconds for the base model and 3.1 seconds for the V10 Performance quattro model. Top speed for the V10 Performance quattro is 330 km/h (205 mph). The facelift model went on sale in Europe in early 2019.

=== Audi R8 RWD ===
Audi announced on 19 November 2019 that the R8 V10 RWD models would become permanent in its lineup. Both R8 Spyder and Coupe models will sport the same 540 PS (533 hp; 397 kW) and 540 N⋅m (398 lb⋅ft) V10 FSI engine used in the limited edition RWS models. Comparing to RWS models, V10 RWD features more aggressive weight reductions. The Coupe is now 65 kg (143 lb) less than its quattro counterpart at 1,595 kg (3,516 lb). The Spyder is now 55 kg (121 lb) less than the quattro Spyder at 1,695 kg (3,737 lb). However, they are 5 kg (11 lb) and 15 kg (33 lb) heavier than the RWS Coupe and Spyder versions respectively. Both models feature a 40:60 weight distribution, similar to the RWS. Despite being a production model, some additional equipment and features are only available to V10 quattro models. The V10 RWD is visually similar to its quattro siblings. The quattro badge on the dashboard is replaced with an RWD badge.

On 7 October 2021, Audi introduced an uprated version for the V10 RWS, named V10 performance RWD. The new model features a slightly detuned engine from the V10 quattro model with the same power of 570 PS (562 hp; 419 kW), but with 10 N⋅m (7 lb⋅ft) less torque at 550 N⋅m (406 lb⋅ft). In addition to a power increase, more performance and handling options from quattro models are made available to the RWD model. These include dynamic steering, carbon fibre stabilizers and ceramic disc brakes. The V10 performance RWD model will replace the less powerful V10 RWD as Audi's only rear-wheel drive R8 offering. The base V10 quattro is also replaced by this model.

=== R8 Coupe GT RWD ===
Announced in October 2022, the R8 GT is a special edition limited to just 333 units that has been lightened and received performance upgrades for better handling and performance.

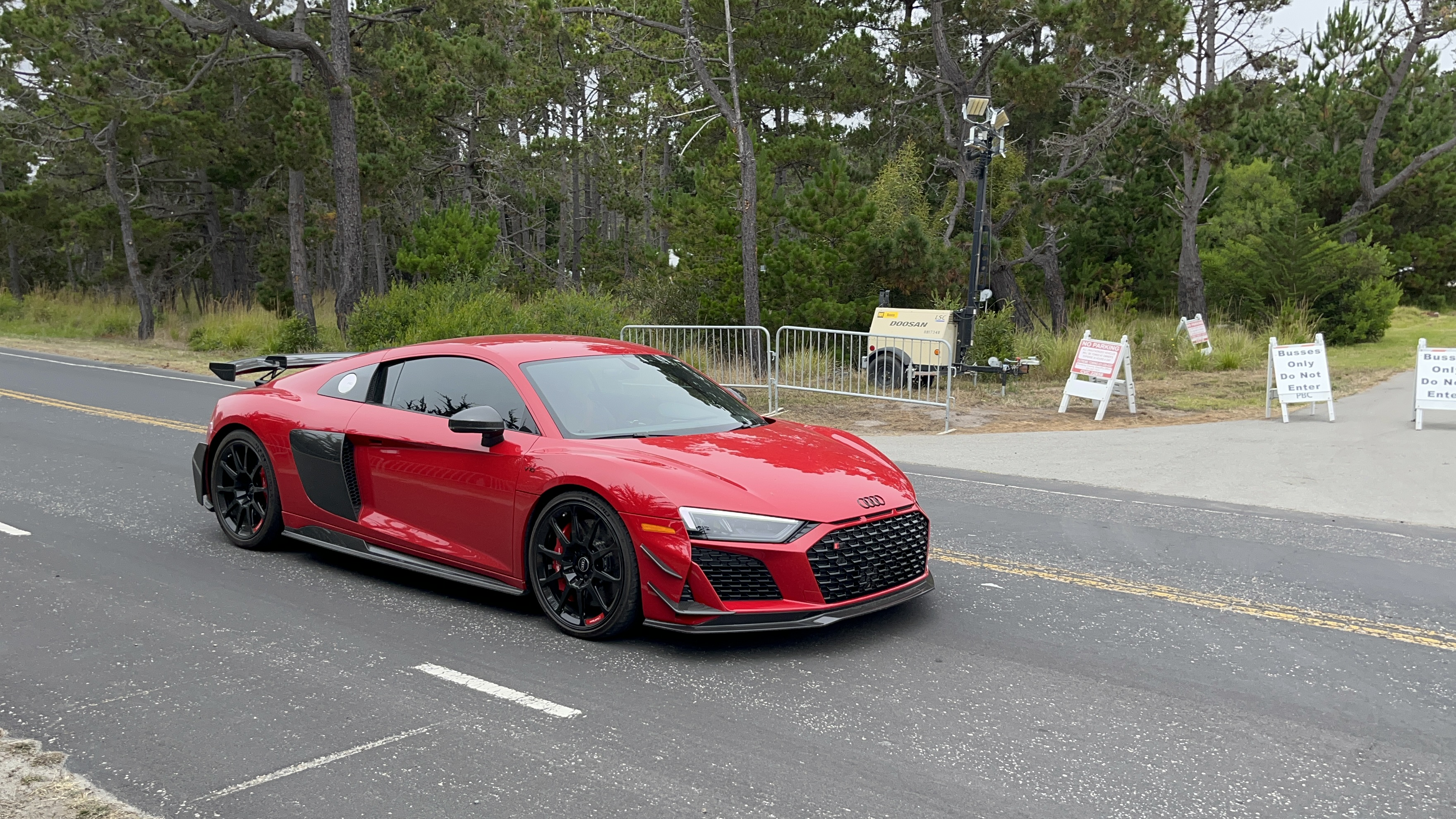

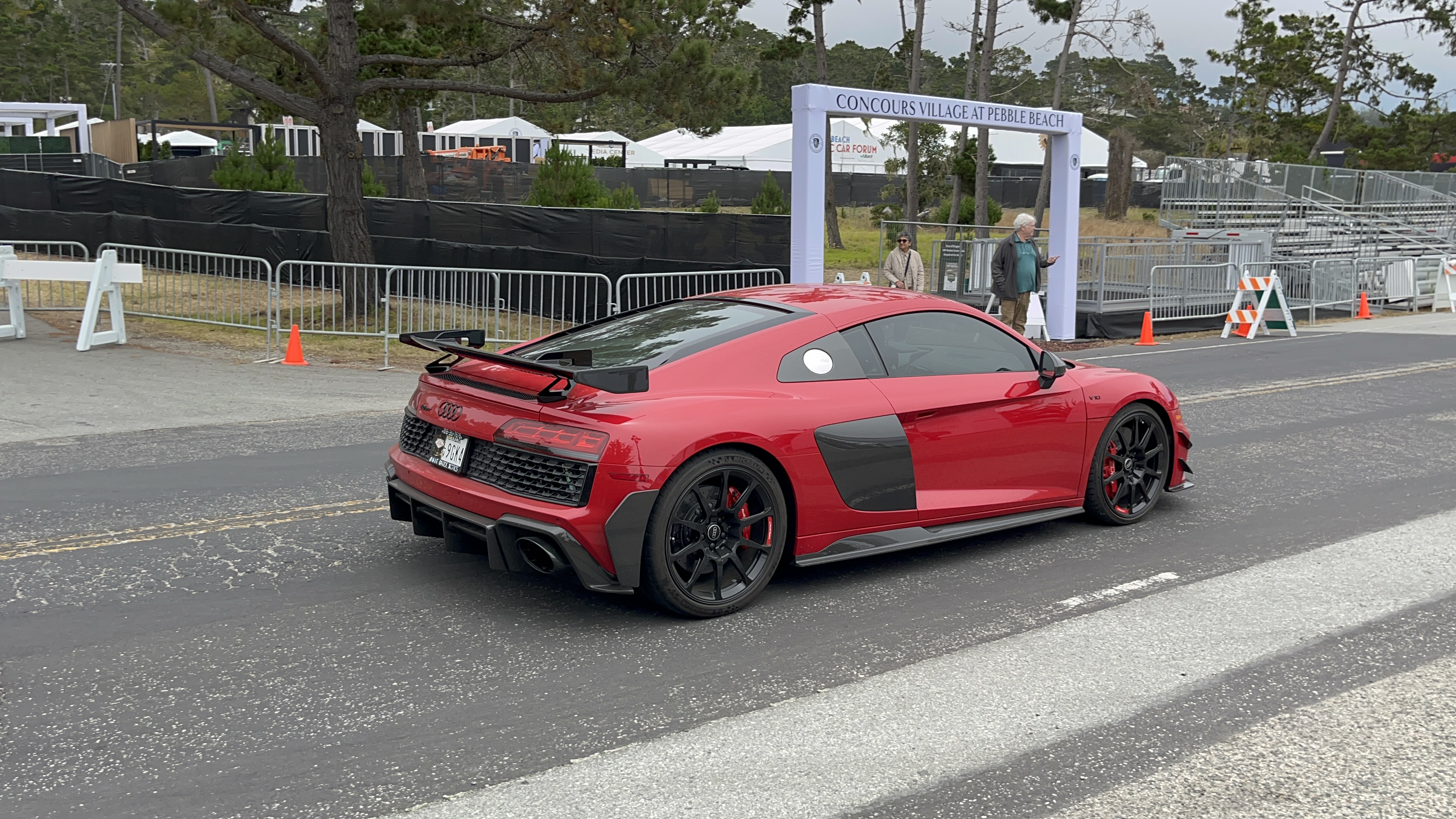

== Special models ==
=== R8 e-tron ===
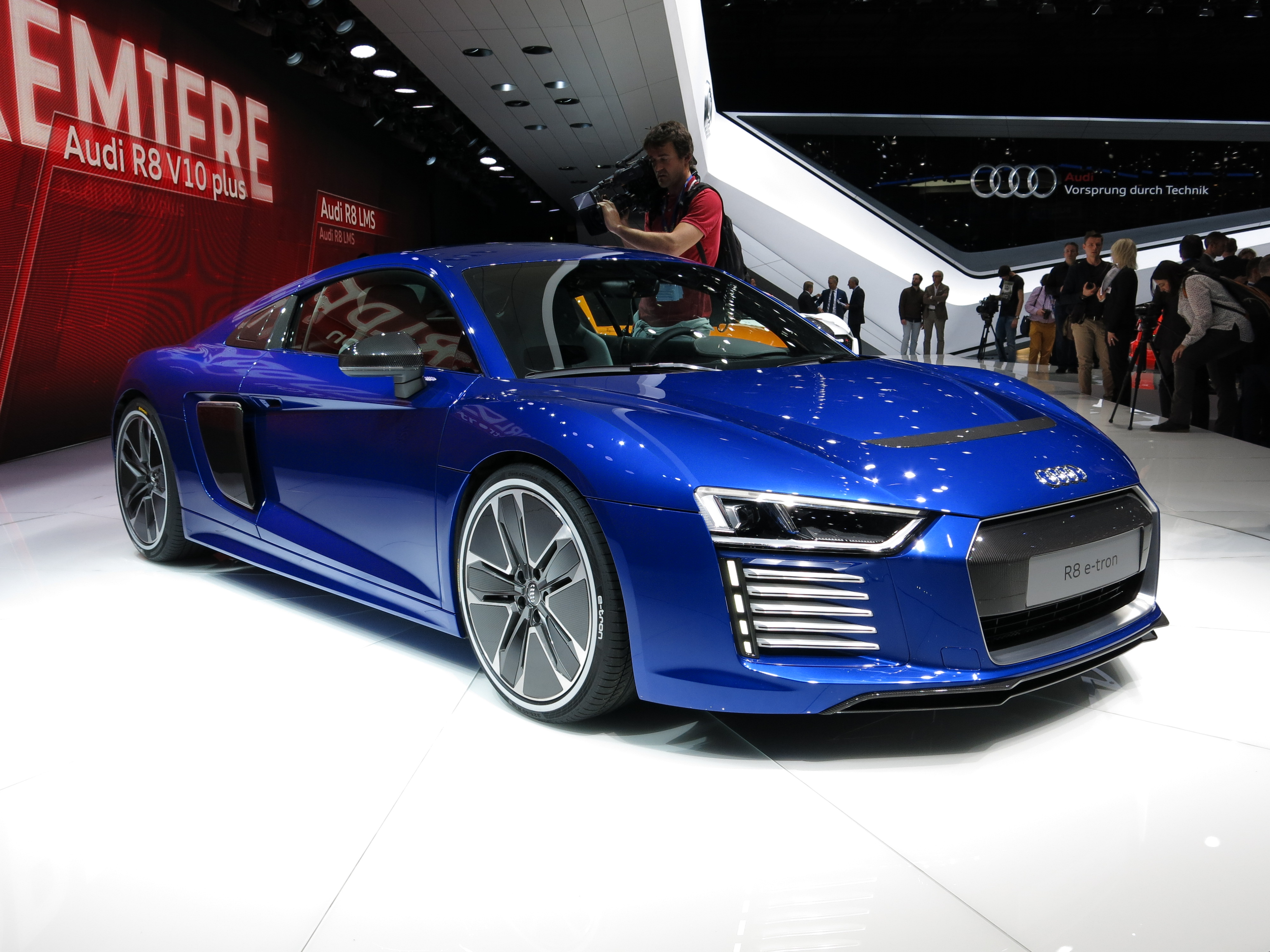
Audi R8 e-tron

The production version of the Audi R8 e-tron was introduced at the 2015 Geneva Motor Show. The limited production electric sports car was available only in Europe. Fewer than 100 units were sold at the end-of-production run.

The R8 e-tron was fitted with two electric motors mounted on the rear wheels having a power output of 462 PS (340 kW; 456 hp) and 919 N⋅m (678 lb⋅ft) of torque. The battery pack consisted of a 92 kWh T-shaped liquid-cooled lithium-ion battery. The e-tron could accelerate from 0–97 km/h (0–60 mph) in 3.9 seconds and could attain a top speed of 160 mph (250 km/h). The e-tron's electric range was 450 km (280 mi) as promised by Audi. The curb weight of the car amounted to 1,780 kg (3,924 lb).

=== R8 Star of Lucis ===
The Audi R8 Star of Lucis is a one-off special edition replica of the car used in the fantasy film Kingsglaive: Final Fantasy XV. Within the Final Fantasy XV universe, the car was developed as a collaboration between Audi and the Royal Art Society of Lucis as a coming-of-age present for Noctis Lucis Caelum, prince of the fictional Kingdom of Lucis. In 2016, Audi launched a raffle for the opportunity to buy the car, however, the car was also displayed and auctioned at the 2019 Tokyo Auto Salon. The car features custom rear spoiler, wheels, and various body panels decorated with symbols associated with the Kingdom of Lucis.

=== R8 Decennium ===
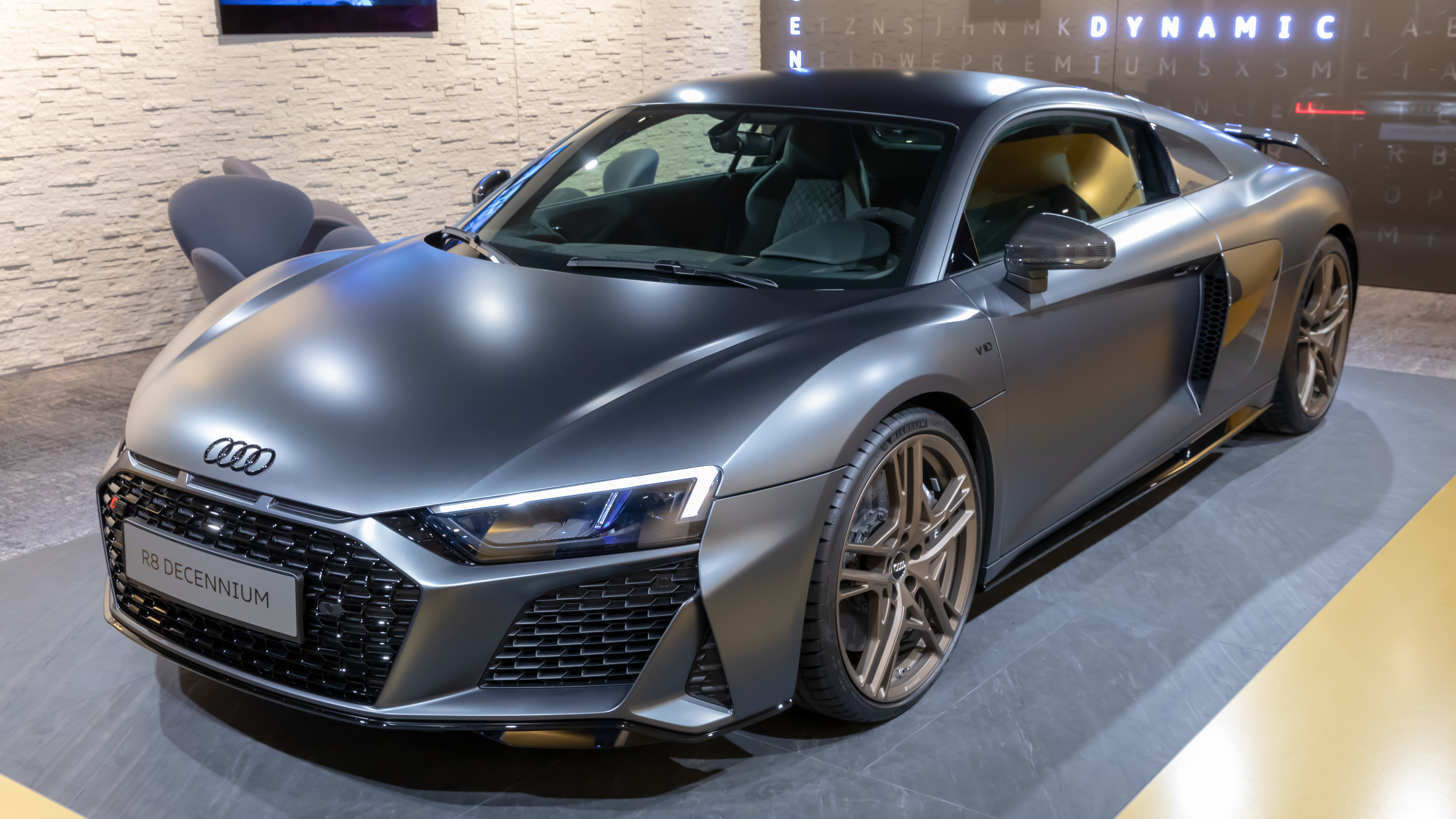
R8 Decennium

Introduced at the 2019 Geneva Motor Show, the R8 Decennium (Latin for "Decade") is a special edition model celebrating ten years of the V10 model of the R8 sports car. The R8 Decennium is based on the R8 V10 performance quattro. Notable changes include 20-inch alloy wheels and engine cover in Bronze finish, aerodynamic elements finished in gloss black, specially developed matte Daytona Grey body colour, black Alcantara/leather interior upholstery with carbon fibre trim and diamond stitching and Decennium badging. The R8 Decennium is limited to 222 units worldwide (50 of which will be imported to the United States) and will only be offered in a coupé bodystyle.

=== R8 V10 Quattro Final Edition ===
To commemorate the conclusion of the standard R8 V10 quattro model, the R8 V10 quattro limited-edition model was announced in July 2020 for the United States market. The model is limited to 30 units, with trim details such as 20-inch milled wheels in silver, carbon exterior lower trim, and alu-optic mirror caps. It also comes with features formerly reserved for the Performance model, such as a carbon fiber front sway bar, magnetic ride, variable ratio steering, and sport exhaust system. The Coupe is offered in Mugello Blue with Pastel Silver interior, Avus Silver with Black interior with red stitching, or Sonoma Green with Black interior with gray stitching, and the Spyder is offered in Mugello Blue with Pastel Silver interior.

=== R8 Panther Edition ===
In December 2020, the R8 Panther Edition was announced to introduce the RWD model line in the United States market. Limited to 30 coupe units as the first of the RWD model's production, the R8 Panther Edition features Panther Black crystal effect paint, 20-inch matte black and red wheels, Audi exclusive black and Crimson red interior, and carbon fiber exterior accents.

== Specifications ==
=== Pre-Facelift (MY 2015–2019) ===
Models	R8 Coupé V10 (2015–2018)	R8 Spyder V10 (2015–2018)	R8 Coupé V10 Plus (2015–2018)	R8 Spyder V10 Plus (2017–2018)	R8 V10 RWS	R8 V10 Spyder RWS	R8 LMS
Engine
Configuration, Displacement	5,204 cc (5.2 L) DOHC FSI V10						
Power at rpm	540 PS (397 kW; 533 hp) at 8,250		610 PS (449 kW; 602 hp) at 8,250		540 PS (397 kW; 533 hp)		585 PS (430 kW; 577 bhp)
Torque at rpm	540 N⋅m (398 lb⋅ft) at 6,500		560 N⋅m (413 lb⋅ft) at 6,500		540 N⋅m (398 lb⋅ft) at 6,500		500 N⋅m (369 lb⋅ft)
CO_{2} emissions	272 g/km	277 g/km	287 g/km	292 g/km	283 g/km	283 g/km (top closed) 286 g/km (top open)	
Performance
0 to 100 km/h (62 mph) (seconds)	3.5	3.6	3.2	3.3	3.7	3.8	3.0
Top speed	319 km/h (198 mph)	317 km/h (197 mph)	330 km/h (205 mph)	328 km/h (204 mph)	320 km/h (199 mph)	318 km/h (198 mph)	299 km/h (186 mph)
Weight
Curb weight	1,695 kg (3,737 lb)	1,795 kg (3,957 lb)	1,645 kg (3,627 lb)	1,695 kg (3,737 lb)	1,590 kg (3,505 lb)	1,680 kg (3,704 lb)	1,225 kg (2,701 lb)

=== Facelift (MY 2019–2024) ===
Models	R8 Coupé V10 quattro (2019–2021)	R8 Spyder V10 quattro (2019–2021)	R8 Coupé V10 performance quattro	R8 Spyder V10 performance quattro	R8 Coupé V10 RWD (MY 2020–2021)	R8 Spyder V10 RWD (MY 2020–2021)	R8 Coupé V10 performance RWD (MY 2022–2024)	R8 Spyder V10 performance RWD (MY 2022–2024)
Engine
Configuration, Displacement	5,204 cc (5.2 L) DOHC FSI V10							
Power at rpm	570 PS (419 kW; 562 hp) at 8,000-8,200		620 PS (456 kW; 612 hp) at 8,000		540 PS (397 kW; 533 hp)		570 PS (419 kW; 562 hp) at 8,000	
Torque at rpm	560 N⋅m (413 lb⋅ft) at 6,200		580 N⋅m (428 lb⋅ft) at 6,600		540 N⋅m (398 lb⋅ft) at 6,500		550 N⋅m (406 lb⋅ft) at 6,400	
CO_{2} emissions	293 g/km	297 g/km	297-299 g/km	304-306 g/km	293-294 g/km	298-299 g/km	294-295 g/km	297-298 g/km
Performance
0 to 100 km/h (62 mph) (seconds)	3.4	3.5	3.1	3.2	3.7	3.8	3.7	3.8
Top speed	324 km/h (201 mph)	322 km/h (200 mph)	331 km/h (206 mph)	329 km/h (204 mph)	320 km/h (200 mph)	318 km/h (198 mph)	329 km/h (204 mph)	327 km/h (203 mph)
Weight
Curb weight	1,685 kg (3,715 lb)	1,795 kg (3,957 lb)	1,650 kg (3,638 lb)	1,775 kg (3,913 lb)	1,595 kg (3,516 lb)	1,695 kg (3,737 lb)	1,590 kg (3,505 lb)	1,695 kg (3,737 lb)

== Motorsport ==
=== R8 LMS (GT3) ===
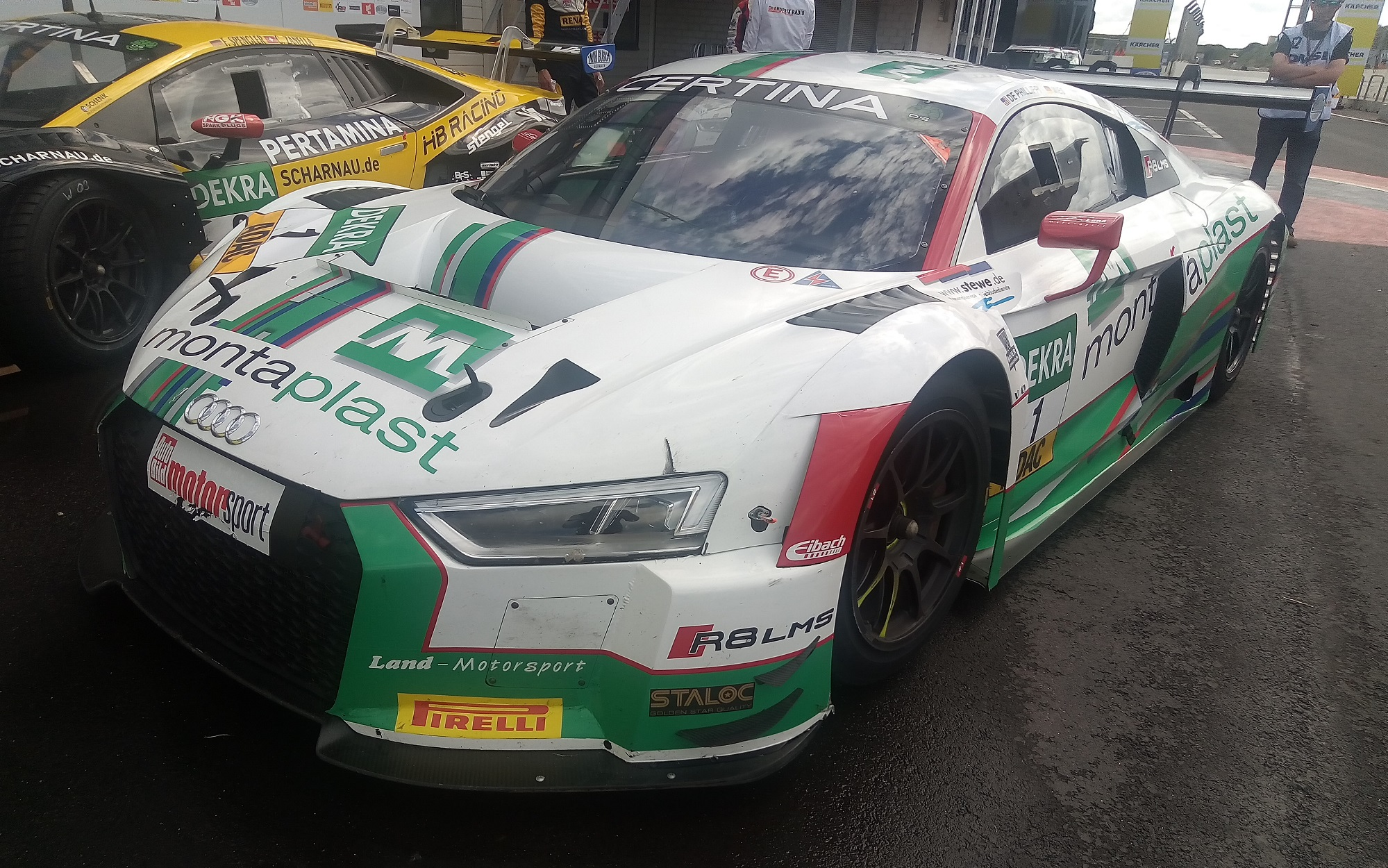
Land Motorsport's Audi R8 LMS

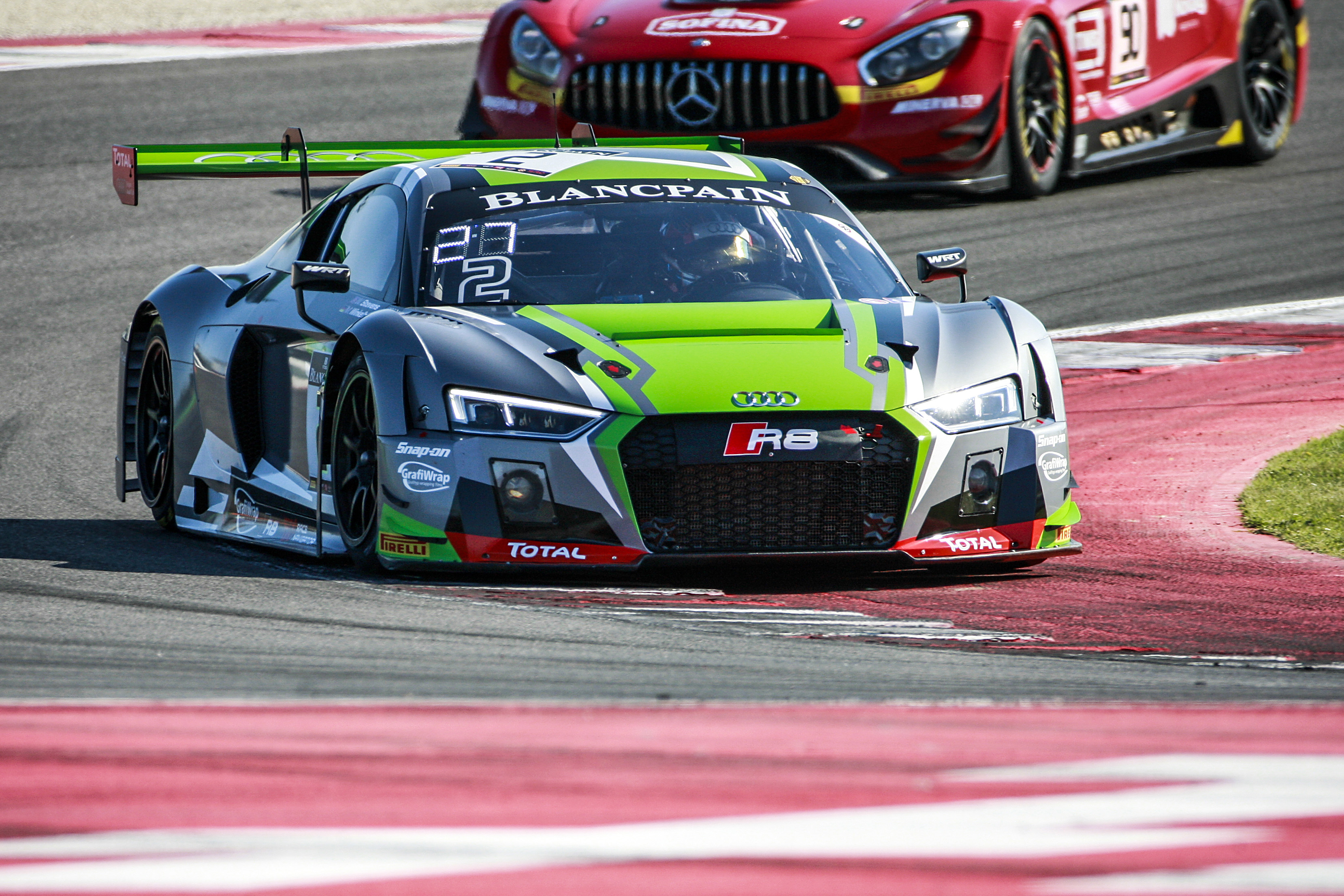
R8 LMS of Audi Sport Team WRT

The Audi R8 LMS is the racing version of the R8. A new race specification V10 engine develops a peak power output of 430 kW (577 hp; 585 PS) (engine code DAR). The removal of the standard all-wheel-drive system and the intelligent mix of materials such as aluminum in the Audi Space Frame (ASF), a structural CFRP component and the steel roll cage alone make the chassis about 30 kg (66 lb) lighter, now weighing 252 kg (556 lb). At the same time, the torsional stiffness of the stressed frame has increased by 39 percent. These weight-saving measures result in a weight of just 1,225 kg (2,701 lb). Aside from that, the car packs many safety features such as a modified spaceframe structure at the front and a carbon fibre crash element at the rear protect the driver in a crash, the special PS1 racing seat from the Audi R18 e-Tron Quattro which has been known to set the safety standards for LMP1 cars is used for additional safety and is connected directly to the chassis for increased stiffness. A quickly adjustable foot lever system and a height and length adjustable safety steering column allow versatile adjustment to various drivers. A rescue opening in the roof as used in DTM race touring cars is implemented in the R8 LMS GT3, a first for any GT3 car, after an accident, it allows the driver's helmet to be lifted in a way that avoids straining the spinal column.

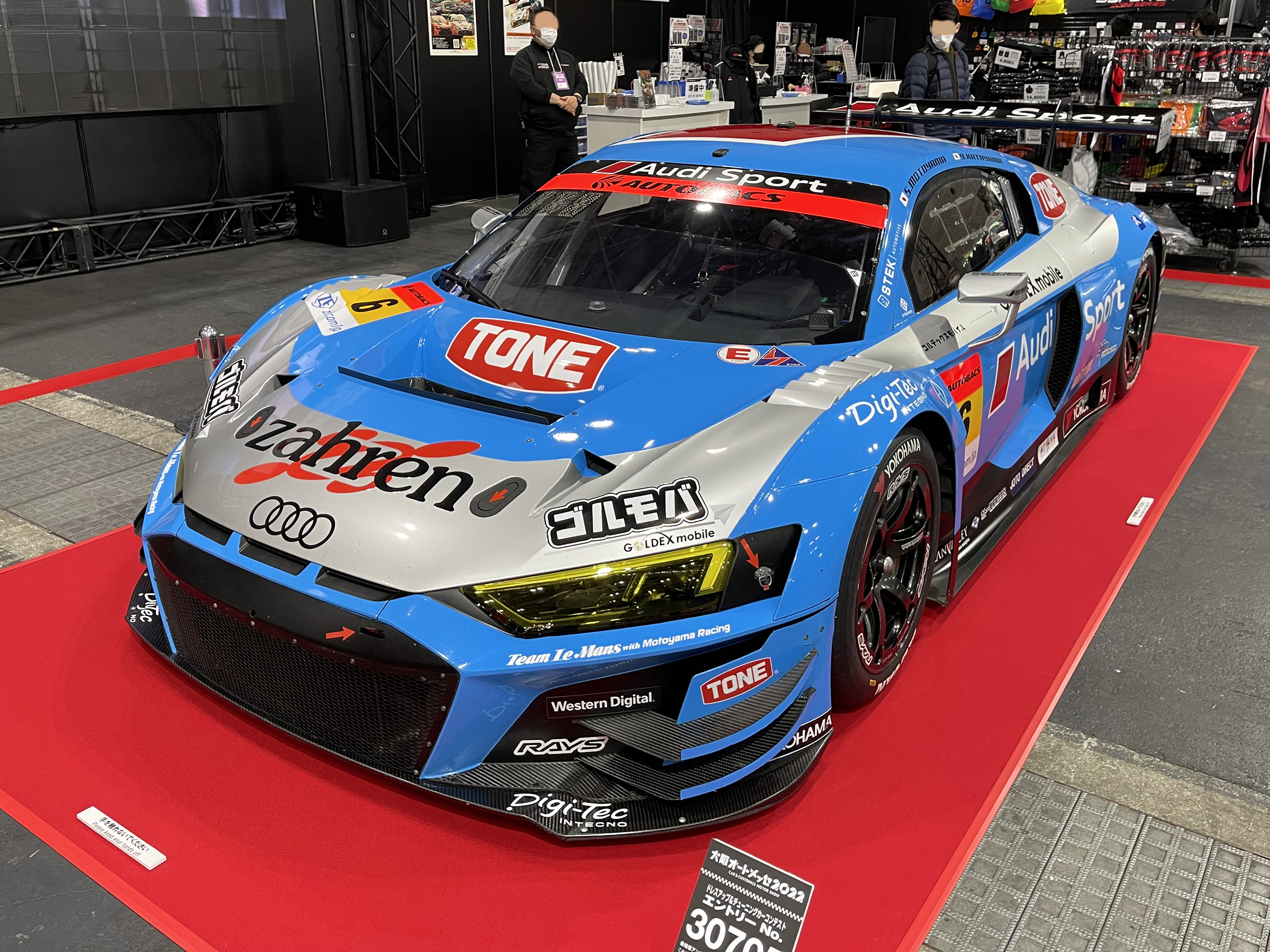
R8 LMS Evo of Audi Sport Team LeMans at the 2022 Osaka Auto Messe

Although the combination of the materials in the R8 LMS is more complex, Audi has managed to integrate the manufacturing process for production and race cars even more closely than before. In a new manufacturing facility at the Bollinger Hofe industrial park in Heilbronn, Quattro GmbH produces both variants in combination. Although the race car, for example, is fitted with aluminum cast joints and a steel roll cage the racing chassis of the R8 LMS remains integrated into the basic production process up to and including the stages of the roof assembly and cathodic dip painting (CDP), which is a form of priming. Following these production steps, the race cars are completed in Heilbronn-Biberach. The new aerodynamic concept of the Audi R8 LMS for the first time includes a fully lined underfloor and a conceptually integrated rear diffuser. As a result, the dimensions of the rear wing can be reduced without a corresponding increase of aerodynamic drag. The wheel arches, which are open rearwards via a larger cross-section, contribute to improved airflow. The airflow rate and cooling area of the radiator at the front have increased by ten percent to handle maximum outside air temperatures. In order to improve the race drivers' ability to concentrate on their tasks, fresh air circulation in the cockpit has been improved. At a speed of 200 km/h (124 mph), the airflow rate is 250 litres per second. Audi has achieved these improvements despite the significantly higher constraints imposed on aerodynamics design by the 2016 regulations.

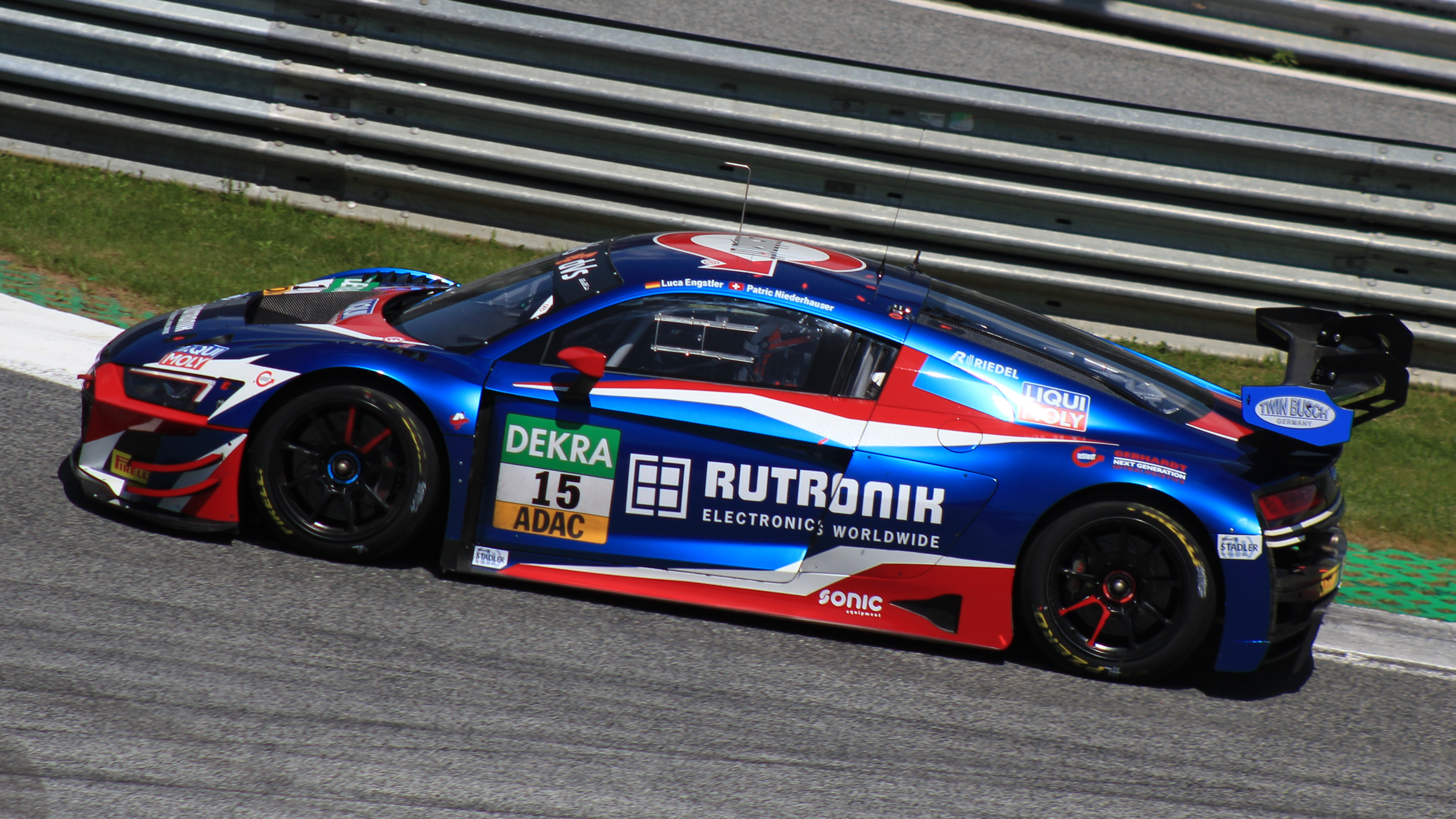
R8 LMS II of Rutronik Racing

The Audi R8 LMS Evo was unveiled in 2018 ahead of the 2019 season. The car saw new bodywork, including a new front splitter to improve downforce, and an improved gearbox. The car was available for customers to buy as new, or as an evo kit for pre-existing Audi R8 LMS models.

In 2021 Audi Sport revealed the Audi R8 LMS Evo II, which saw improved Aerodynamics, engine characteristics, air conditioning, suspension and traction control. The car is available to buy as new, or as an upgrade kit for a previous generation Audi R8 LMS.

=== R8 LMS (GT4) ===
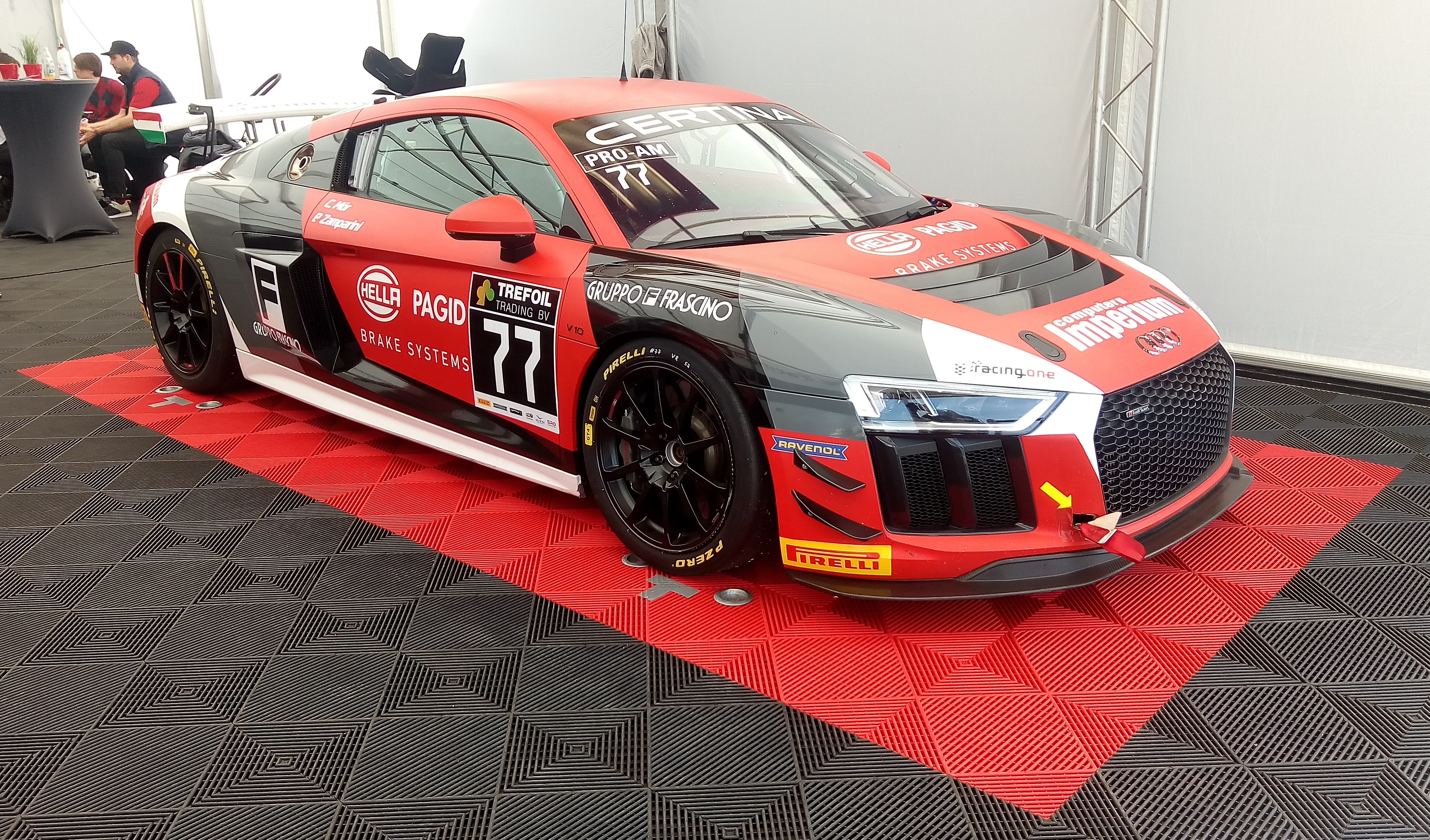
Team Racing One's Audi R8 LMS GT4

Audi Sport introduced a version of the R8 for GT4-class racing at the 2017 New York International Auto Show held in April. The GT4's 5.2-litre V10 engine is rated at a maximum power output of 496 PS (365 kW; 489 hp) and 550 N⋅m (406 lb⋅ft) of torque. Like the LMS GT3, the GT4 also uses a rear-wheel-drive drive layout. Performance figures include a 0–97 km/h (0–60 mph) acceleration time of 3 seconds and a top speed of 250 km/h (155 mph) depending on racing conditions. The car has a dry weight of 1,460 kg (3,219 lb). The GT4 is eligible to compete in 13 worldwide racing series and is designed to be an entry-level racing model for amateur racing drivers.

=== R8 LMS (GT2) ===
The Audi R8 LMS GT2 was unveiled by Audi at the 2019 Goodwood festival of speed. The car has features a high-performance engine with 640 hp, making it the most powerful car in the history of Audi customer racing. The car is eligible to compete in any series featuring the SRO GT2 class. The car has seen a lot of success, including an overall win at the 2022 24 hours of Zolder. In 2023, a road legal version of the R8 LMS GT2 was creating by German racing team and tuner Abt Sportsline, called the XGT.

=== Motorsports history ===
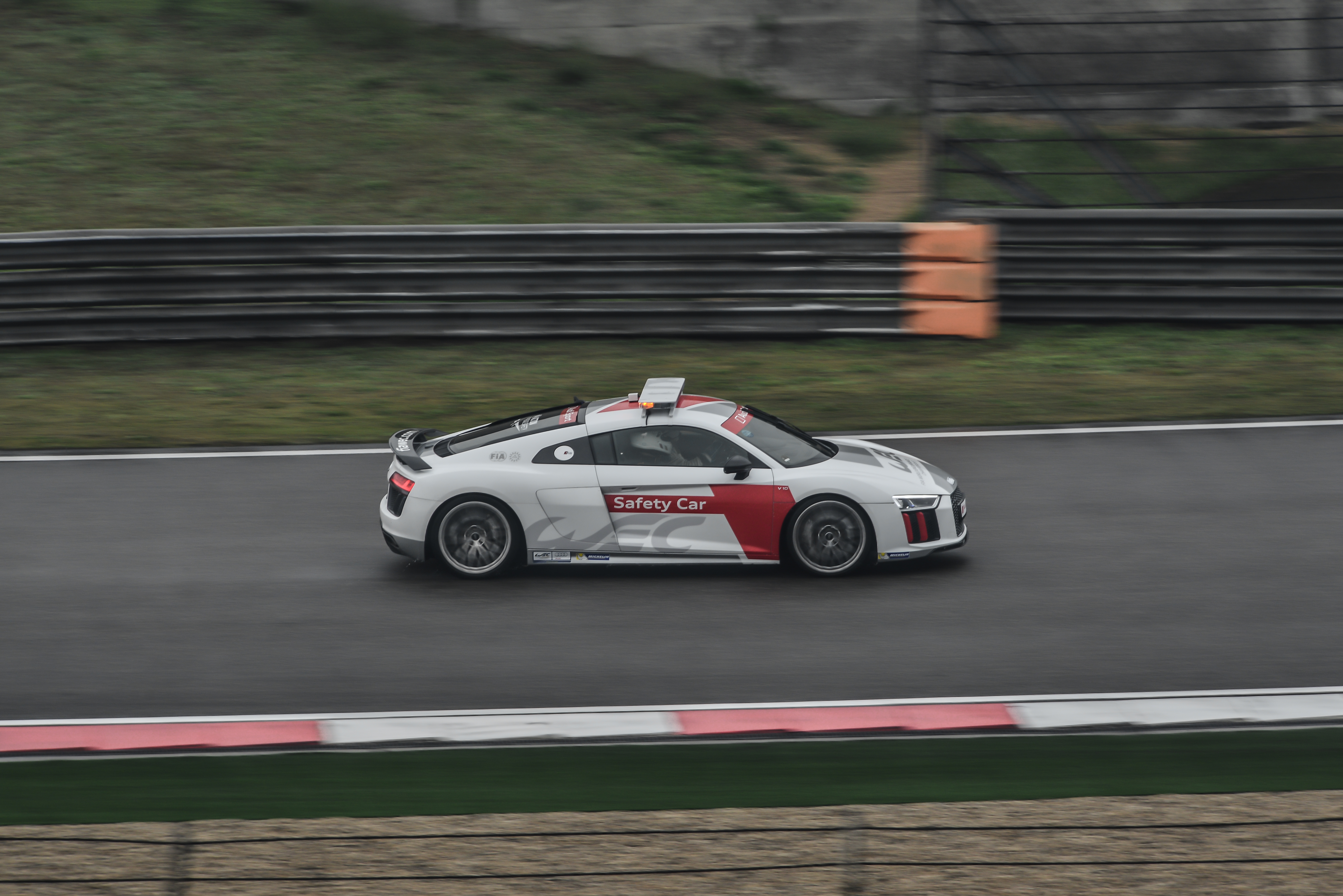
Audi R8 WEC Safety Car

The Audi R8 has been used as a safety car for the Deutsche Tourenwagen Masters and British Superbike Championship racing series as well as the FIA World Endurance Championship and the 24 Hours of Le Mans.

The Audi R8 LMS won the 2018 Bathurst 12 hour race.

== Reception ==
The Type 4S received generally positive reviews from the motoring press. Australian automotive publication Car Advice praised its daily usability along with its modern design and technology but criticised the lack of a manual transmission and an affordable V8 model. British magazine Autocar tested the standard V10 FSI coupé and praised its naturally aspirated engine and agile handling. However, the publication favoured the high performance Plus variant more stating that the cost difference between the Plus and the standard model with options was simply too slim. The publication gave the verdict: "Audi sends its mid-engined flagship in search of supercar scalps, and largely succeeds - even if rivals like the Porsche 911 Turbo provide greater driving limits." US automotive magazine Car & Driver tested the V10 plus and praised the aggressive design language with less radical "sideblades" along with quick acceleration and the engine noise but criticised the unavailability of some features on the US market cars such as magnetorheological dampers and laser headlamps.
