= Toyota GR GT =

Japanese sports car / grand tourer

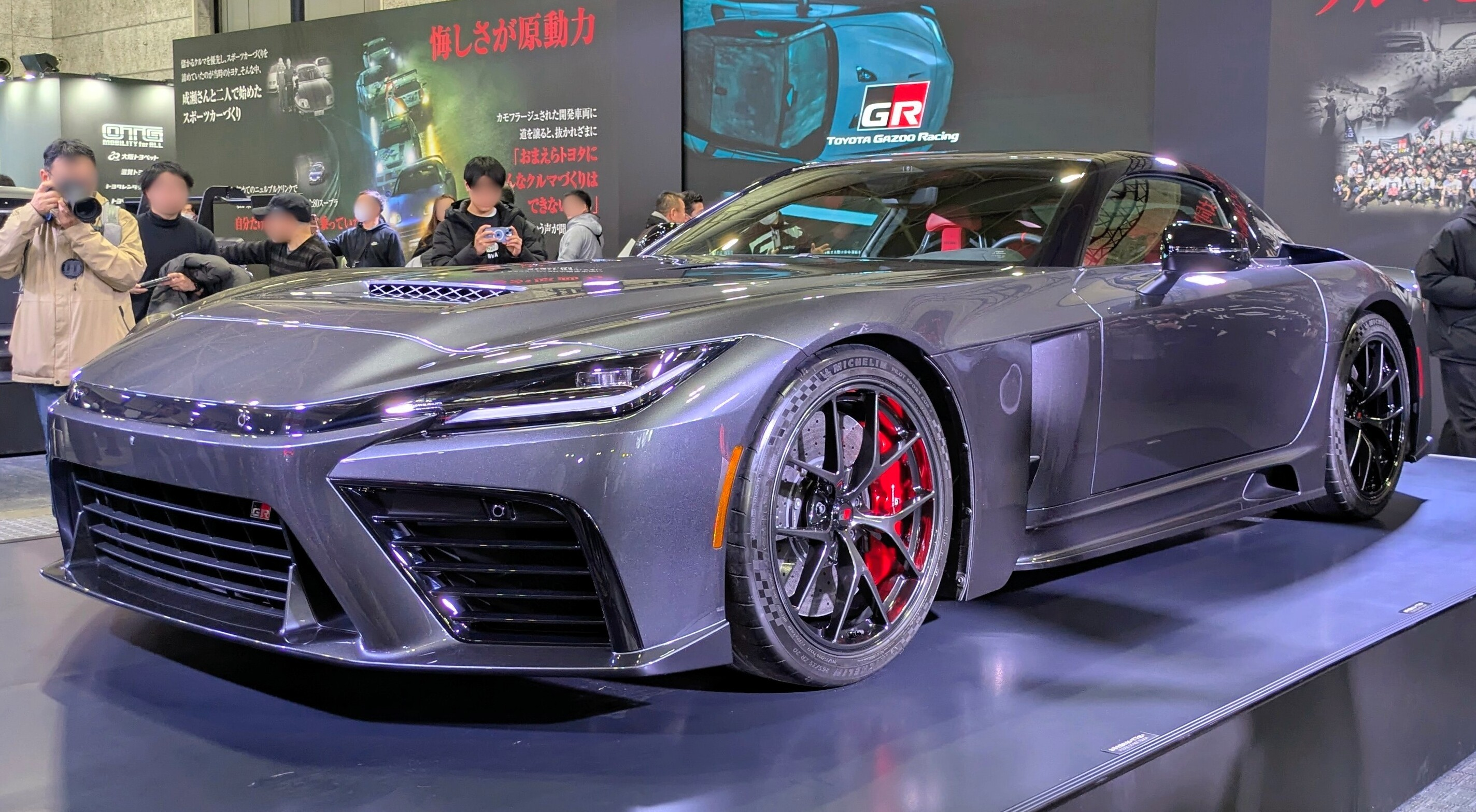
- Toyota GR GT Prototype

Overview
- Manufacturer: Toyota
- Production: 2027 (to commence)
- Model years: 2027 (planned)
- Assembly: Japan
- Designer: Takashi Doi

Body and chassis
- Class: Sports car/grand tourer (S)
- Body style: 2-door coupe
- Layout: Front mid-engine, rear-wheel-drive
- Chassis: Aluminium space frame
- Related: Lexus LFA Concept

Powertrain
- Engine: Petrol hybrid: 4.0 L G40E twin-turbo V8
- Electric motor: Transaxle-integrated single-motor
- Power output: 650 PS (478 kW; 641 hp) (combined system output)
- Transmission: 8-speed automatic
- Hybrid drivetrain: Parallel

Dimensions
- Wheelbase: 2,725 mm (107.3 in)
- Length: 4,820 mm (189.8 in); 4,785 mm (188.4 in) (GR GT3)
- Width: 2,000 mm (78.7 in); 2,050 mm (80.7 in) (GR GT3)
- Height: 1,195 mm (47.0 in); 1,190 mm (46.9 in) (GR GT3)
- Kerb weight: 1,750 kg (3,858 lb)

The Toyota GR GT, officially branded simply as GR GT, is an upcoming sports car/grand tourer (S-segment) to be produced by Toyota under the Gazoo Racing (GR) brand with production starting in 2027. It was previewed by the GR GT3 Concept unveiled at the January 2022 Tokyo Auto Salon. The camouflaged road-going version and its racing variant debuted at the Goodwood Festival of Speed in July 2025, and was fully unveiled at its world premiere on 5 December 2025. In the United States, the car will be available in select Lexus dealerships instead of Toyota dealerships.

== History ==
Toyota teased the GR GT3 concept and other GR performance vehicles on 7 January 2022, and was unveiled at the 2022 Tokyo Auto Salon as a preview of the GT3 racing class and a possible road going GT variant for homologation use. They hoped to make a working prototype by the end of 2022.

In September 2022, Toyota filed the GR GT3 concept into patents without the rear wing indicating that production for road use and homologation for the race track could happen.

In March 2023, a GR GT3 prototype was spotted test driving in the Fuji Speedway race track, while the road going GR GT was spotted testing on the streets in October 2024.

In January 2024, Toyota filed a trademark of the name "GR GT", confirming the introduction of a flagship sports car / grand tourer.

In the July 2025 Goodwood Festival of Speed, the GR GT prototype and the GR GT3 prototype made their public debut in a camouflaged appearance. In October 2025, Toyota teased the GR GT along with their past performance vehicles: the 2000GT and the Lexus LFA.

In November 2025, an advertisement featuring the 2000GT, the LFA and the GR GT was shown racing in a speedway confirming the reveal date of 5 December 2025 and the car without its camouflaged appearance.

In December 2025, Toyota held a world premiere event announcing the GR GT, the GR GT3 race car and the related battery electric LFA Concept. The GR GT and GR GT3 made its first autoshow debut at the 2026 Tokyo Auto Salon.

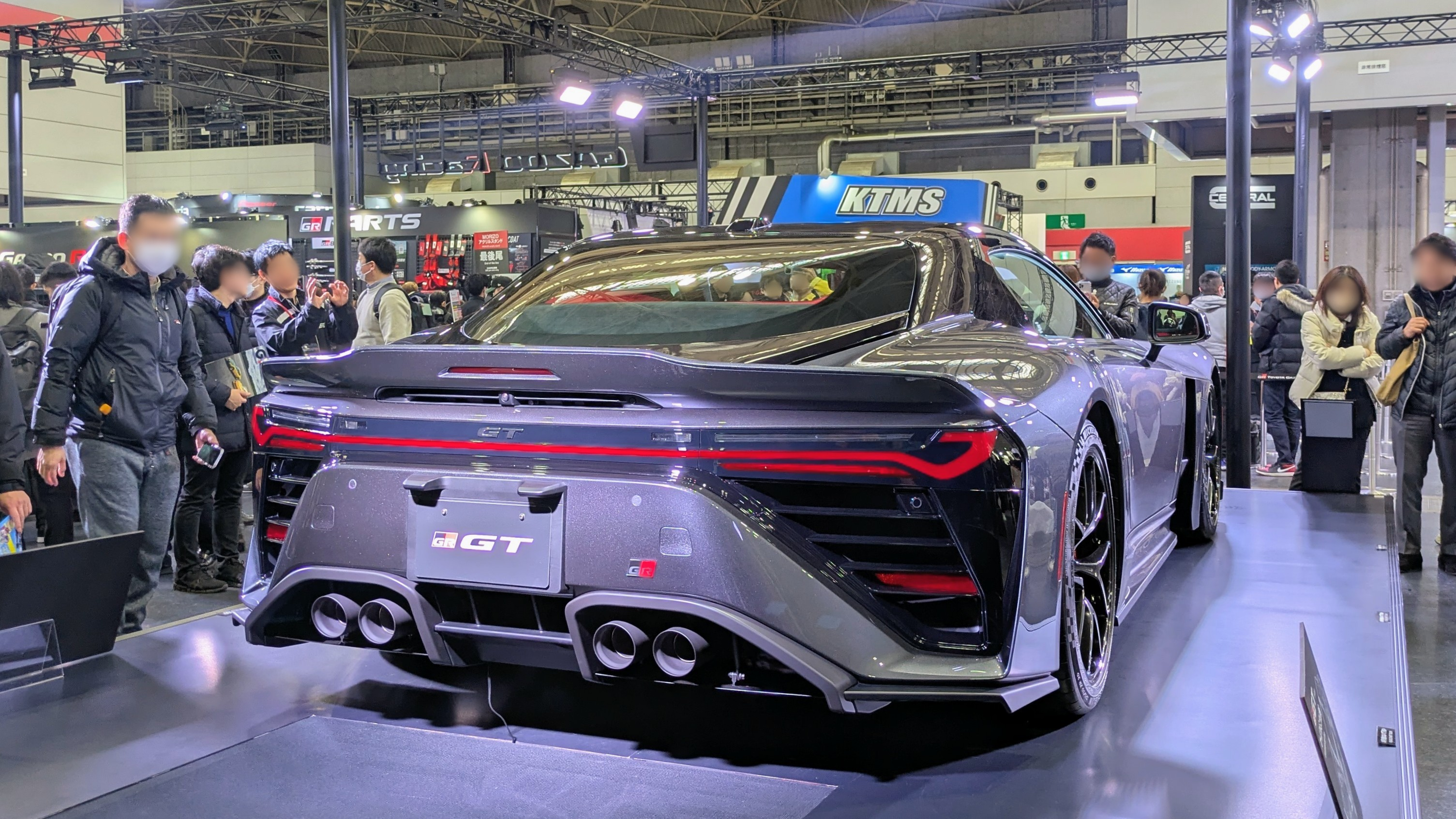
GR GT Prototype rear view

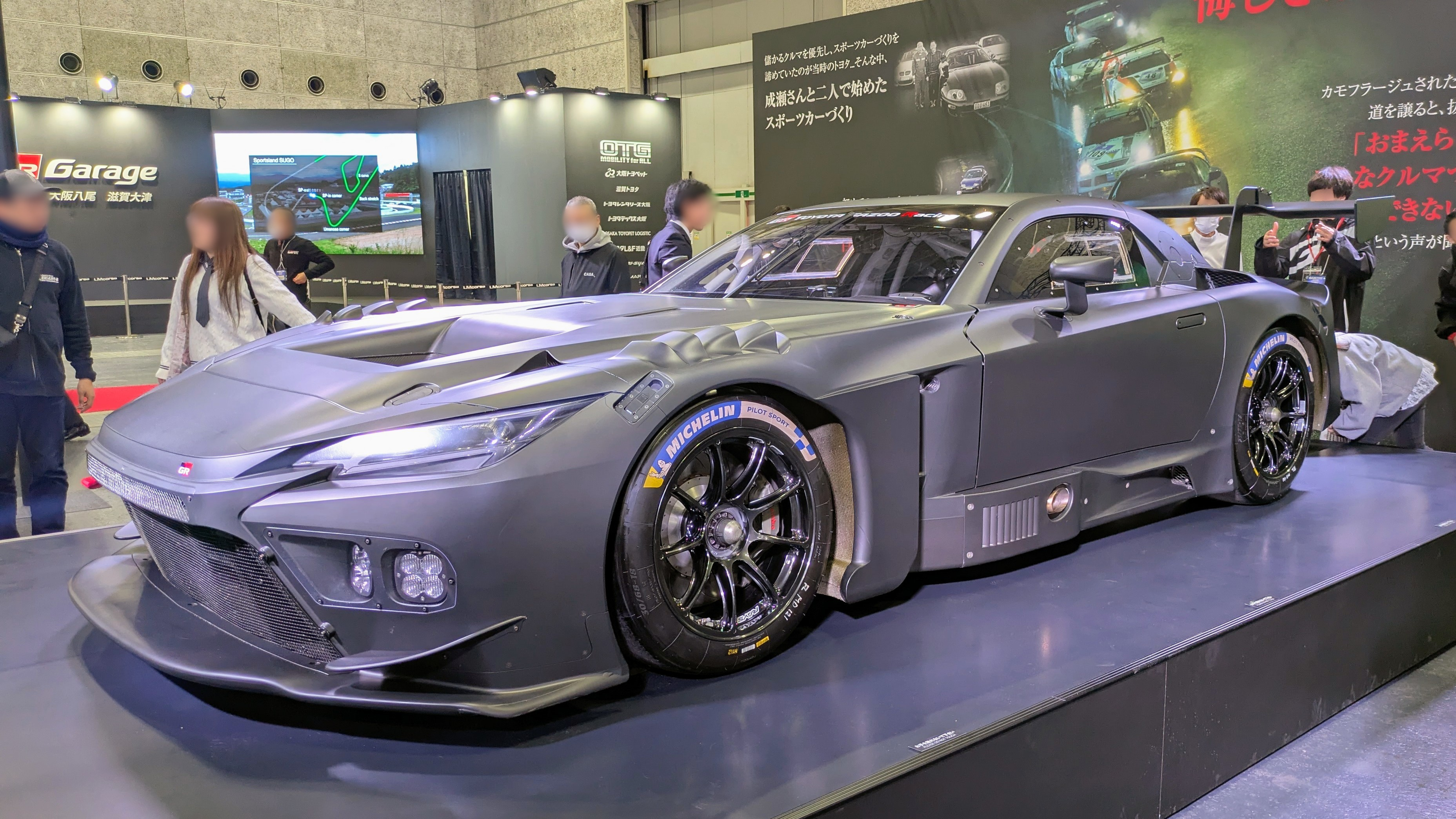
GR GT3 Prototype

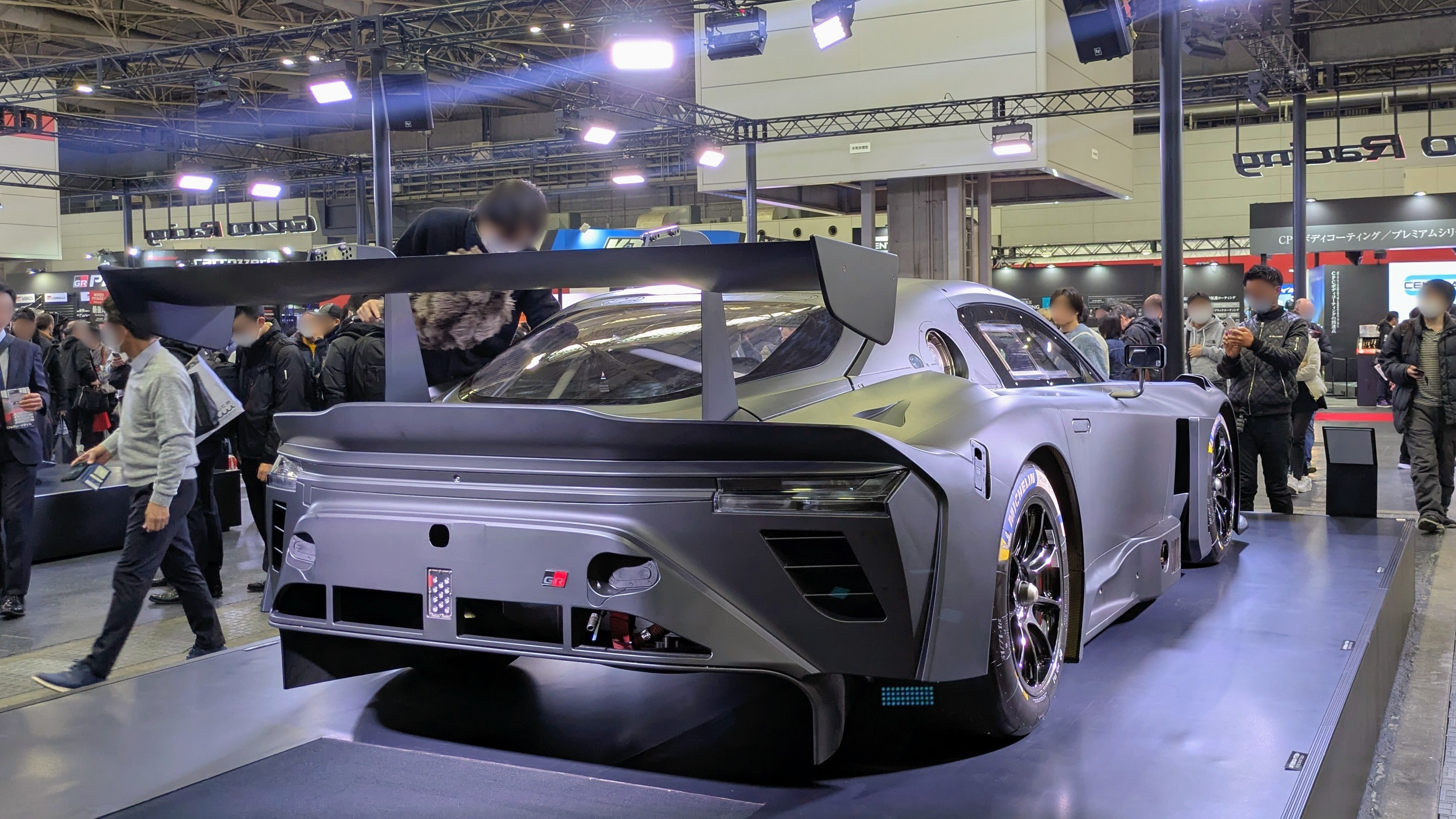
GR GT3 Prototype rear view

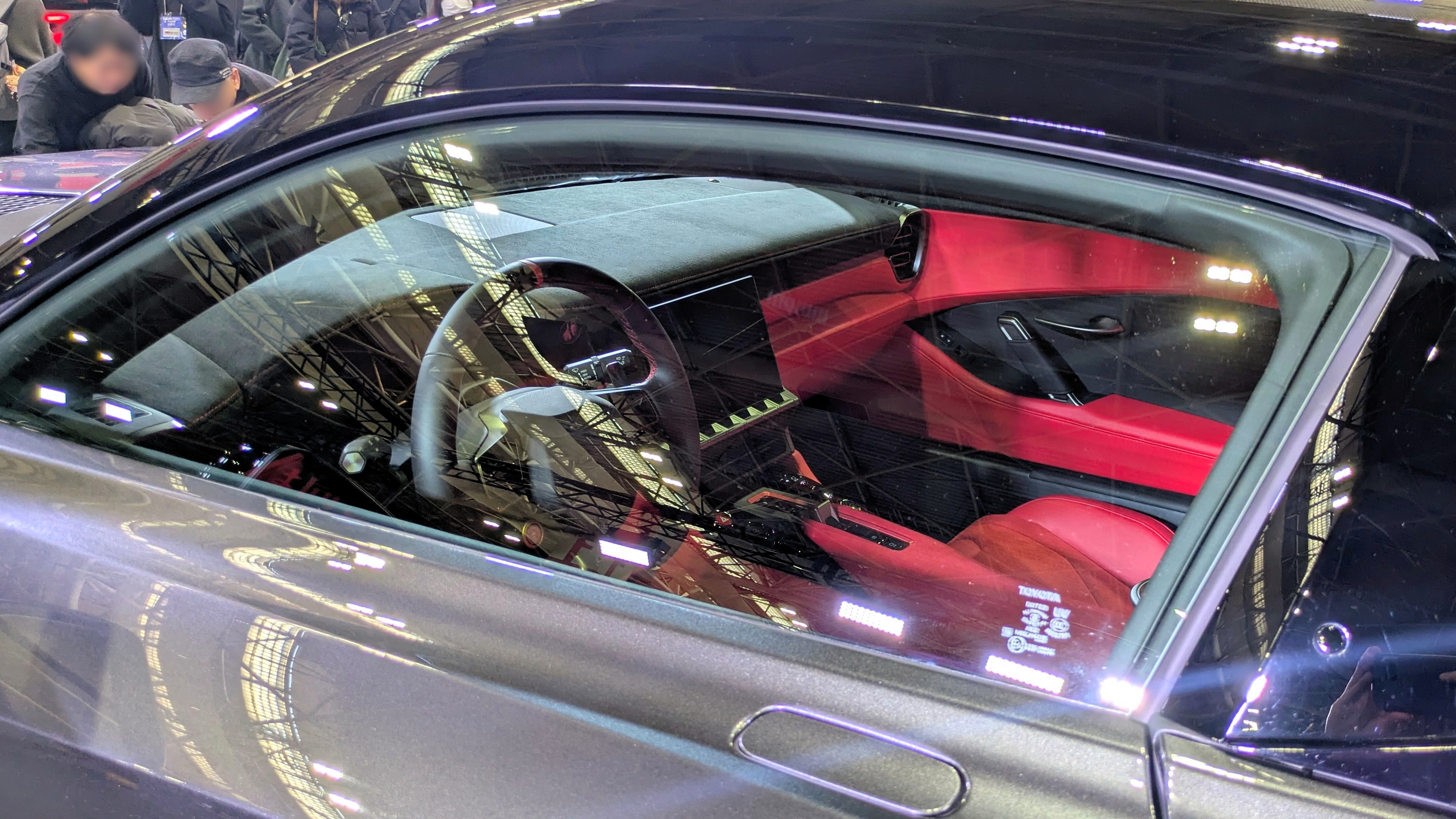
GR GT interior

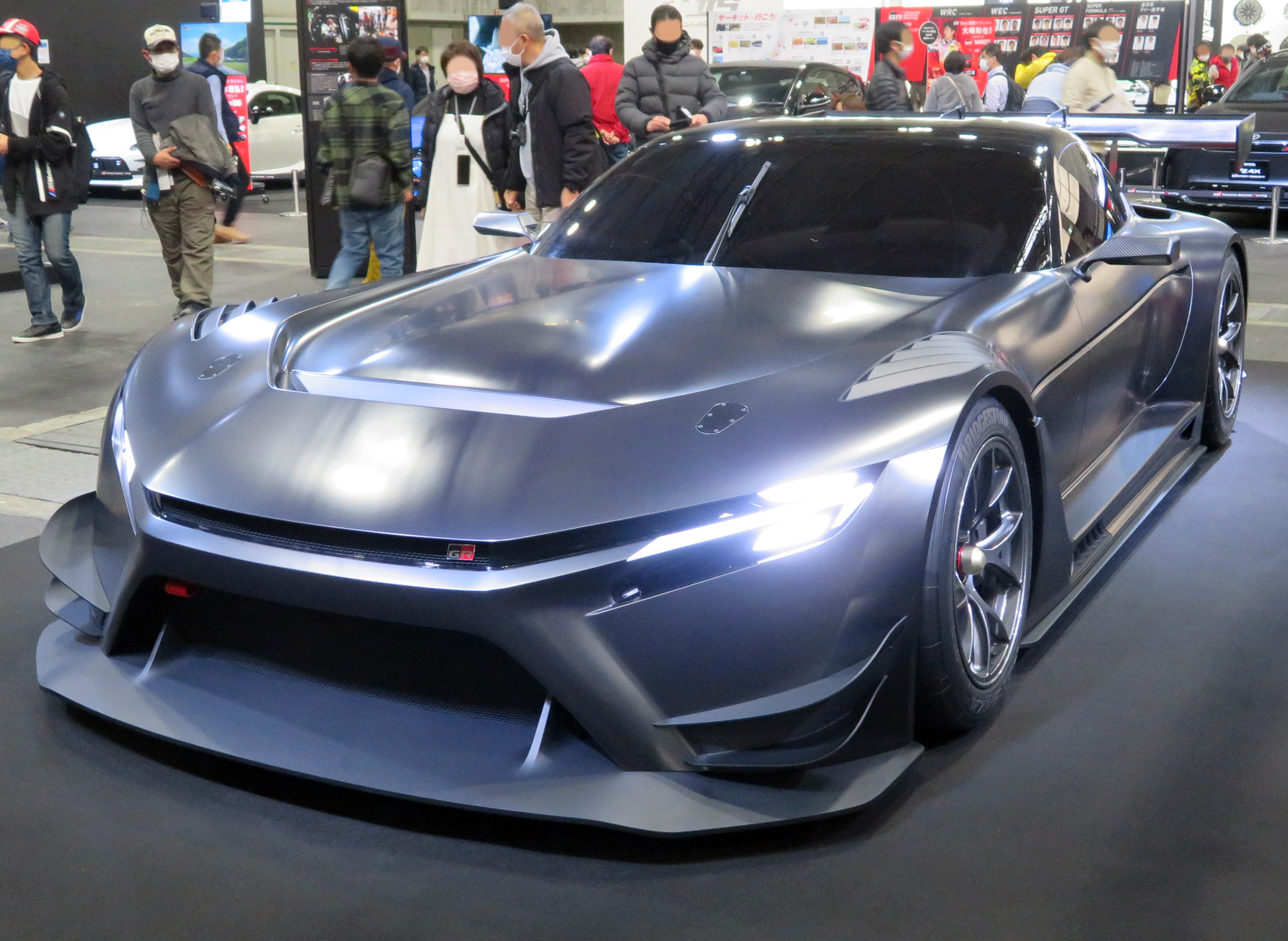
GR GT3 Concept, which previewed the GR GT3

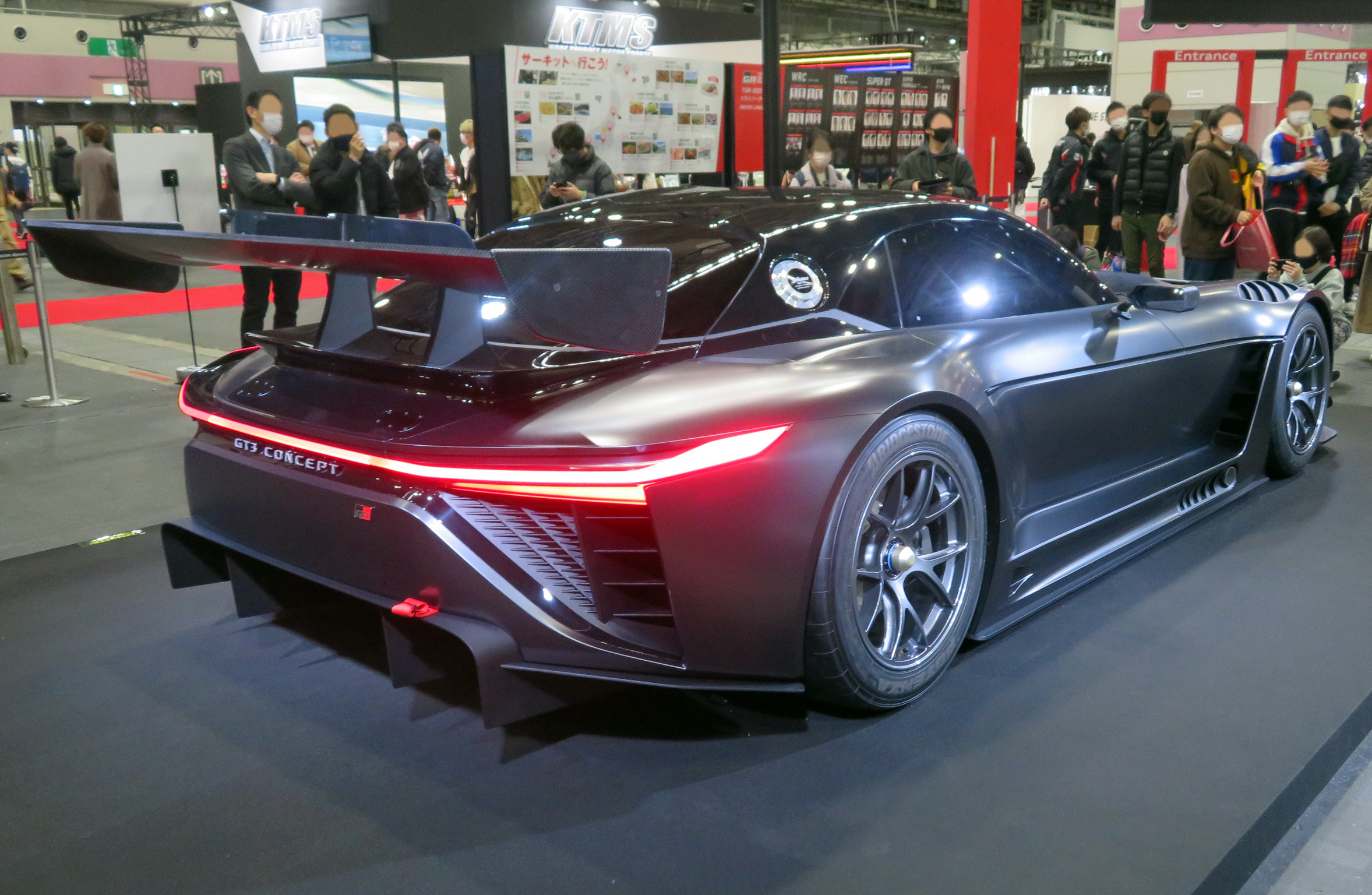
GR GT3 Concept rear view

== Overview ==
=== Engine and drivetrain ===
The GR GT is powered by Toyota's first 90-degree bank angle 3,998 cc (4.0 L; 244.0 cu in) G40E twin-turbocharged V8 engine equipped with transaxle-integrated single-motor hybrid system with a maximum system output of 650 PS (478 kW; 641 hp) and maximum torque output of 850 N⋅m (627 lb⋅ft). The engine was developed with a design concept of being "thoroughly compact and light" in order to achieve the car's "low overall height and low centre of gravity" package. In addition to reducing the engine's overall height with a bore and stroke of 87.5 mm × 83.1 mm (3.4 in × 3.3 in), it also uses a "hot vee" configuration with two turbochargers within the bank, a port and direct-injection system, a dry sump lubrication system and a thinner oil pan. The power generated by the engine is transmitted to the rear transaxle via a torque tube made of carbon fibre reinforced plastic (CFRP). The transaxle integrates a motor–generator, a newly developed rear-mounted eight-speed automatic transmission using a "wet start clutch" (WSC) that eliminates the torque converter and a mechanical limited-slip differential, and outputs power directly to the tyres. The adoption of a rear transaxle and optimal placement of heavy items such as the drive battery and fuel tank resulted in a front-to-rear weight distribution of 45:55.

=== Chassis ===
The GR GT utilises an all-aluminium space frame, which is the first for a Toyota vehicle. Large hollow aluminium castings are placed in the main parts of the frame, and a claimed high rigidity is achieved through "optimal component placement and joining techniques," including aluminium extrusions. In addition to aluminium, CFRP is also used for the body panels, such as the bonnet, roof and rear bulkhead, resulting a total car weight of 1,750 kg (3,858 lb).

=== Suspension, tyres and brakes ===
The GR GT's newly designed front and rear suspensions employed low-mounted double wishbone systems with forged aluminium arms. The suspension geometrics were developed from scratch, which Toyota says focusing on linear response and high controllability. The standard tyres fitted are Michelin Pilot Sport Cup 2, which were developed specifically for the car. The brakes use carbon ceramic discs manufactured by Brembo. The car's electronic stability control allows for multiple levels of adjustment of drive force and brake control.

=== Exterior ===
The GR GT has an overall length of 4,820 mm (189.8 in), while its wheelbase measures 2,725 mm (107.3 in), with a low height of 1,195 mm (47.0 in) and a width of 2,000 mm (78.7 in). Its design was developed under the "aerodynamics first" concept. With the car's claimed top speed of over 320 km/h (199 mph), aerodynamic performance was given the priorities. In contrast to typical production car development, the exterior design is decided second, following the consideration of aerodynamic efficiency and cooling performance. Aerodynamic engineers who worked on cars competing in the FIA World Endurance Championship (WEC) were also involved in the GR GT's development, and after extensive discussions with the exterior designers, the vehicle packaging was determined based on an "aerodynamic model," a model representing the ideal form proposed by the aerodynamic design team. The car lacks the Toyota badging, emphasising its position as a pure GR product.

=== Interior ===
The interior design of the GR GT claimed importance on the driving position and visibility, aiming to "create an optimal design that is suitable for both professional and individual drivers, as well as for both circuit and daily use". The driving position was designed for ease of operation in mind, placing driving-related switches near the steering wheel and are shaped to be intuitively easy to press. The width, height and position of the instrumentation display, such as the shift-up indicator and a gear position, were also determined to be easily seen while driving on a circuit or the street.

== Specifications ==
Official specifications and performance figures for the GR GT are as follows:

Engine type	90° G40E twin-turbo V8 petrol	Valvetrain	DOHC 4-valves/cylinder
Displacement	3,998 cc (4.0 L; 244.0 cu in)	Bore x stroke	87.5 mm × 83.1 mm (3.4 in × 3.3 in)
Transmission	8-speed automatic	Electric motor	Transaxle-integrated single-motor hybrid
Power	650 PS (478 kW; 641 hp)	Torque	850 N⋅m (627 lb⋅ft)
Kerb weight	1,750 kg (3,858 lb)	Power-to-weight ratio	0.37 PS/kg (272 kW/t; 331 hp/ST)
Weight distribution	45:55 (front:rear)	Top speed	320 km/h (199 mph)

== Motorsport ==
The GT3 version of the GR GT will make its official debut in the final round of the 2026 Super GT Series at Twin Ring Motegi, entered by Rookie Racing for Hiroaki Ishiura and Tokiya Suzuki.
