= Tokyo Auto Salon =

Annual auto show held in Chiba City, Japan

Tokyo Auto Saloon ジャパンモビリティショー
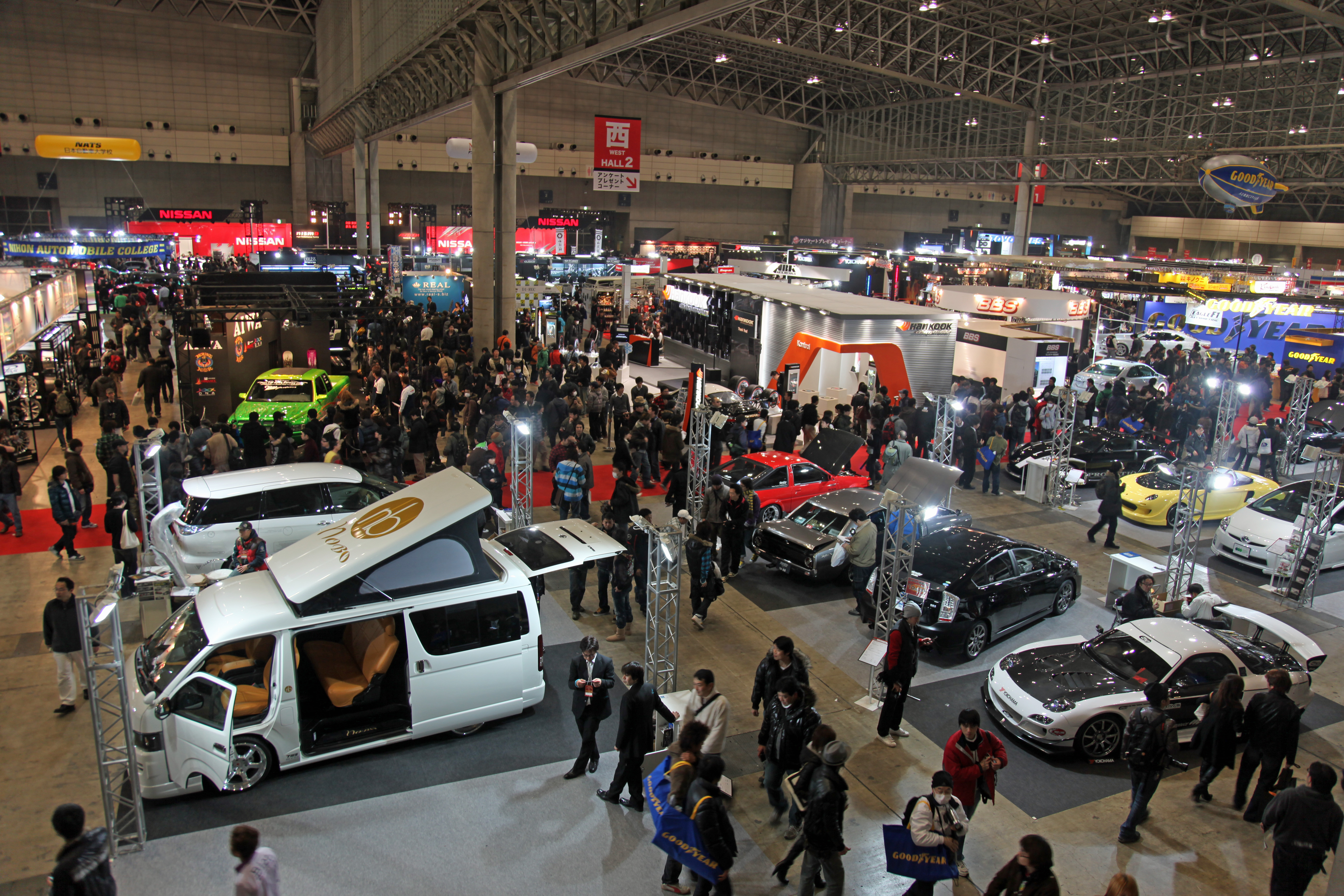
- The event in 2010
- Status: Active
- Genre: Auto show
- Frequency: Annual
- Venue: Harumi International Trade Center (Harumi, until 1996); Tokyo Big Sight (1997–1998); Makuhari Messe (1999–present)
- Location: Tokyo
- Coordinates: 35°38′54″N 140°2′5″E
- Country: Japan
- Years active: 1983–present
- Inaugurated: 1983 (as Tokyo Exciting Car Show)
- Founder: Daijiro Inada
- Most recent: 9 February 2026 – 11 February 2026
- Next event: 15 February 2027 – 17 February 2027
- Website: www.tokyoautosalon.jp

The Tokyo Auto Salon (東京オートサロン, Tokyo Ōto Saron) (formerly known as the Tokyo Exciting Auto Show) is an annual auto show held in January at the Makuhari Messe, Chiba City, Japan for Performance and custom aftermarket parts and technology displays. Hosted by the Nippon Auto Parts Aftermarket Committee (NAPAC), the Tokyo Auto Salon is one of the top motor shows globally for modified and tuned cars.

The 2019 Tokyo Auto Salon featured 906 vehicles, 426 exhibitors, and 4,175 booths that offered aftermarket accessories for purchase. There are also after-market parts manufacturers, custom shops, care manufacturers, automotive businesses, and automotive vocational schools. There are not only custom cars and after-market manufacturers, there is also live entertainment. Top musicians from around the world and talk shows hosting famous drivers and celebrities can be seen at the Tokyo Auto Salon.

One of the more popular forms of entertainment are the "booth babes" who are popular among the spectators and photographers alike. "Booth babes" tend to have a following of fans from various other auto shows throughout the year.

The Tokyo Auto Salon started in 1983 with the name Tokyo Exciting Auto Show and began using its current name in 1987. The exhibition takes place every year in January. On the opening Friday, entry to the exhibition is permitted from 9 am to 7 pm. On Saturday, the show is open to the public from 9 am to 7 pm, and on Sunday from 9 am to 6 pm. The main organizer for the Tokyo Auto Salon is the Tokyo Auto Salon Association (TASA). The main promoter of the Tokyo Auto Salon is Tokyo Auto Salon Committee. The affiliate co-promoter is NAPAC. The Chiba Prefecture government, Chiba City government, Avex Entertainment Inc., San-Eisyobo Publishing Co., Ltd., Idea Inc., and the Option-Land Global Communications Association are all affiliate sponsors and supporting organizations.

== Venue ==
The Tokyo Auto Salon takes place at Makuhari Messe. The Tokyo Auto Salon's popularity has grown resulting in an increases from 8 halls to 11 halls at the Makuhari Messe. In addition to Tokyo Auto Salon occupying 11 of the International Exhibition Halls, it also takes place in the Makuhari Event Hall and International Conference Hall. The event also extends outside the event center into the Outdoor Arena and road of the neighboring Zozo Marine Stadium. The 2012 Auto Salon required a space of 54,000 m^{2}, while the 2013 Auto salon increased to a space of 72,000 m^{2} (Wijayasinha, 2013). Makuhari Messe is one of the leading comprehensive convention facilities in Japan. It is a full-scale convention complex with three large-scale facilities, which are the International Exhibition Hall, International Conference Hall, and Makuhari Event Hall. It also contains a parking lot that can facilitate 6,000 vehicles. There are also six international hotels located within walking distance from the convention center. The convention center host tradeshows, exhibitions, international conferences, ceremonies, parties, symposiums, concerts, sports events, and fashion shows all year round.

In 2012, the Tokyo Auto Salon held a show in Thailand. This marked the first year the Tokyo Auto Salon granted a license to a Thai enterprise to host the Auto Show under its brand. This was also the first automotive performance and custom parts show held in Thailand. The show featured more than 30 award-winning concept cars imported from Japan, as well as other premium and eco friendly vehicles. The following year, the "Tokyo Auto Salon Singapore 2013" was held at the Marina Bay Sands resort, supported by the Tokyo Auto Salon Association (TASA) of Japan, MediaCorp, and Muse Group. The purpose of the Singaporean version of the exhibition is to create a healthy culture for cars that promotes legal modifications. Organizers of the Singapore show hope to hold future shows that show modifications that would be legal for car enthusiasts.

It was announced in January 2023 that Tokyo Auto Salon will be held that year in Kuala Lumpur. Officially named Tokyo Auto Salon Kuala Lumpur, it was officially organised by Muse Group, which also organised Tokyo Auto Salon Singapore in 2013. In March 2023, Muse was joined by Element X as joint organisers for the event. The first edition was held at Malaysia International Trade and Exhibition Centre (MITEC) from June 9 to 11 2023.

In 2025, Tokyo Auto Salon would also be held in Hong Kong for the first time. Planned to be held from December 11 to 14, 2025, the event is held in conjunction with International MotorXpo Hong Kong at AsiaWorld-Expo.

== Introductions ==
=== 2013 ===
At the 2013 Tokyo Auto Salon, car manufactures introduced new concept features to older models. Nissan introduced modified versions of their 2012 line of Juke, Note, Fairlady Z, and GT-R models. The new modifications kept with the "green" trend in vehicle features, which included increased engine output and improved aerodynamics. Nissan's highlight debut for the 2013 Tokyo Auto Salon, was the unveiling of the NV350 Caravan Rider Transporter. The caravan was specifically made for the Tokyo Auto Salon and is a cross between a commercial van and a leisure cruising vehicle. Nissan also showed up to the Auto Salon with race cars like the Motul Autech GT-R. Honda, a Japanese motor company, showed up to the Tokyo Auto Salon with a series of 10 vehicles in the N-One mini family. Models included the N-One Modulo style, Mugen Racing N-One Concept, and an N-One model created by the Japan Nailist Association. Honda also brought with them an "exhibition model" S2000 Modulo. This model reflects an old roadster. This is the first time this model has been seen since it left production in 2009. A design study is being presented on Honda's CR-V as well as the CR-Z Mugen RZ. The later of which will only produce 300 units.

=== 2015 ===
The 2015 Tokyo Auto Salon saw manufacturers such as Toyota showcase a range of modified vehicles, from a Land Cruiser with 46-inch tyres to a Gazoo Racing GT86.

=== 2023 ===
Production cars:

- Renault Mégane RS Trophy Limited Edition
- Mitsubishi Delica Mini
- BYD Atto 3
- BYD Dolphin
- BYD Seal

Concept cars:

- Subaru Crosstrek Boost Gear
- Subaru Rex Boost Gear

=== 2024 ===
Production cars:

- Honda Civic RS
- Honda ACCORD e：HEV SPORTS LINE
- Lotus Eletre
- Lotus Emira
- Mitsubishi Triton
- Nissan Ariya Nismo
- Nissan GT-R Nismo
- Nissan Fairlady Z Nismo
- Nissan Skyline Nismo
- Suzuki Swift
- Subaru WRX S4 STI Sport
- Toyota GR Yaris refresh
- Toyota Century GRMN

Concept cars:

- Honda WR-V FIELD EXPLORER CONCEPT
- Mugen Civic Type R Group.A
- Mugen Civic Type R Group.B
- Hyundai Ioniq 5 N NPX1
- Lexus LBX Morizo RR
- Lexus RZ450e F SPORT Performance
- MAZDA SPIRIT RACING 3 Concept
- MAZDA SPIRIT RACING RS Concept
- Mitsubishi Triton Snow Shredder Concept
- Mitsubishi Outlander PHEV Active Field
- Mitsubishi Delica D:5 Chamonix Snow Gear
- Mitsubishi Delica Mini Chamonix Snow Gear
- Nissan Disaster Support Mobile-Hub
- Nissan X-Trail Crawler Concept
- Nissan X-Trail Autech Sports Spec Concept
- Nissan Serena Autech Sports Spec Concept
- Nissan Roox Beams Customized Concept
- Nissan March Customized Concept
- Suzuki Spacia Papaboku Kitchen
- Suzuki Super Carry Mountain Trail
- Suzuki Swift Cool Yellow Rev
- Toyota iQ GRMN Supercharger
- Toyota GR COROLLA MORIZO CUSTOM

=== 2025 ===
Production cars:

- BYD Sealion 7
- Honda Prelude
- Hyundai Inster
- Suzuki Solio (Facelift)
- Nissan Fairlady Z (RZ34) (Facelift)

=== 2026 ===
Production cars:

- Acura Integra
- Honda NSX Tribute by Italdesign
- Honda Passport
- Toyota GR GT
- Toyota GR GT3

Concept cars

- Nissan Aura Nismo RS Concept
- ID. GTI Concept

== Response ==
2019 Tokyo Auto Salon experienced record high attendance with 330,666 visitors attending over the three day event. This increasing number of attendees was matched with a greater number of cars displayed in the 2019 event. The increasing popularity of the Tokyo Auto Salon has gained the attention of both international vendors as well as the media. Media coverage of the event has been picked up by several well-known magazine and media channels commonly mentioning their favorite cars and concepts from the event. In the 2019 event 1,886 of the visitors attended as media personal. This led to a wide coverage of the different concepts and cars that were displayed and debuted at the show. Media outlets that provided coverage on the event include: Motor Trend, Car and Driver, Jalopnik, and several other media outlets.

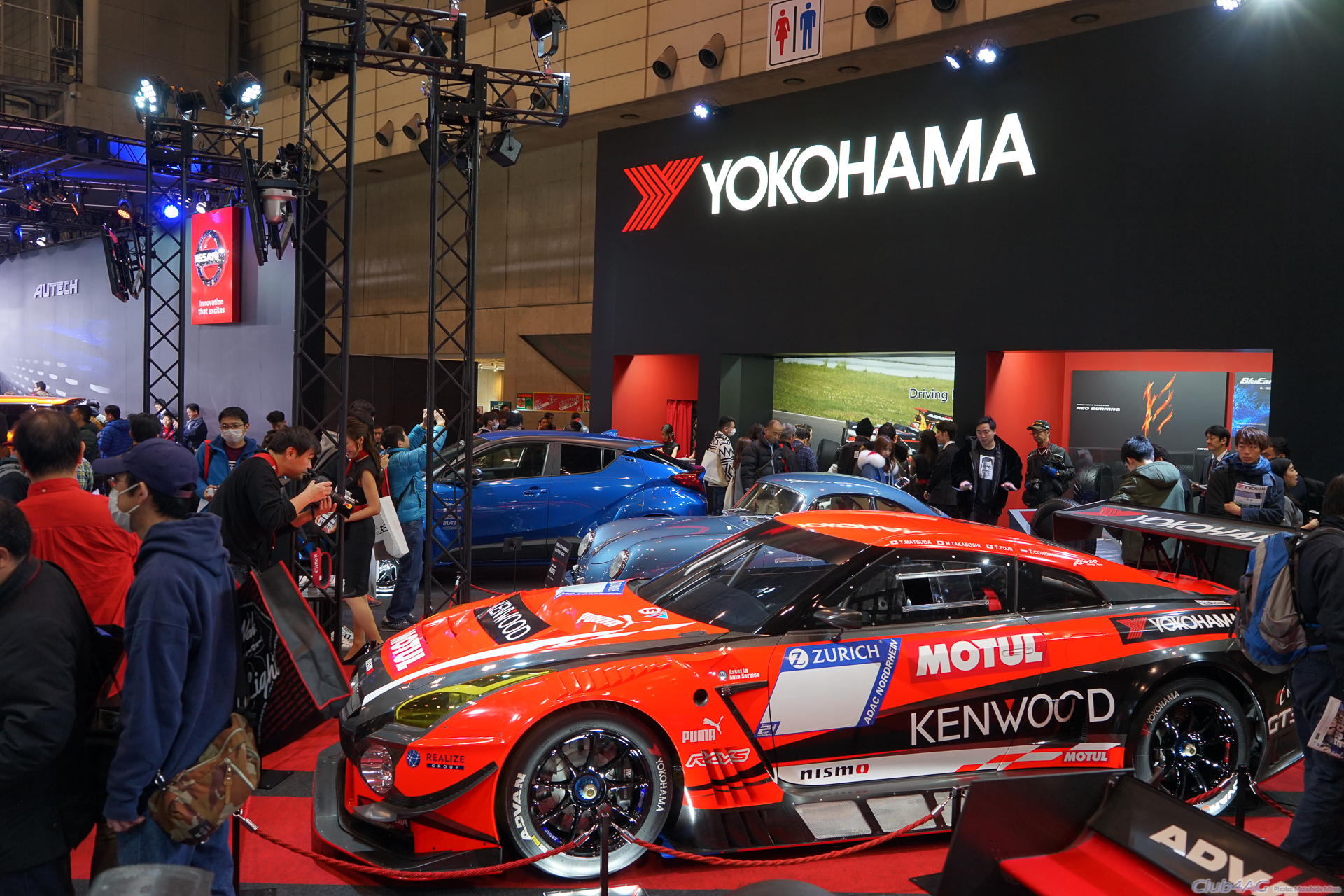
2019 Tokyo Auto Salon
