= ECOM =

ECOM or Ecom may refer to:

- E-commerce, type of business model
- ECOM Agroindustrial, a global commodity trading and processing company
- United States Army Electronics Command, former structure of the United States Army Communications-Electronics Command
- Toyota eCom, an electric vehicle
- E-COM, a hybrid mail process

== See also ==
- eComXpo, a free online virtual tradeshow
- E-comm (disambiguation)
