= Toyota Ha:mo =

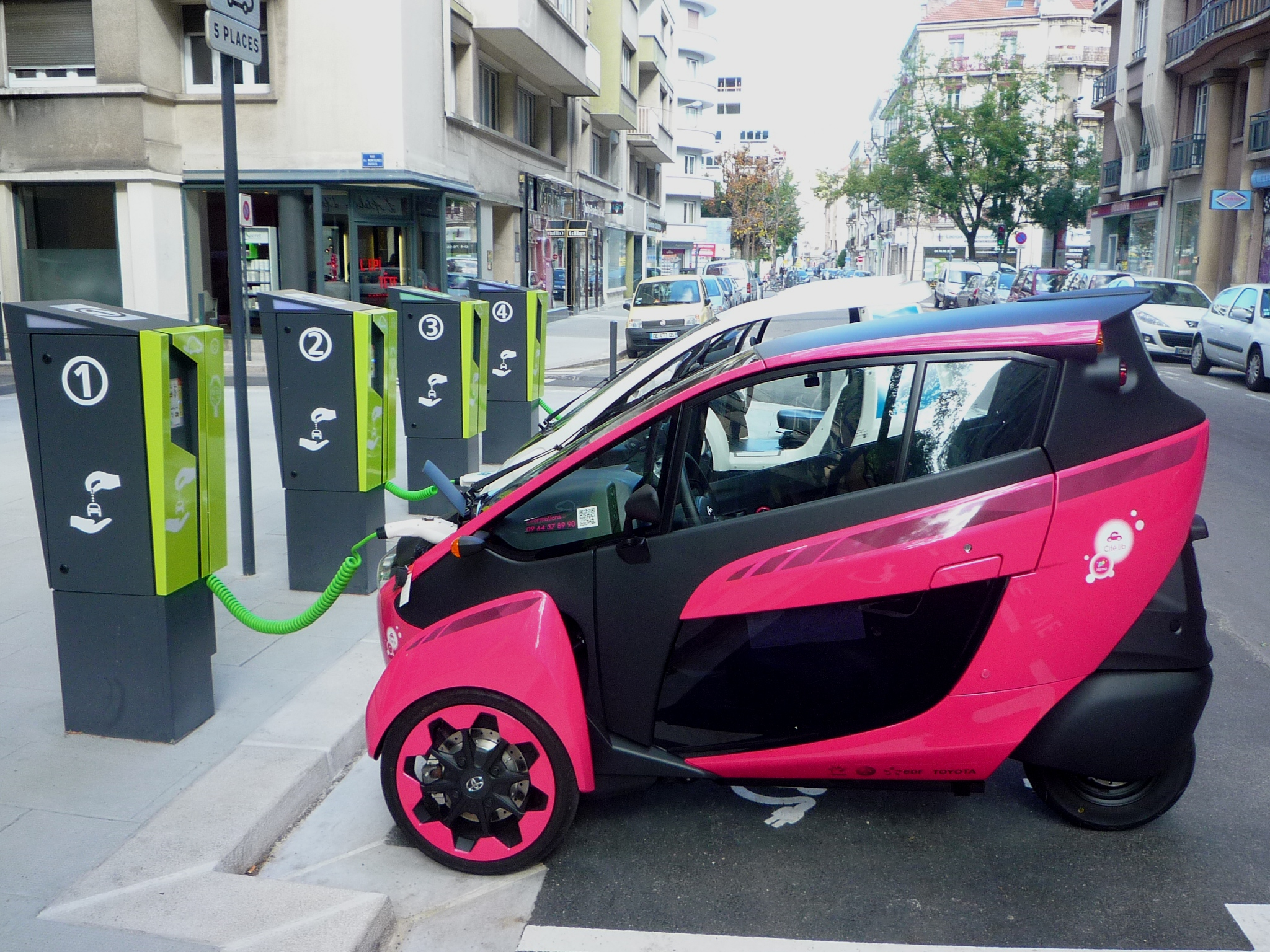
Toyota i-Road in the car-sharing system with the Cité lib by Ha:mo in Grenoble

The Toyota Ha:mo (from Harmonious Mobility) is a system for organizing public transport, integrating short-term rental of public electric vehicles with public transport. The second pillar of the system is the portal available in the browser and as a mobile application, suggesting the best combinations of connections and means of transport, taking into account public transport and automatic vehicle pickup points located in various points of the city. The portal and mobile application allow you to reserve a vehicle at a selected point.

The most used vehicle in the Ha:mo short-term rental system is the Toyota i-Road, a small three-wheeled vehicle that combines the features of a car and a scooter. The Ha:mo systems also use the COMS electric microcar produced by Toyota Auto Body.

So far (October 2015), Ha:mo has been implemented as a pilot program in three cities - Toyota, Grenoble and Tokyo.

Toyota declares that "The aim of the Ha:mo project is to try to organize low-emission, individual urban transport, i.e. producing minimal amounts of exhaust gas, without limiting the mobility of the society. The program is to lead to an effective increase in mobility thanks to new technological achievements. As part of Ha:mo, Toyota is constantly develops research on supercompact electric vehicles for short distances around the city."
