= Engagement marketing =

Marketing strategy

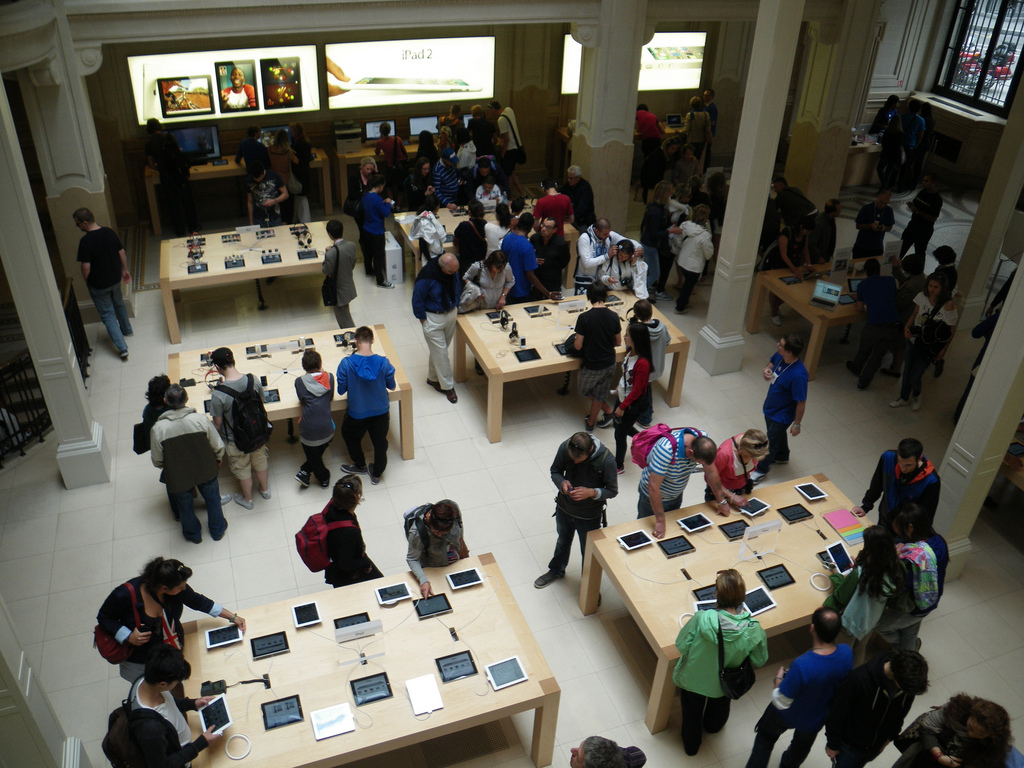
Apple's concept stores include video walls, wi-fi and desks to provide an immersive customer experience.

Engagement marketing is a marketing strategy that directly engages consumers and invites and encourages them to participate in the evolution of a brand or a brand experience. Rather than looking at consumers as passive receivers of messages, engagement marketers believe that consumers should be actively involved in the production and co-creation of marketing programs, developing a relationship with the brand.

Consumer engagement is when a brand and a consumer connect. According to Brad Nierenberg, experiential marketing is the live, one-on-one interactions that allow consumers to create connections with brands. Consumers will continue to seek and demand one-on-one, shareable interaction with a brand.

== Terminology ==
It is also sometimes called experiential marketing, brand activation, on-ground marketing, live marketing, participation marketing, loyalty marketing, or special events.

== Virtual extension ==
Experiential marketing is a growing trend which involves marketing a product or a service through custom memorable experiences that engage the customers and create emotional attachment to the product/service. Physical and interactive experiences are used to reinforce the offer of a product and make customers feel as if they are part of it. Experiences are positively related to customer's attitudes, mood, and behaviors. They also represent a means through which a company can gain competitive advantage by differentiating itself from competitors. To achieve success, an experience should be engaging, compelling, and able to touch the customer's senses and capture their loyalty.

Many aspects differentiate experiential from traditional marketing. First, experiential marketing focuses on providing sensory, emotional, cognitive, and rational values to the consumers. Second, experiential marketing aims to create synergies between meaning, perception, consumption, and brand loyalty. Furthermore, experiential marketing requires a more diverse range of research methods in order to understand consumers.

Smith has developed a six-step process to develop an effective experiential branding strategy. The first step includes carrying out a customer experience audit in order to analyze the current experience of the brand. The second step is to create a brand platform and develop a touchpoint with customers. The following step includes designing the brand experience; coordinating the brand's people, products and processes against the brand proposition. The next steps involve communicating the brand proposition internally and externally. The last step consists of monitoring performance in order to ensure that the brand is meeting its objectives.

Nowadays, experiential marketing is getting more technologically advanced and personalized. The wide spread of the Internet and the increasing competition among online retailers has led to the rise of virtual experiential marketing (VEM). VEM uses the Internet and its various channels to create an enriched and engaging experience by using visual and audio tools. VEM relies on an electronic environment that engages customers and arouses their emotional responses to create an unparalleled experience and consequently capture their loyalty. The elements which characterize virtual experiential marketing are: sense, interaction, pleasure, flow and community relationship. Furthermore, affective involvement has been identified as a key factor which affects online purchase intention. Thus, the online experience must emphasize an emotional appeal to the consumer in order to build purchase intention.

Management consultancy A.T. Kearney has developed a model to create high impact virtual customer experiences, emphasizing four basic steps:

1. Develop a compelling customer value proposition. In developing this, it is important to understand how an online experience can satisfy customer needs.
2. Create the digital customer experience framework to address all areas of interaction between customers and the business.
3. Use proven tools, the "7Cs", to support the framework. The key tools are: content, customization, customer care, communication, community, connectivity, and convenience.
4. Integrate the online and offline customer experience. In fact, companies can enhance the virtual customer experience through consistent links with the offline world.

== Engagement ==
Engagement measures the extent to which a consumer has a meaningful brand experience when exposed to commercial advertising, sponsorship, television contact, or other experience. In March 2006 the Advertising Research Foundation (ARF) defined Engagement as "turning on a prospect to a brand idea enhanced by the surrounding context".

According to a study by Jack Morton Worldwide, 11 out of 14 consumers reported preferring to learn about new products and services by experiencing them personally or hearing about them from an acquaintance. Meanwhile, a report by The Event Marketing Institute and Mosaic found that 74% of consumers say that engaging with branded event marketing experiences makes them more likely to buy the products being promoted.

Engagement is complex because a variety of exposure and relationship factors affect engagement, making simplified rankings misleading. Typically, engagement with a medium often differs from engagement with advertising, according to an analysis conducted by the Magazine Publishers of America.

Related to this notion is the term program engagement, which is the extent to which consumers recall specific content after exposure to a program and advertising. Starting in 2006 U.S. broadcast networks began guaranteeing specific levels of program engagement to large corporate advertisers.

== Multi-dimensional communication ==
Keith Ferrazzi wrote in 2009 that Information Age was transitioning into what he termed the Relationship Age, "in which emotion, empathy, and cooperation are critical success traits" and where "technology and human interaction are intersecting and trust, conversation, and collaboration are top of mind and top of agenda".

In 2006, researchers from market research company Gallup identified two-dimensional (two-way) communication where consumers participate, share, and interact with a brand as a creator of the engagement crucial to business and personal success.

Two-dimensional (2D) communication and engagement is where "both giver and receiver are listening to each other, interacting, learning and growing from the process".

Three-dimensional engagement ("3DE") has "not only length and width, but depth, where both giver and receiver connect to a higher power and are changed in the experience. Not just a conversation, but connection to a purpose that transforms all in the process."

== As philosophy ==
Greg Ippolito, creative director of the digital marketing agency IMA, wrote that the key point of differentiation between engagement marketing and other forms is that the former "is anchored by a philosophy, rather than a focus on specific marketing tools". That philosophy is that audiences should be engaged in the sales process when they want, and by which channels they prefer, through a process called “actionable empathy.”

Ippolito has argued that traditional top-down marketing results, largely, in the production and communication of white noise, whereas engagement marketing assumes a different approach:

"Think of a salesperson who walks up to you in a store. You tell him thanks, you're okay, you're just looking. But he hovers and looms, finds ways to insert himself into your activity, and is a general annoyance. That's what typical marketing feels like: intrusive and disruptive. Engagement Marketing is the opposite. It's a salesperson who hangs back and engages you if/when you need help. Who can sense what you want to do, and help you arrive at that decision. Who will contact you directly with exclusive sales information, if—and only if—you request it.
Engagement Marketing, done well, means connecting with audiences who want to hear from you, in relevant, meaningful, interesting ways. If you can pull that off, everything changes."

— Greg Ippolito (2012)

After launching IMA in 2013, Ippolito shifted his focus to momentum marketing—described as "the next evolution of engagement marketing"—which shares the same customer-centric philosophy, but places a greater emphasis on leveraging data to reach target audiences online via their most well-traveled channels:

"[M]odern consumers are hard to pin down; they're constantly in motion—traversing different spaces, utilizing different media, and as always, experiencing a range of different thoughts and feelings throughout any given day ... [The key is to] leverage the existing momentum of target consumers. By doing so, we can ... guide them where we want them to go—with minimum waste and maximum efficiency."

— Greg Ippolito (2013)

== Examples ==
PROMO magazine has credited Gary M. Reynolds, founder of GMR Marketing, with being the pioneer in the practice of engagement marketing. It has cited Reynolds' formation of the Miller Band Network in 1979 as the seminal engagement marketing moment.

Another example of engagement marketing is seen in the marketing strategy of Jones Soda. At the company's website, regular customers are allowed to send in photos that will then be printed on bottles of the soda. These photos can be put on a small order of custom-made soda, or, if the photos are interesting enough, they can be put into production and used as labels for a whole production run. This strategy is effective at getting customers to co-create the product, and engaging customers with the brand.

The Macys Thanksgiving Day parade is a type of experiential marketing, as the viewer is invited to experience floats and entertainment tied to specific brands (and Macy's itself).

Another example of engagement marketing is seen in the marketing strategy of Jaihind Collection Pune for their paraplegic fashion Show.

In the 21st century, engagement marketing has taken a new turn with the advent of different technologies. The effect of smartphones, touchscreens and virtual reality has become prominent. Examples of such engagement marketing can be found online. Though technological advancement made such campaigns possible, innovative ideas remain as important as ever.

More recent examples of engagement marketing have incorporated augmented reality to create interactive brand experiences. At Expo 2025 in Osaka, image-based augmented reality was used in pavilion exhibitions to overlay digital content onto physical displays, including an implementation using the Artivive platform at the Austrian Pavilion.

== Offline engagement marketing tools ==
- Street marketing, also known as street teams
- Youth marketing, also known as entertainment marketing
- Event management, also known as event marketing
- Mobile marketing tours: often, brands will utilize custom-branded RVs, buses, and motor coaches to draw attention to their offering, serving as mobile billboards as well as mobile centers to create brand experiences on-site in retail parking lots or at larger events.
- Marketing through amenities: companies promote their brands through interactive marketing via amenities such as charging stations.
- IOT Device connected to social platforms that display the numbers of fans and personalised messages to the offline customers.
- Immersive storytelling uses immersion or immersive technology to create virtual brand worlds for consumers to engage with. Using technology such as virtual and augmented reality, CGI and 360° video content, face and gesture recognition, holographics and ultra-haptics, 3D scanning/mapping/printing, wearable and touchscreen technologies, geo-location technologies, drones, photobooths and magic eyes, brands can interact with their audiences in new and creative ways.

== Online engagement marketing tools ==
- Blogs: For engagement marketing purposes, companies can share content on their own blogs and participate as a commenter or content provider on relevant external blogs. Hosting a campaign that gives prizes to external blogs readers for their participation in a contest is an example of an engagement marketing campaign aimed at external blogs.
- Social networking sites: Social networking sites (such as Facebook, Instagram, LinkedIn, and Twitter) are ideal for engagement marketing because they provide a way for people to interact with brands and create a two-way dialogue between customers and companies. Most companies maintain a presence on several of these sites. Some of these platforms have also created specific types of online presences for companies. For example, Facebook introduced Fan pages in 2007. Engagement outcomes such as sharing behaviours include motivations such as enjoyment, self-efficacy, learning, personal gain, altruism, empathy, social engagement, community interest, reciprocity, and reputation as well as social response to fan page cues such as social interactive value, visual appearance and identity attractiveness of the branded object Ideally, activations such as photo booths tied the event experience back to the user's social channels.
- Webcasts: Differing from internal webcast meetings with a small, specific invitation list, engagement marketing online events are aimed at a much larger and public audience. They are typically available live or on-demand, which allows viewers to view content on their schedule. Similar to conferences, audience members can ask the speakers questions and participate in polls during live webcasts.
- Email campaigns: One of the earliest online engagement marketing tools, email marketing requires target audiences to opt-in to directly receive a marketer's emails. Companies can also encourage individuals to share their messages virally, via the forwarding of emails to colleagues, friends and family.
- Crowdsourcing: Crowdsourcing sites offer engagement marketing opportunities through their open media contests. Crowdsourcing sites like these generate brand ambassadors as an organic byproduct of the crowdsourcing process itself by encouraging users to share their submissions on various social networking sites. By first engaging fans and consumers in the act of shaping the brand identity itself, there is increased brand awareness and development of brand relationships well before launching any official media campaign.

== See also ==
- Outline of marketing
- Content marketing
- Evangelism marketing
- Virtual engagement
- Visual marketing

== Bibliography ==
- Ahonen, T. and Moore, Alan. "Communities Dominate Brands: Business and Marketing Challenges for the 21st Century", Futuretext, 2005. ISBN 0-9544327-3-8
- Tönnies, Fredinand. "Community and Society: Gemeinschaft and Gesellschaft", Dover Publications (December 3, 2002). ISBN 978-0-486-42497-2
