= Virtual event =

Interactive event that takes place online

A virtual event is an online event that involves people interacting in a virtual environment on the web, rather than meeting in a physical location. Virtual events are typically multi-session online events that often feature webinars and webcasts. They are highly interactive, often aiming to create as similar an experience as possible to their physical counterparts.

Popular uses of virtual events include virtual tradeshows, virtual job fairs, virtual conferences, virtual sales meetings, virtual college open days, and virtual company-wide gatherings. Virtual events are used by organizations to deliver presentations, training, job fairs, expos, internal meetings, and sessions. They are led by a range of key stakeholders, including associations, professional meeting organizers, company executives, marketing managers, product management, human resources, and more.

Virtual events have been widely held due to the COVID-19 pandemic, during which in-person gatherings have faced restrictions, prohibitions, or health and safety concerns.

== Types ==
Virtual event can also refer to aspects of an event that are brought to attendees through an online experience. There are several types of virtual events:

=== Live ===
Live virtual events are live-streamed as they occur with no delays or pre-recordings much like a live television show.

=== Global "round-the-clock" events ===
During the COVID-19 pandemic, the number of so-called global events that "virtually travel the globe" "with the sun from East to West". The International Association of Constitutional Law and Alma Mater Europaea university organized their first such event in July 2020, calling it a "unique round-the-clock and round-the-globe" event, which featured 52 speakers from 28 countries.

=== On-demand ===
On-demand events consist of pre-recorded content a person may access online at their discretion. The content may have originated from a prior live event or the content may have been recorded specifically for on-demand.

=== Simulive ===
Simulive is an amalgamation of a pre-recorded webinar and a live interaction (simulated+live = simulive). In a simulive event, all audio, video, and presentation materials are pre-recorded. However, the event is scheduled and delivered to a live audience at a designated date and time.

== Origins and history ==
Virtual events started to become increasingly popular during the late-2000s recession as they offered an economically and environmentally effective way to bring thousands of attendees to an event from around the globe. In some cases, traditional physical events now offer a parallel virtual component – creating a 'hybrid event'.

Virtual environments play a growing role in the marketing mix. For marketers, virtual events can provide detailed marketing data, because the activities of each participant can be tracked and evaluated. A virtual engagement index is a variable to measure interaction quantity and quality of participants. This is a very useful tool for sales people who then know the quality of the lead they are pursuing, however not all providers offer this feature yet.

Virtual events can offer a number of ways for participants to connect and communicate. Virtual booths, forums and designated meeting places allow participants to connect with event staff, exhibitors and sponsors, or fellow attendees using online chat, video and voice. Participants can leverage their social network within the event to form interest groups or find like-minded individuals. They can also share the findings with their online communities, often leading to the viral popularity of an event.

One of the key differences between virtual worlds and virtual events is that a virtual world is available as a persistent (perpetual) environment, even after the live part of the event is over. Many organizers are moving from episodic events to a continuous virtual engagement of their customer and prospect communities, (archive of the event). This permits attendees to return to parts of the event to see a complete session again, review content or gather additional information. Typically, virtual event organizers allow attendees to store the information gathered in a virtual briefcase, which can contain marketing collateral, as well as contact information of people they met, presentations they attended and content of conversations they held.

While companies have been experimenting with virtual events since the 1990s, their usage increased dramatically during the COVID-19 pandemic, which resulted in the cancellation or modification of live events. Not only have corporations implemented virtual events, events that would normally take place at an onsite venue with live audiences have transitioned to virtual events.

At the onset of the COVID-19 pandemic, scientific associations scrambled to convert their normally on-site events into virtual ones in order to share all the scientific research needed to combat the pandemic. The Genetics Society of America (GSA) was one of the early successes when they were able to convert The Allied Genetics Conference (TACC) event (only held every four years) to a virtual event in April 2020. A different industry example took place on 29 November 2020 when the Miss Earth 2020 was held virtually for the first time in history. Eighty-four international delegates participated. These modifications to virtual have proven resourceful and lucrative for virtual corporate emcees. During the COVID-19 pandemic, The National Speakers Association found 14% of members said that MC/facilitation became their top source of revenue in 2020, up from 3% in 2016.
