= Toyota C+pod =

Electric kei car manufactured by Toyota

Toyota C^{+}pod
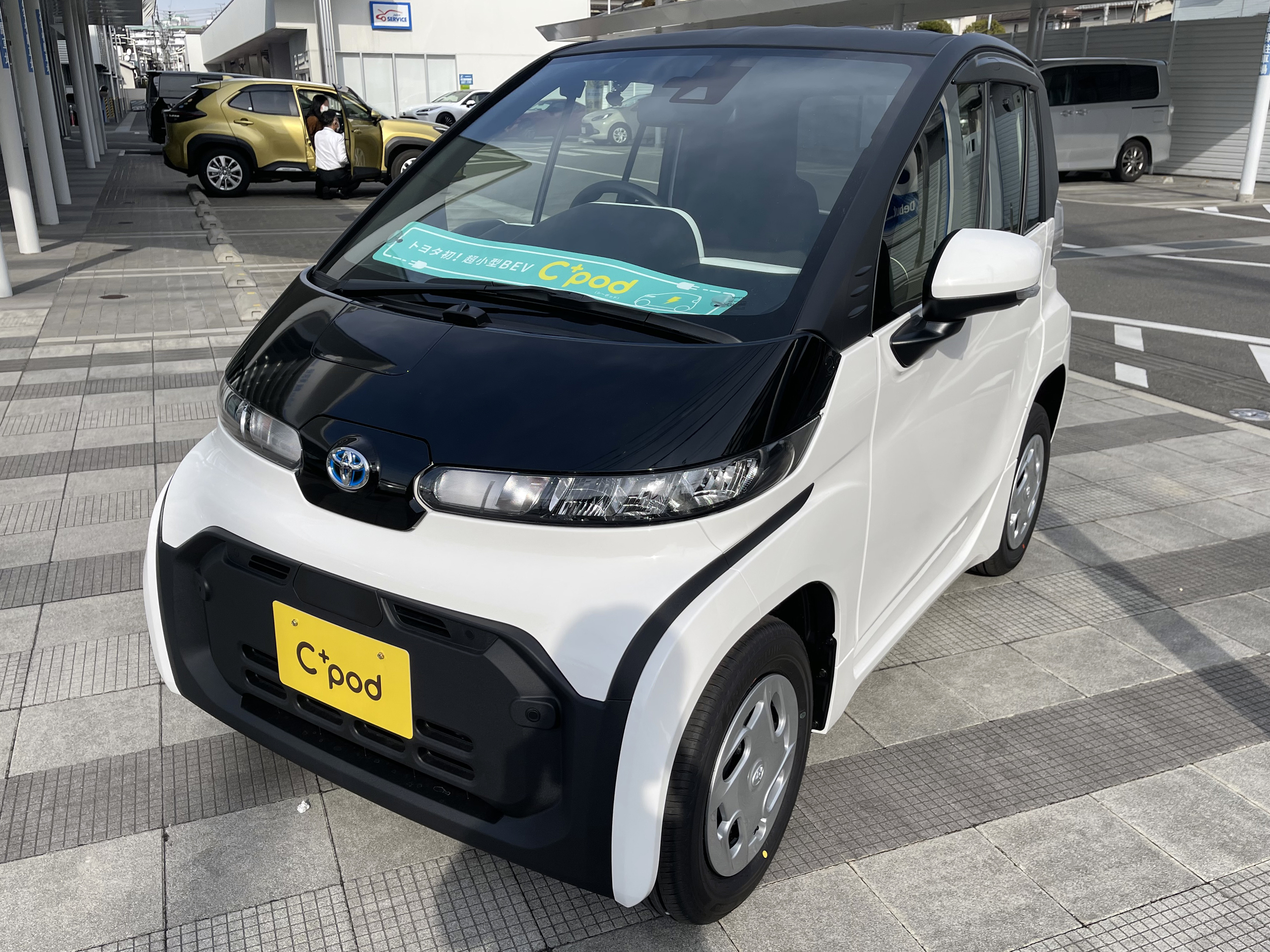
- 2021 Toyota C+pod G (RMV12)

Overview
- Manufacturer: Toyota
- Model code: RMV12
- Production: 2021–2024
- Assembly: Japan: Toyota City, Aichi (Motomachi plant)

Body and chassis
- Class: Kei car Microcar
- Body style: 3-door hatchback
- Layout: Rear-motor, rear-wheel-drive

Powertrain
- Electric motor: 9.2 kW (12 hp; 13 PS) 1RM permanent magnet synchronous
- Power output: 12.3hp (3.5hp continuous), 56Nm
- Battery: 9.06 kWh, 177.6 V lithium-ion
- Electric range: 150 km (93 mi) WLTC (Class 1 only)
- Plug-in charging: 3.2 kW (200V, 16A) AC; V2L: 1.5 kW

Dimensions
- Wheelbase: 1,780 mm (70.1 in)
- Length: 2,490 mm (98.0 in)
- Width: 1,290 mm (50.8 in)
- Height: 1,550 mm (61.0 in)
- Kerb weight: 670–690 kg (1,477–1,521 lb)

Chronology
- Predecessor: Toyota eQ; Toyota eCom

The Toyota C+pod (stylised as C^{+}pod) is a two-seat battery electric kei car manufactured by the Japanese automaker Toyota. Its design was previewed by the Ultra-Compact BEV concept car from October 2019, and its production form was revealed on 25 December 2020. The first batch was sold limited to corporate users, local governments and other organisations in Japan. It is later sold to individual customers starting in December 2021.

Due to its dimensions, it qualifies under the kei car dimension category in Japan. It is the latest vehicle not to use up the maximum dimensions allowed for by the kei car regulations after the Subaru R1. 2 seats, top speed limited to 60 km/h.

In March 2021, it was marketed in Indonesian market as the rental car in Nusa Dua, Bali, along with the COMS. On 19 July 2022, the C+pod was available in the Lake Toba along with the Prius as the Toyota EV Smart Mobility program.

The C+pod is slated to be discontinued in the second quarter of 2024. Regarding the discontinuation, Toyota stated that the vehicle "had fulfilled a certain role as a small mobility vehicle."

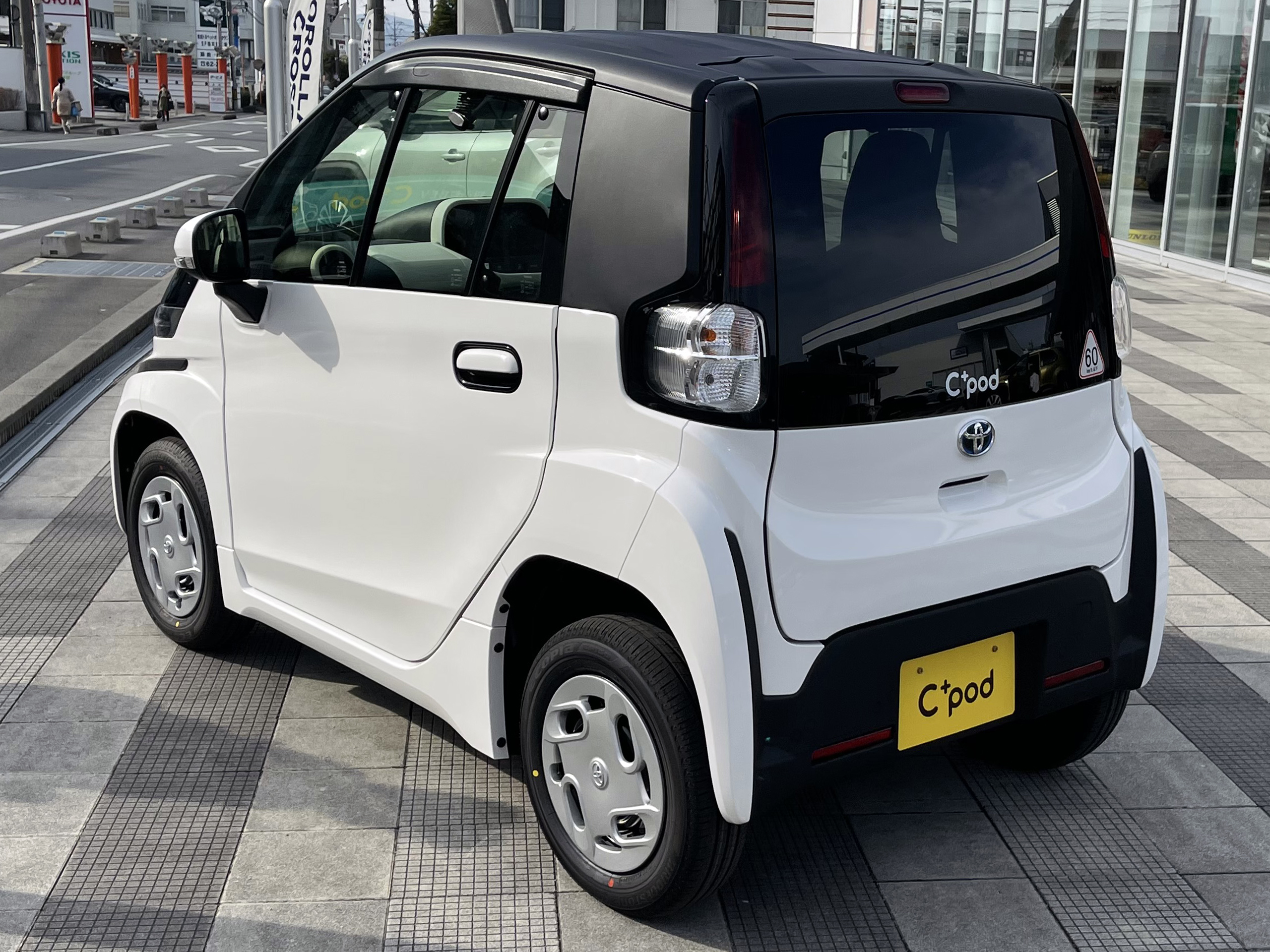
Rear view

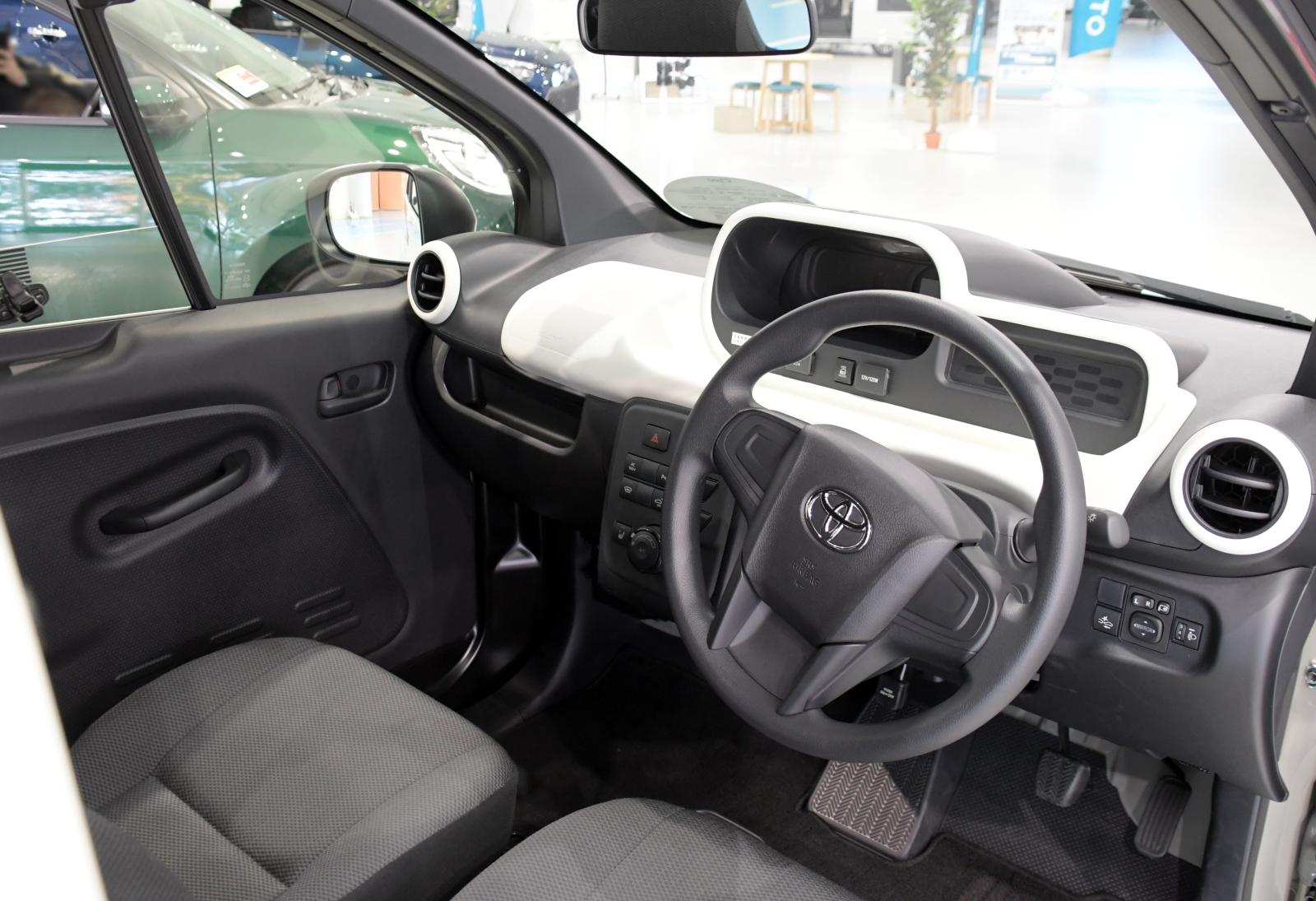
Interior

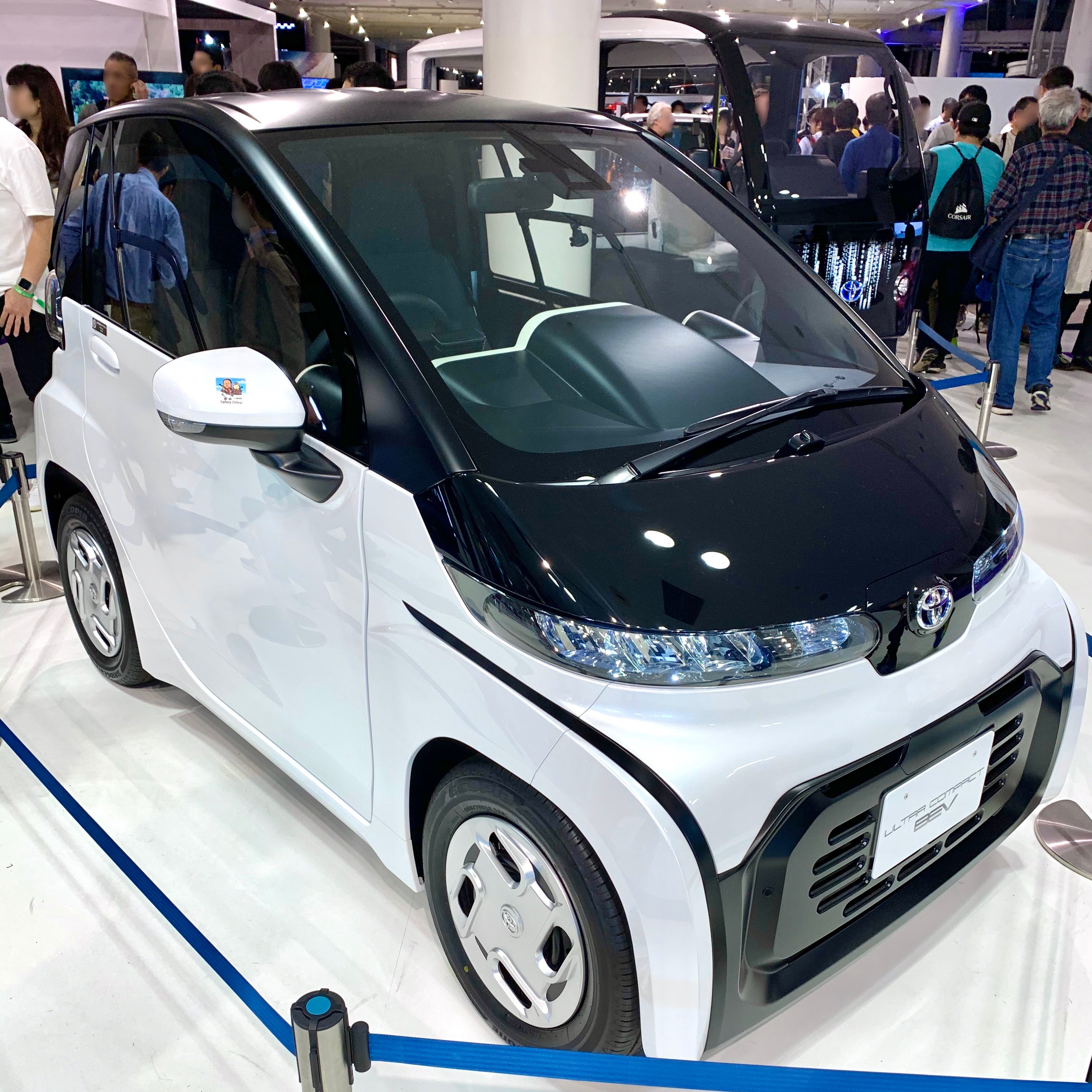
Toyota Ultra-Compact BEV

== See also ==
- Toyota COMS
- Toyota eCom
- Toyota eQ

== See also ==
- List of Toyota vehicles
