= E-comm =

E-comm can refer to:

- Electronic commerce, as an abbreviation, frequently used in the names of e-commerce companies.
- E-Comm, the emergency communications agency for Southwest British Columbia.
- Emerging Communications Conference.

== See also ==
- Ecom (disambiguation)
