= Mission-driven marketing =

Type of marketing strategy

Mission-driven marketing, or mission-based marketing refers to a strategic marketing approach which uses an organization's core mission as the foundation and focus of its marketing communications. Philosophically, it is based on the organization's desire to promote the purpose, aim, and goals of the organization, as outlined in its mission statement, and to communicate the benefits of achieving those goals to its stakeholders.

The term, mission-driven marketing, has historically been associated with the non-profit sector, and non-governmental organizations, as early as 1998. Mission-driven marketing philosophy and strategy has also been applied in the healthcare and education sectors, and is increasingly being adopted by businesses as part of their corporate social responsibility and philanthropy initiatives.

== Key concepts ==
=== Organizational philosophy ===
A mission-driven, or mission-based organization can be non-profit or for-profit, public or private, governmental or non-governmental, philanthropic or religious. Typically, mission-driven organizations, are formed and/or managed to accomplish goals that extend beyond profits for stakeholders, shareholders, and owners to include a societal benefit. This could include an array of focus areas such as, education, youth development, protecting the environment, caring for the sick, fighting poverty, and promoting spirituality. Companies who adopt fair trade or environmental sustainability business practices could also be considered as an organization with a mission-driven focus.

=== Adherence to core values ===
Values based organizations are mission-driven. Therefore, central to mission-driven marketing philosophy is adherence to the organization's core values, and using its mission statement as the basis for planning and implementation of marketing strategy. Market factors are taken into account, but the mission is the final determining factor. It has also been defined as being "mission-based and market driven". Such businesses are increasingly being referred to as a "conscious business", or engaging in "conscious capitalism". The organization's values then provide a foundation for its marketing messages.

== See also ==
- Cause marketing
- Corporate social responsibility
- Enterprise engagement
- Fair Trade
- Green marketing
- Mission statement
- Non-profit organization
- Relationship marketing
- Social enterprise
- Social entrepreneurship
- Social marketing
