= Virtual tradeshow =

Online tradeshow event

A virtual tradeshow (or a virtual trade fair) is a virtual event run in an online environment hosted online for a limited period. It can be considered the online equivalent of a traditional tradeshow or exhibition, but exhibitors and visitors connect on the web rather than in person.

Virtual tradeshows can be accessed anywhere, as their geographic location does not limit them, so all that's needed to attend is a device with a good connection to the internet. Virtual tradeshows facilitate direct interactions between exhibitors and attendees with interactive features, such as live chat, chat rooms, 1 to 1 or group video calls, Q&A, Live webinars or on-demand webinars, webcasts, lucky draws and more.

== Overview ==
A typical virtual tradeshow structure often includes a virtual exhibition hall which users enter with specific permissions and capabilities. Exhibitors can build virtual booths to exhibit information related to their products or services, just as they would at a trade fair in a convention center; visitors view these virtual trade show displays in the exhibition hall. Users - both exhibitors and visitors - within the environment often create avatars as a visual representation of themselves.

Like their physical counterparts, virtual tradeshows may have other components such as a web conference, webcast, web seminar ('webinar'), or other educational presentations. The virtual trade fair thus provides live interaction between users on several levels (one-to-one, one-to-few, one-to-many and many-to-many) and simultaneously. Detailed tracking mechanisms allow organisers to determine traffic flow in the virtual tradeshow. Although virtual tradeshows are usually conducted in specialised web environments, some have been organised and conducted in tightly controlled text-based environments.

Virtual tradeshows can be used for international tradeshows, business match-makers, procurement fairs, or product launches. The experience also translates well for other applications such as virtual job fairs, virtual benefits fairs, online employee networks, distributor fairs, and venture capital fairs.

Providers of virtual event platforms have seen immense growth in the demand for their products, partly attributable to the 2009-2010 recession driving cost-cutting approaches to business. According to a Champion Exposition Services study, one in four people planned to use a digital event platform in the association market. The study also found that 70% of "respondents are actively producing, considering or interested in pursuing virtual events." However, many were not looking to replace physical events but to enhance them with interactive virtual features.

=== Visitor facilities ===
Visitors to a virtual tradeshow usually fill out an online registration form to create an online badge, then enter a virtual exhibit hall to visit virtual booths. The virtual booths often reflect the imagery of a real-world tradeshow booth with desks and displays (this similarity helps users relate to them more easily). A virtual booth typically has several icons which can trigger different responses upon the click of a mouse. For example, visitors might initiate instant communication with the exhibitor via an instant message, email or a voice call. Icons might also deliver multimedia such as videos, audio messages, or other slide-show presentations.

=== Exhibitor facilities ===
Virtual exhibitors use online tools to upload relevant and tailored content to appeal to the audiences. Virtual exhibits may be made to look like an exhibitors' real-world booth in any in-person trade fair where they may be exhibiting.

While some events are hosted only online, virtual tradeshows could also be run in conjunction with real-world or in-person tradeshows, creating 'hybrid events'.

Virtual tradeshows typically cost much less than traditional trade shows. Since virtual trade shows can be conducted from a person's desk, the cost of travel, lodging and physical construction of a trade show display is eliminated (exhibitors will usually, of course, be charged for the privilege of having an online stand at the virtual tradeshow).

== See also ==
- eComXpo (2005)
