= Enterprise engagement =

Organizational growth strategy

Enterprise engagement is a sub-discipline of marketing and management that focuses on achieving long-term financial results by strategically fostering the proactive involvement and alignment of customers, distribution partners, salespeople, and all human capital outside and inside of an organization. Enterprise engagement is distinct from the traditional sub-disciplines of financial management, marketing, sales, operations, and human resources in that it seeks to achieve long-term success by integrating these various traditional business disciplines to consistently focus the organization on identifying and meeting target audience needs. Enterprise Engagement is related to brand engagement, a term developed in Great Britain in the 2000s to describe an integrated external and internal marketing approach to achieving long-term success for a brand. Enterprise Engagement applies similar principals to the achievement of an organization's overall financial objectives.

Organizations run on the basis of enterprise engagement work collaboratively across departments and divisions to collectively find the best way to achieve long-term financial results by maximizing all human capital, from customers and distributors, agents, or other value-added resellers, to salespeople, employees, and even vendors and shareholders. This approach unifies the organization around a brand and mission that continually seeks to find better ways to help the end-user customer, enhance the relationship with channel partners, suppliers, and employees and ultimately create new opportunities for the business, rather than simply finding ways to improve processes. It looks at human capital in an integrated fashion, rather than separating customer and distribution partner engagement from sales or employee engagement.

Traditional organizations have a siloed approach, in which each business area often works quite independently from the other. Each business unit may or may not be directed to have specific goals related directly or indirectly to improving value or service to their audience – whether that be employees, channel partners, vendors or customers. The silos have a tendency to focus on maintaining and improving processes in order to promote their influence and share of resources. This is demonstrated in the willingness of many companies to sacrifice customer satisfaction to save money on automated telephone answering systems; in this case they have determined that the cost savings of eliminating customer service employees outweighs the benefits of creating a more satisfying customer experience. It is easy to measure the cost savings involved with this decision, but not so easy to measure the impact on customer engagement over time.

While enterprise engagement is related to the field of integrated marketing and has part of its roots there, it is more related to Management in that it requires an integration of all business disciplines across the organization, and therefore cannot be easily organized under one specific sub-discipline of management or another.

== History ==
Enterprise engagement has its roots in research conducted in the 1990s connecting financial results in Sears stores to the engagement of employees.

In their 1993 book, The One to One Future, Don Peppers and Martha Rogers were among the early proponents of customer-focused rather than product- and process-focused marketing, and identified the necessity to address the human element of relationships between customers and an organization.

Additional research on the connection between customer and employee engagement began to emerge in 1999, when Gallup published its ground-breaking book First, Break All the Rules by Buckingham and Coffman which was based on a meta-analysis of decades of employee and business outcomes data from over 100,000 employees and a wide range of industries. They also began publishing studies on the cost of disengaged workers. [see: Would You Fire Your Boss, Gallup Management Journal, Sept. 2007.]. In 2002, a study was released in Great Britain demonstrating a financial link between customer and employee engagement.

In 1998, A.J. Rucci, S.P. Kim, and R.T. Quinn, authors of "The Employee–Customer Profit Chain at Sears" (Harvard Business Review, 1998), identified a direct connection between employee engagement and profitability in Sears stores.

Separately, in the July–August 2005 issue of the Harvard Business Review, the concept of linking customer and employee engagement that is the distinctive element of enterprise engagement was articulated in an article by John H. Fleming, Curt Coffman, and James K. Harter, entitled "Manage Your Human Sigma." The authors wrote, "It’s possible to arrive at a single measure of effectiveness for the employee-customer encounter, this measure has a high correlation with financial performance." Fleming along with co-author

In 2011, David Cameron, then Prime Minister of Great Britain, created the Employee Engagement Task Force "to launch a national conversation about employee engagement right across the private, public and other sectors, with a view to improving the U.K. economy."

In the meantime, the technical committee responsible for the management of ISO 9000 quality process management issued Quality Management Principles and formal standards 10018 for the quality management of people involvement and competence. The principles and standards include the concept of an enterprise approach to engagement; i.e., a consideration of the need to address customers, employees, vendors, distribution partners, etc., in an integrated way to ensure alignment of priorities and expectations.

In August 2019, the Business Roundtable changed its definition of the corporation to focus on the need to benefit all stakeholders – customers, employees, suppliers, communities and shareholders.

In fall of 2020, the World Economic Forum issued recommendations for Stakeholder Capitalism metrics.

In November 2020, the Securities & Exchange Commission required publicly held companies in the US to report on their human capital practices to the extent they are material to their businesses. In June 2021, the SEC announced that it would begin the process to enhance human capital disclosures to require more detailed information.

== Benefits ==
The emergence of enterprise engagement is based on the growing ability of organizations to measure the long-term benefits of engagement in a way that has drawn increasing attention to the subject from leading investors in public companies.

- Happy employees are better equipped to handle workplace relationships, stress and change, according to the latest Gallup Management Journal survey. When respondents were asked how they would characterize their interactions with their coworkers, 86% of engaged employees said their interactions were always positive or mostly positive, vs. 72% of unengaged workers and just 45% of actively disengaged workers. (Gallup Management Journal, 2009)
- Research by CLC-Genesee and its parent, the Corporate Executive Board, shows that average three-year revenue growth for "high-performing companies" – meaning, in part, those that effectively manage employee engagement – was more than twice that of their industry peers. Other key findings: Engaged employees are more likely to stay with their employer than those who have a lower level of engagement, and the more engaged employees are, the lower the inventory "shrink." (CLC-Genesee/Corporate Executive Board, 2009)
- Towers Perrin found that high-engagement firms experienced an earnings-per-share (EPS) growth rate of 28%, compared with an 11.2% decline for low-engagement firms. (Towers Perrin survey, July 2008)
- Gallup research indicates that public organizations ranking in the top quartile of employee engagement had EPS growth more than two-and-a-half times greater than organizations that were below average. (Gallup Management Journal survey, 1/12/06)
- A 2008 BlessingWhite study found that there's a clear correlation between engagement and retention, with 85% of engaged employees indicating that they plan to stay with their employer for at least the next 10 months. (BlessingWhite State of Engagement 2008 report, April/May 2008)
- Data from Best Buy show that stores, where employee engagement increased by a tenth of a point (on a five-point scale), experienced a $100,000 increase in annual sales. (CFO magazine, ‘Measuring Up,’ June 26, 2007)
- JC Penney has found that stores with top-quartile engagement scores generate roughly 10% more in sales per square foot than average and 36% more operating income than similar-sized stores in the lowest quartile. (JC Penney 8-K SEC Filing, April 4, 2007)
- A Manpower survey of call center customers and employees revealed that centers with high employee satisfaction also have high customer satisfaction, whereas centers with low employee satisfaction have low customer satisfaction. (Manpower/SQM Group survey, September 2006)
- A report by the Society for Human Resource Management (SHRM) estimates that by strengthening engagement, MolsonCoors saved more than $1.7 million in one year (SHRM ‘Employee Engagement and Commitment,’ 2006)
- Gallup research has also shown that engaged employees are more productive, profitable, safer, create stronger customer relationships and stay longer with their company than less engaged employees. (Gallup Management Journal survey, January 12, 2006).
- In their 2008 book, Rules to Break and Laws to Follow, authors Don Peppers and Martha Rogers observed that the shift of the balance of power to the consumer will cause organizations to place greater importance on building trust with customers. "The advent of the Internet has shifted the balance of power to consumers, who can move away from a company with a click of the mouse," they wrote.

== Drawbacks ==
- Because of the lack of an agreed-upon nomenclature, framework, and implementation process for engagement, organizations tend to focus on tactical approaches such as "employee experience"; management "civility"; or recognition, benefits, or work-life policies, etc., rather than address engagement on a strategic basis linked to the brand and organizational goals.
- Much of the above-cited research suggests that enterprise engagement requires a strategic approach that focuses on yielding long-term results; it is not a business strategy likely to produce a short-term bounce.
- Today's organizational structures emphasizing silos and the lack of any place in an organization for a "chief people officer" spanning all audiences – other than the chief executive officer – makes it difficult to get started unless the CEO leads the way.
- Enterprise engagement requires the commitment of the chief executive officer and alignment of communications across the organization.
- Enterprise engagement requires leadership, not only at the senior level but also at the branch and departmental level.
- Enterprise engagement is not presently taught in schools or written about in business journals, limiting the number of managers and executives exposed to it.
- An organization run on enterprise engagement principles is not immune to the deleterious effects of changing market forces or poor financial management that could undermine an organization with otherwise engaged customers and employees.
- There is currently a lack of research documentation as to the relative merits of various types of engagement tactics, or the best ways to deploy them.

== Tools of engagement ==
Engagement involves a broad range of disciplines and tactics. A comprehensive study of what motivates people in business conducted in 2002 by the International Society of Performance Improvement for the Incentive Research Foundation identified the following key factors:

- Leadership and culture– the ability of the organization to articulate a culture and vision with benefits to all its constituents.
- Communication – the ability of the organization to convey its vision to its constituents.
- Capability – the ability of an organization's constituents to do what is asked of them.
- Buy-in – the willingness of an organization's constituents to do what is asked of them.
- Support – the degree to which people feel recognized by the organization.
- Emotion – the state of mind people have related to their work or relationship with the organization.
- Measurement and feedback – the degree to which constituents receive feedback for their contribution and to which the organization analyzes results and adjusts accordingly.

Businesses use a wide array of tactics to address the above issues, including:

- Leadership recruitment, training and coaching
- Communications, i.e., print, direct mail, and electronic communications, media, meetings, and promotional products
- Job design to create variety, flexibility, opportunity
- Diversity, Equity, Inclusion (DEI) to maximize the market for customers, talent, supply chains, distribution partners, and communities
- Benefits, wellness, and work-life balance strategies
- Community and social networking activities
- Training and professional development
- Recognition, reward, and incentive programs
- Statistical process controls and analytics

The expertise, products, and services related to these various practices comprise the emerging field of Enterprise Engagement. Bottom line: Much more research is needed to better understand how these various elements affect customer and employee engagement, and financial results.

== See also ==
- Mission-driven marketing
- Observational techniques
- Product bundling
- Virtual engagement
