= Toyota eCom =

Electric vehicle

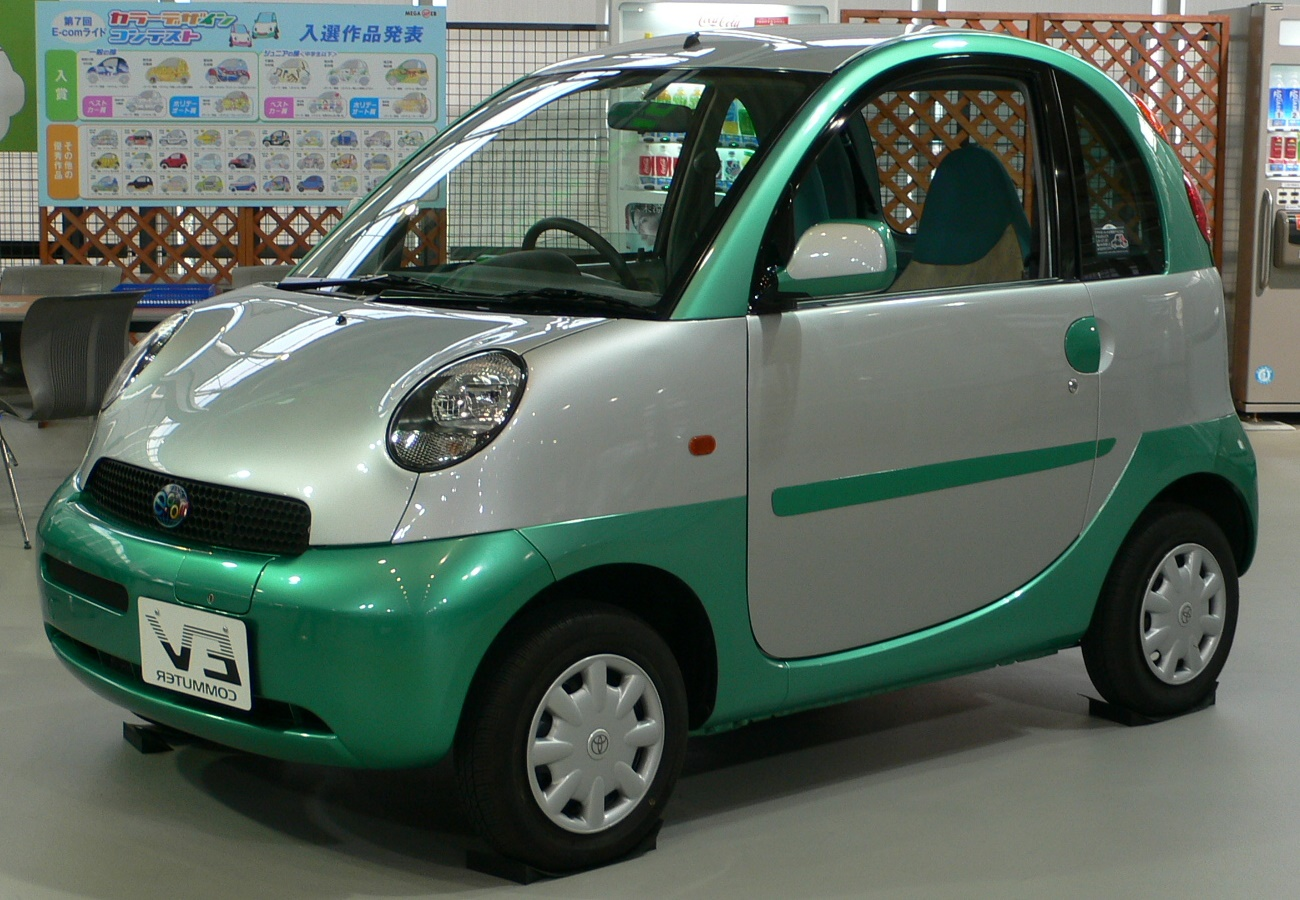

Overview
- Manufacturer: Toyota
- Production: 1997 (30 units)

Body and chassis
- Class: Kei car
- Body style: 3-door hatchback
- Layout: Front-motor, front-wheel-drive

Powertrain
- Electric motor: 18.5 kW (25 hp; 25 PS) permanent magnet synchronous
- Battery: Nickel–hydrogen
- Electric range: 100 km (62 mi)

Dimensions
- Wheelbase: 1,800 mm (70.9 in)
- Length: 2,790 mm (109.8 in)
- Width: 1,475 mm (58.1 in)
- Height: 1,605 mm (63.2 in)
- Curb weight: 770 kg (1,698 lb)

Chronology
- Successor: Toyota eQ; Toyota C+pod

The Toyota eCom is an electric vehicle (EV) that Toyota first demonstrated at the 1997 Tokyo Motor Show. The premise of the eCom was not to be just a small car, but a car available to everybody that had a special electronic card instead of a key, promoting carpooling. It was seen in various car shows and demonstrations in three color schemes, one being white with blue fringes, another gold with blue fringes and the third very similar to the first with green-blue fringes.

Thirty eComs were made and stations were set up for rental in Toyota City as part of the "Toyota Crayon" project and an additional twenty were rented to the Tama New Town experimental community transportation project near Tokyo.

Toyota Motor Sales USA joined with the University of California, Irvine and other partners to demonstrate the shared use of electric cars utilizing the eCom, Toyota's 2-passenger personal transport EV. Participants include companies located in University Research Park, a commercial park next to the university. Along with sharing cars, the "Living Power Park Laboratory" would investigate breakthrough concepts in urban design, electricity generated by stationary fuel cells, and use of a micro power grid to distribute electricity. A fleet of eComs were used for short-distance shared-usage driving and commuting.

The eCom and cars like it were pulled from Toyota's widespread lineup not long after for financial reasons.

== See also ==
- Toyota C+pod
- Toyota eQ
