= Toyota Auto Body =

Manufacturing subsidiary of the Toyota group based in Japan

Toyota Auto Body Co., Ltd.

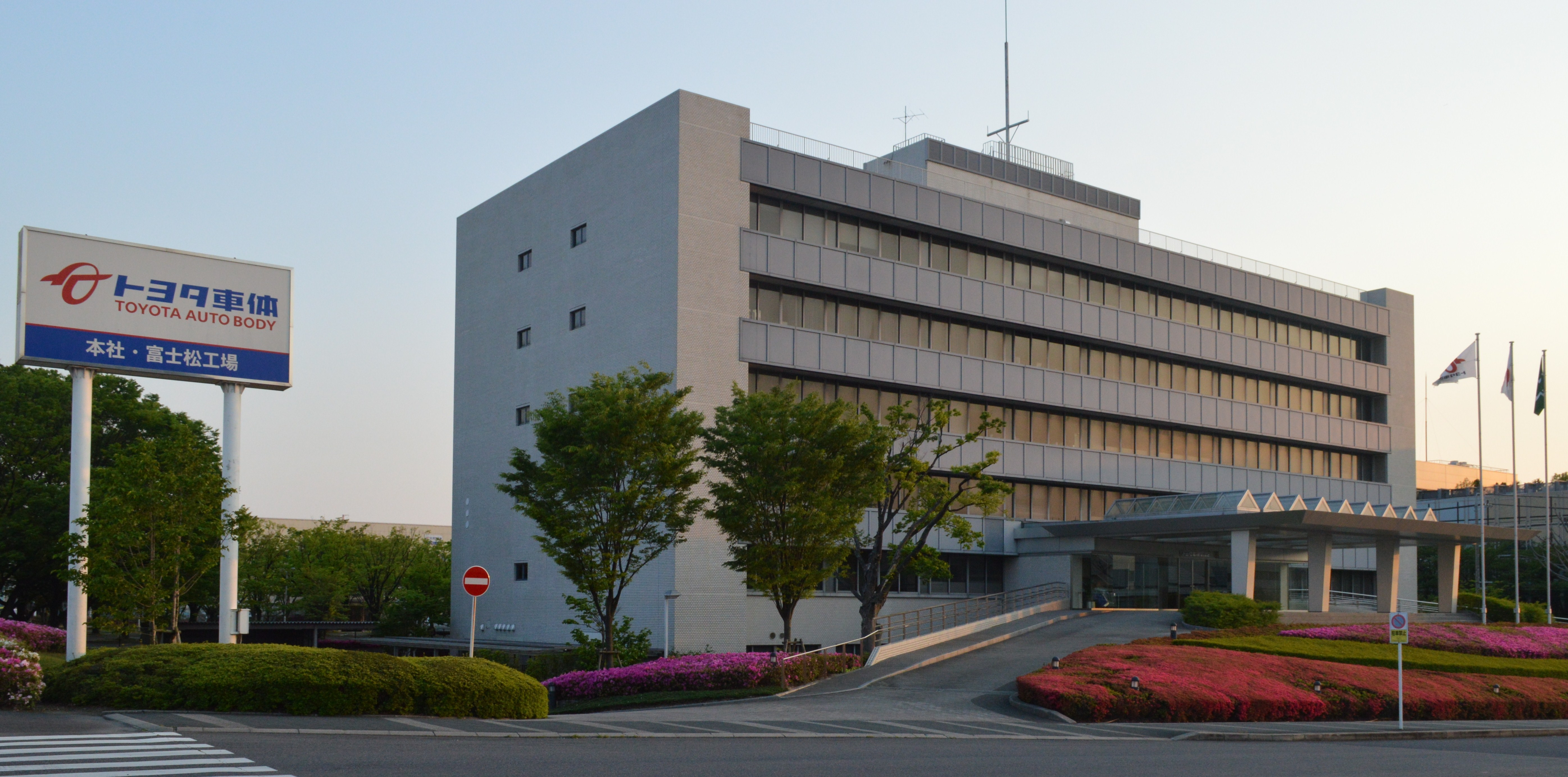
- Trade name: Toyota Auto Body
- Native name: トヨタ車体株式会社
- Romanized name: Toyota Shatai Kabushiki-gaisha
- Formerly: Toyota Auto Body Industries Co., Ltd.
- Type: Subsidiary
- Industry: Automotive
- Predecessor: Toyota's Kariya Plant auto body division
- Founded: 31 August 1945; 80 years ago
- Headquarters: Kariya, Aichi, Japan
- Key people: Katsuhiro Matsuo (President)
- Products: Cars, auto parts
- Production output: About 619,000 vehicles (2019)
- Revenue: ▲¥1,991.69 billion (FY2022)
- Operating income: ▲¥72.72 billion (FY2022)
- Net income: ▲¥55.11 billion (FY2022)
- Total assets: ▼¥551.92 billion (FY2022)
- Total equity: ▼¥195.70 billion (FY2022)
- Number of employees: 19,206 (March 2021, consolidated)
- Parent: Toyota Motor Corporation
- Subsidiaries: Gifu Auto Body Co., Ltd.; Toyota Auto Body Research and Development Co., Ltd.; Tokai Utility Motor Co., Ltd.
- Website: www.toyota-body.co.jp
- Footnotes; Fiscal Year 2022 (FY2022) in this article is from 1 April 2022 to 31 March 2023. References

Toyota Auto Body (Japanese: トヨタ車体) is a manufacturing subsidiary of the Toyota group based in Japan. It is headquartered in Kariya, Aichi and was established in 1945. The company has plants in the Mie and Aichi prefectures and other facilities around Japan and abroad.

The company was formed through a corporate spin-off from Toyota. In its early years, it produced auto bodies. In the late 1950s and early 1960s, it centred on truck production, before slowly switching focus to light vehicles (mostly vans) from the late 1960s onwards. In the 2000s, it absorbed the vehicle manufacturing operations of sister companies Araco and Gifu Auto Body.

As part of Toyota, Toyota Auto Body develops and produces a range of minivans, SUVs, light commercial vehicles and auto parts.

== History ==
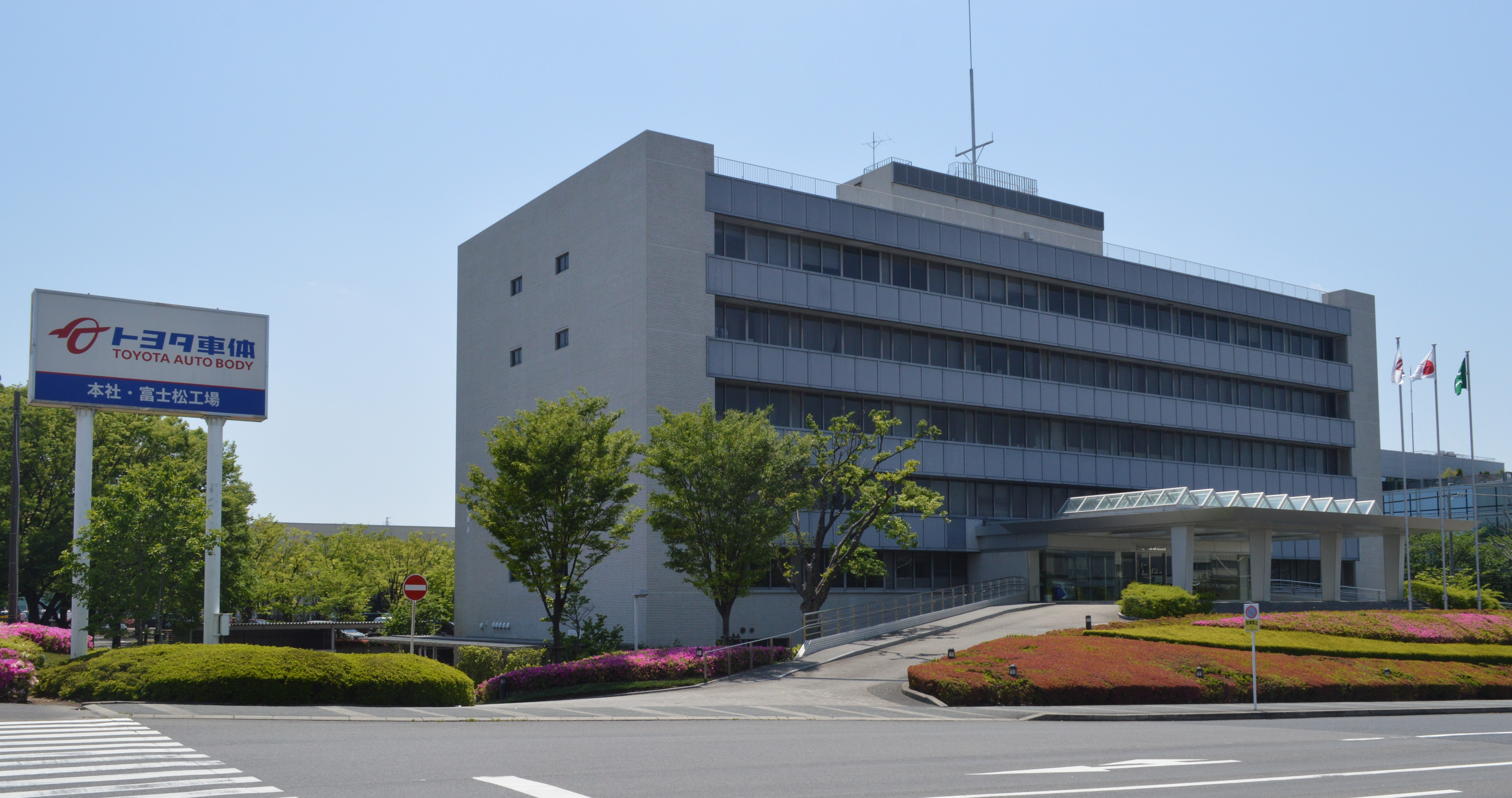
Headquarters in Kariya, Japan

Toyota Auto Body was established on 31 August 1945 as a corporate spin-off of Toyota Motor Industry's Kariya plant with the name Toyota Auto Body Industries (トヨタ車体工業, Toyota Shatai Kōgyō). At first, it produced auto bodies for Toyota. In 1951, the company became the first Japanese manufacturer in producing a truck body made completely of steel. In 1953, the company adopted its present name. In January 1957, it opened an assembly facility in Kariya for mass-producing trucks. In November 1959, it created a vehicle conversion subsidiary, Kariya Painting (later renamed Tokai Utility Motor).

In the early 1960s, Toyota gave clear functions to some of its then itaku (subcontracting) companies: Toyota Auto Body was centred on producing trucks; Kanto Auto Works passenger vans and pickups; Arakawa Auto Body Land Cruisers and special vehicles. In 1960, Toyota Auto Body produced 74,000 trucks (including large trucks, the Stout, the ToyoAce), an 87% of Toyota's overall truck production and a 48% of its total vehicle production. In 1964, truck production from Toyota Auto Body (large trucks, the Stout, the ToyoAce, the Dyna) rose to 116,000 trucks, comprising 90% of Toyota's truck production and 27% of all vehicles.

In January 1964, Toyota Auto Body opened a second assembly facility in Kariya, the Fujimatsu plant, which produced the first Japanese hard-top car during the 1960s, the Corona Hard-top. The company also became the first itaku in assembling mass-produced passenger cars. The production percentage of passenger cars and other light vehicles would increase for the company during the following years. In the late 1960s, Toyota Auto Body led the development of a small van with a one-box design, similar to European ones at the time, but, according to former Toyota senior employee Akira Kawahara, something yet unseen in the Japanese industry. In 1967, Toyota Auto Body began producing the van, named as HiAce. It became the most produced model from the company with more than 6 million units as of April 2017. Toyota Auto Body would continue developing and producing one-box design vans. In 1970, Toyota Auto Body production was 149,000 passenger cars and 142,000 commercial vehicles (trucks and buses), although the actual percentage declined to 17.6% of Toyota's total vehicle production.

In the 1970s, Toyota Auto Body was one of the first companies in using quality function deployment (QFD), paralleling the initial developments from Yoji Akao at Mitsubishi Heavy Industries. The rest of the Toyota group adopted the method in 1979. The improvements of Toyota Auto Body on QFD influenced Ford into adopting it.

In 1992, the company established Toyota Body Seiko, an auto parts subsidiary, and began investments to increase the production of one-box vehicles, as the rest of its passenger car business was in decline. In December 1993, Toyota Auto Body opened the van-focused Inabe plant. By the mid-1990s, Toyota Auto Body ventured into the production of high-end one-box passenger vans derived from the HiAce. In 1995, it started producing the Granvia, a HiAce-based semi-bonneted van made to comply with European safety regulations. From the Granvia the company developed the Alphard which was launched in 2002. In 2008, it introduced an Alphard twin vehicle, the Vellfire.

In May 2001, Toyota announced it would consolidate all production of one-box Toyota-badged cars intended for the Japanese market into Toyota Auto Body by moving the assembly of the LiteAce/TownAce Noah and its successor (Noah) from Daihatsu. In 2004, Toyota Auto Body incorporated the auto body and vehicle production businesses from Araco. In 2005, the Kariya plant was repurposed for converting vehicles instead of producing trucks. In the fiscal year ended March 2007, Toyota Auto Body achieved its largest production volume, with about 745,000 vehicles produced during the period. In 2007, Gifu Auto Body became a wholly owned subsidiary of Toyota Auto Body.

In November 2018, Toyota announced it would transfer all van development to Toyota Auto Body. In 2019, Toyota Auto Body announced it would produce the first Lexus-badged passenger van at its Inabe plant, the Lexus LM, a badge engineered Alphard, the second Lexus product coming from the company after the Land Cruiser-based Lexus LX (the latter a legacy product from Araco).

In December 2022, Toyota Auto Body signed an agreement by which it planned to sell shares of Toyota Body Seiko to Toyota Boshoku, a minority shareholder, by October 2023, increasing the latter's ownership to a 66.4% controlling stake. After the transaction was completed, Toyota Body Seiko became a subsidiary of Toyota Boshoku instead of Toyota Auto Body and changed its name to Toyota Boshoku Seiko. Toyota Boshoku may turn Toyota Boshoku Seiko into a wholly owned subsidiary at a later date.

In the early 2020s, the company opened specialty stores for customising and selling accessories of its produced vehicles. In January 2023, it pre-opened a Land Cruiser customisation and services store in Kariya, operated by Tokai Utility Motor, and called Land Cruiser Base (ランクルBase) (Note: ランクル (Rankuru) is a common abbreviation for Land Cruiser (ランドクルーザー, Rando Kurūzā) used in Japan, especially referring to older models.) to be fully operational by mid-2023. In June 2023, it opened another for its commercial vehicle range in Fukagawa, Tokyo (within the Toyota Mobility Tokyo store), which is called Cargo Base.

In April 2024, Toyota Auto Body fully resumed production after several of its assembly lines were halted for over a month as a result of an investigation into Toyota Industries-supplied diesel engines.

Toyota Auto Body was a public company until late 2011, when Toyota made it a wholly owned subsidiary and delisted its shares.

== Facilities ==
=== Vehicle assembly and management ===
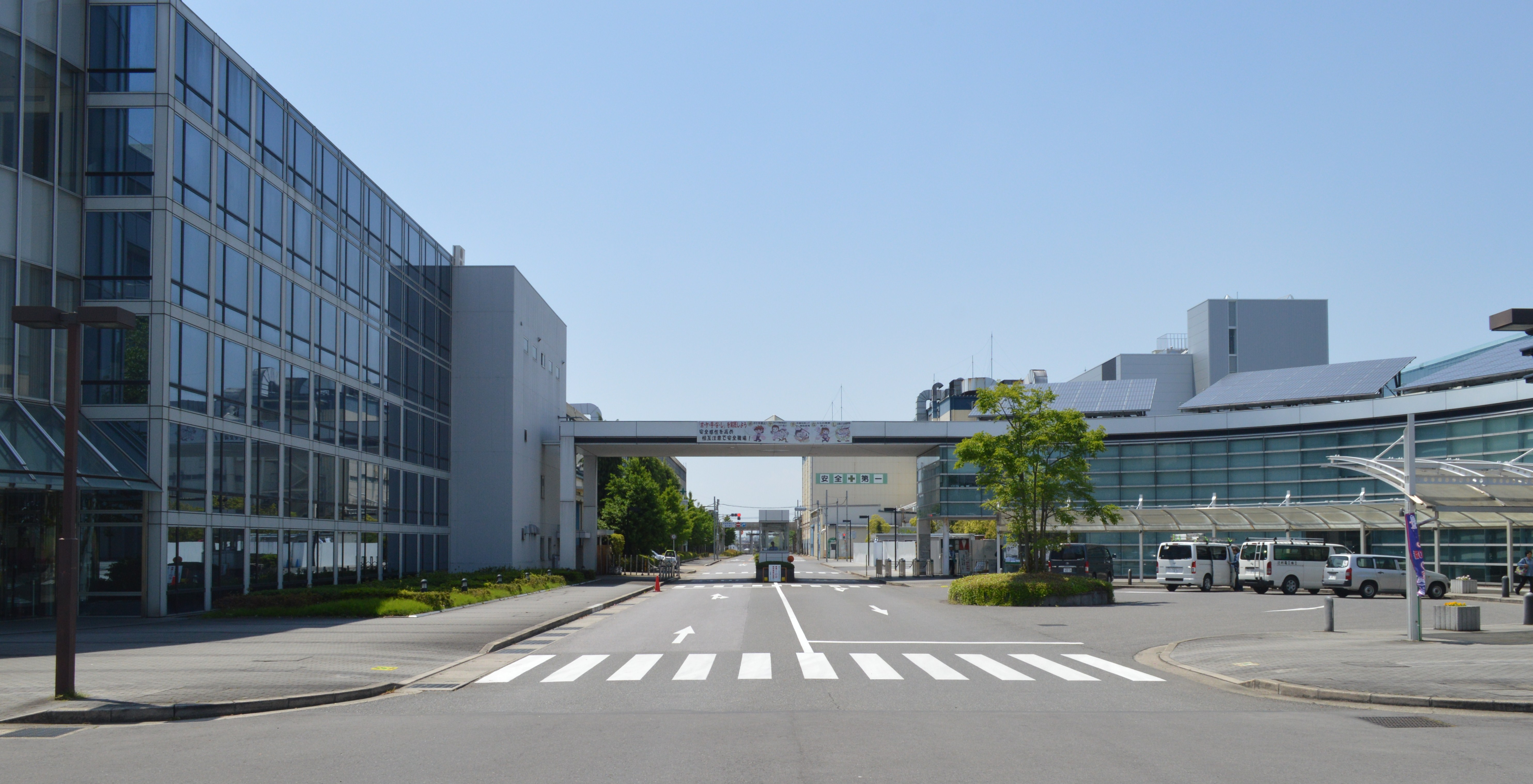
Fujimatsu plant

Toyota Auto Body assembly plants are Fujimatsu (Ichiriyama, Kariya, Aichi), Inabe (Inabe, Mie), Yoshiwara (Yoshiwara, Toyota, Aichi), Kariya (Showa, Kariya, Aichi). There is a development centre in Toyota, Aichi (Kotobuki New Development Centre). The head offices are in Kariya, Aichi. Additional offices are located in Tokyo and Osaka.

The Fujimatsu plant covers a 436,700 square metres (m^{2}) area and was established in January 1964. The present Kariya plant, covering 99,100 m^{2}, was established in 1957. Both plant produce vehicles, but Fujimatsu is mostly focused on minivans and Kariya on electric vehicles. As of March 2017, the plants had a combined workforce of 3,139 (281 of them working at the Kariya plant). The Inabe plant is the main minivan production hub of Toyota Auto Body. It covers 800,500 m^{2} and was established in December 1993. As of March 2017, it had 2,266 employees. The Yoshiwara plant produces body-on-frame vehicles. It covers 196,200 m^{2} and was established in 1962. As of March 2017, it had 2,337 employees. By the 1999 fiscal year, all Toyota Auto Body plants got the ISO 14001 certification. The company's plants use the Toyota Production System.

Toyota Auto Body's Gifu Auto Body headquarters and facilities are in Unuma Mitsuike, Kakamigahara, Gifu. Its facilities cover 163,000 m^{2}. As of March 2019, the company had 2,565 employees.

=== Other facilities ===
Toyota Auto Body Research and Development (トヨタ車体研究所, Toyota Shatai Kenkyūjo) is Toyota Auto Body wholly owned research and development subsidiary. It is headquartered in Kirishima, Kagoshima and was established in 1990. Toyota Auto Body made design and development work for Toyota from the early 1960s, and, together with Toyota and sister itaku companies, formed part of ATODE (All TOyota DEsign), a group formed in December 1960 aimed at securing a consistent styling for Toyota-badged vehicles. The Toyota Auto Body's design branch became an autonomous part of the company in 1978. The present Toyota Auto Body Research and Development subsidiary has a 5,719 m^{2} building and 403 employees.

Tokai Utility Motor has facilities in Anjō, Kariya, and Inabe.

=== Overseas subsidiaries ===
Toyota Auto Body has subsidiaries in Indonesia, Taiwan, Thailand, Malaysia, China and the United States.

Most Toyota Auto Body's affiliates outside Japan are joint ventures. The Taoyuan-based Taiwanese affiliate is called Chun Shyang Shin Yeh (Industry) (Chinese: 春翔欣業; pinyin: Chūn Xiáng Xīn Yè) and was established in 1997. It is a joint venture between Toyota Auto Body and Chun Yuan Steel, a Taiwanese steel manufacturer. The joint venture produces pressed parts, vehicle doors and suspension components for Toyota cars. Toyota Auto Body owns a 51% stake. In Thailand, Toyota Auto Body's first Thai operations began in February 1978, producing stamped parts for Hilux pickups. Toyota Auto Body Thailand officially started activities in 1979, as a stamped auto parts producer. In 1988, it formed a joint venture with Toyota Motor Thailand called Toyota (formerly Thai) Auto Works. The venture is focused on producing the HiAce. Toyota Auto Body owns a 63% stake. Both Thai ventures have plants in Samutprakan: the Samrong plant (Toyota Auto Body Thailand) and the Teparak plant (Toyota Auto Works). In 2004, Toyota Auto Body established a joint venture called Thai Auto Conversion aimed at producing specially equipped vehicles.

Toyota Auto Body also has various joint ventures in Indonesia. In 1995, it established, along with other Toyota subsidiaries, Sugity Creatives, an Indonesian joint venture headquartered in Cikarang Bekasi and aimed at producing resin components for cars. From late 2012 to 2016 it produced vehicles, including the Noah (rebadged as NAV1). Toyota Auto Body owns an 88.52% of the venture. Toyota Auto Body also has stakes in the joint ventures Toyota Auto Body-Tokai Extrusion and Resin Plating Technology, both producing auto parts. As for China, Toyota Auto Body has a 65%-owned Chinese joint venture, Tab Minth Mobility Equipment, to "sell assistive components".

The rest of the Toyota Auto Body's overseas affiliates are wholly owned subsidiaries. These are the Malaysian auto parts producer Toyota Auto Body Malaysia (established in 2005) and the American Auto Parts Manufacturing Mississippi (established in 2011).

== Products ==
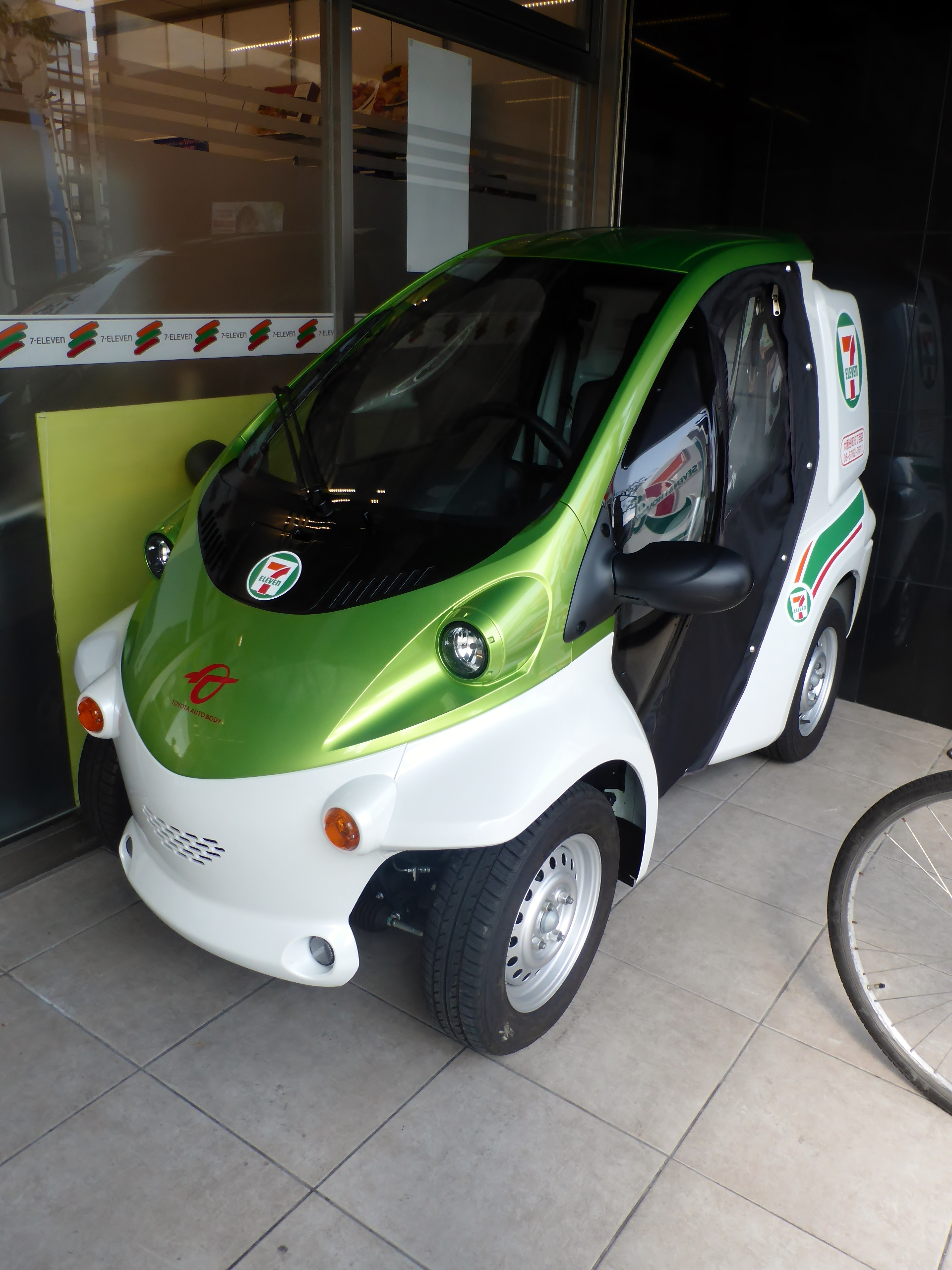
A COMS

As of 2022 vehicles assembled by Toyota Auto Body include: the Alphard, the Vellfire, the Voxy, the Noah, the Land Cruiser, the HiAce, the RegiusAce, the GranAce, the Coaster, the electric vehicle COMS, the Lexus LX and LM.

Toyota Auto Body production by plant as of early 2022
Plant	Products
Fujimatsu (Honsha) plant	Voxy, Noah, Alphard, Land Cruiser 70
Kariya plant	COMS, vehicle conversion
Inabe plant	HiAce, GranAce, RegiusAce, Alphard, Vellfire, Lexus LM
Yoshiwara plant	Land Cruiser 300, Land Cruiser 70, Lexus LX (J310)
Kakamigahara (Honsha) plant	HiAce, Coaster, vehicle conversion
Notes
Plants with blue background are directly controlled by Toyota Auto Body, plants with light blue background are directly controlled by Toyota Auto Body and formerly belonged to Araco, plants with light red background are indirectly controlled by Toyota Auto Body through its subsidiary Gifu Auto Body

== Absorbed operations ==
=== Araco ===
Araco Corporation (アラコ株式会社, Arako Kabushiki-gaisha) was one of the first manufacturing subsidiaries of Toyota. It was established in 1946 (incorporated July 1947) at Nagoya by a former Toyota Industries sheet metal worker named Gihee Arakawa as Arakawa Sheet Metal Industries (荒川鈑金工業, Arakawa Bankin Kōgyō). The company firstly made sheet metal work for Toyota, soon adding vehicle interior parts (including seats) and auto bodies. In 1953, it started assembling the Toyota BJ, and later the successive Land Cruisers. The Arakawa-assembled Land Cruiser was the main export product from Toyota in the late 1950s and early 1960s (28% of all vehicle exports in the period 1956–1964). In 1960, it entered into production the RK160B (Coaster). The company opened two new plants around Toyota City during the 1960s: Kotobuki (1960) and Yoshiwara (1962). It was renamed as Arakawa Auto Body Industries (荒川車体工業, Arakawa Shatai Kōgyō) in 1961, before adopting the Araco name in 1988. In 1995, the company began assembling Lexus vehicles. In 2004, Araco activities were split and the auto body and vehicle production operations became part of Toyota Auto Body. The vehicle interior business was merged into Toyota Boshoku.

A different Toyota subsidiary established in 1974 as Kyoei Sangyo (協栄産業, Kyōei Sangyō) was renamed as Kyoei Araco in 2004 and as Araco in 2015. This Araco specialises on seats for Lexus vehicles.

=== Gifu Auto Body ===
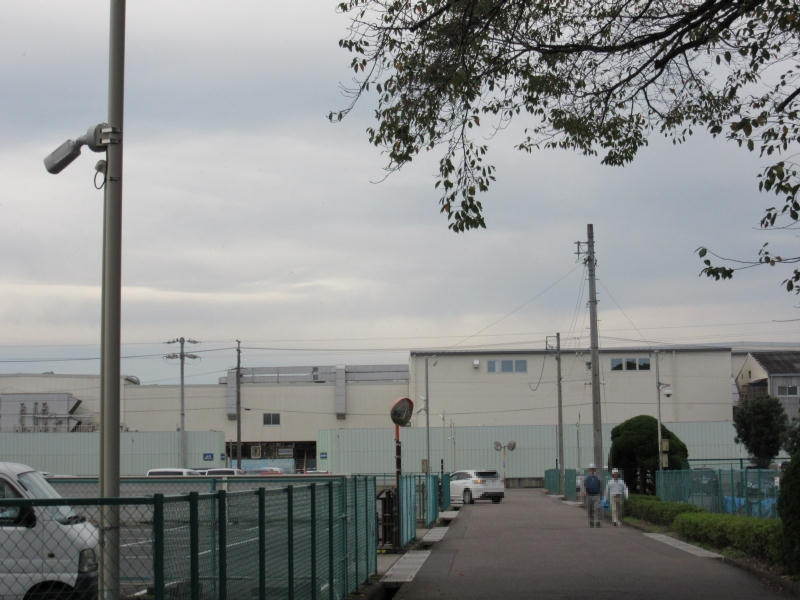
Gifu Auto Body facilities, pictured in 2017

Gifu Auto Body Co. Ltd. (岐阜車体工業株式会社, Gifu Shatai Kōgyō Kabushiki-gaisha) is a Gifu-based vehicle manufacturer. It was established in 1940 as a truck body manufacturer. In 1959, after receiving a big order of military vehicles from Toyota, it associated itself with the latter, producing bodies for light trucks such as the Dyna and the Stout. In the 1960s, Gifu Auto Body hand-built the Land Cruiser FJ45V, a long wheelbase variant of the third-generation Land Cruiser. Up until 1967, the company's production was focused on the Land Cruiser model and light trucks. That year, Toyota consolidated all Land Cruiser assembly in Japan into Arakawa Auto Body Industries. From 1967 onwards, the main focus of Gifu Auto Body became the production of light trucks and the HiAce until Toyota transferred truck production to Hino Motors in 1998. In January 1996, Toyota launched a civilian version of the BXD10 military vehicle called BXD20 (Mega Cruiser), and it was assembled by Gifu Auto Body. Production ended in August 2001.

By 2007, Gifu Auto Body was producing the HiAce and auto parts (pressed parts and truck seats). That year, it became a wholly owned subsidiary of Toyota Auto Body through stock swap. In July 2015, Gifu Auto Body transferred its auto parts business to Toyota Body Seiko in order to focus on commercial vehicle assembly. In December 2016, Toyota Auto Body moved production of the Coaster from its Yoshiwara plant to Gifu Auto Body.

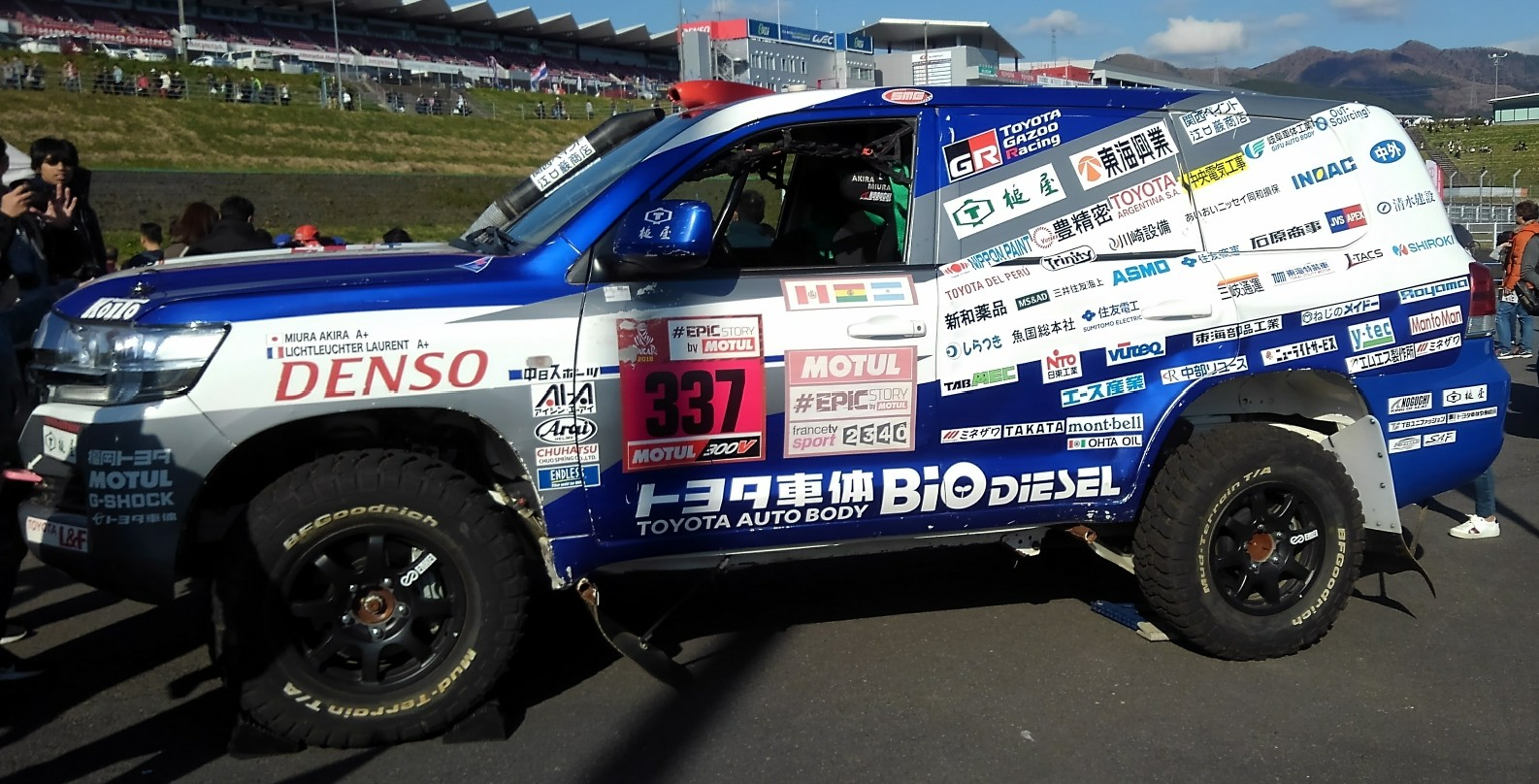
2018 TLC Rally Dakar contender

== Sports ==
An Araco team entered Land Cruisers into the Rally Dakar from 1995 onwards. In 2005, the team was renamed as Team Land Cruiser · Toyota Auto Body (TLC). As of 2024, it has achieved eleven consecutive victories in the diesel production car class. The company entered a HiAce into the 2023 Toyota Gazoo Racing Rally Challenge. The HiAce rally version was built on a GDH201V chassis modified by Cast (a HiAce tuning division of the Sanko Works company) and it was run by Toyota Auto Body's own team, Toyota Auto Body Team Hiace. Cast had already entered a couple of HiAces into the 2021 All-Japan Rally Championship.

Toyota Auto Body has two company teams participating in Japanese national sports championships: the volleyball team Toyota Auto Body Queenseis and the handball team Toyota Auto Body Brave Kings.

As of 2024, Gifu Auto Body is sponsor of FC Gifu.
