= EComXpo =

Virtual tradeshow

eComXpo
- Official eComXpo Logo
- Status: Active
- Genre: eCommerce trade show
- Venue: Virtual
- Location: Internet
- Inaugurated: 2005
- Attendance: 8,200 in March 2007
- Organizer: John Grosshandler
- Filing status: For profit
- Website: www.eComXpo.com

eComXpo virtual experience: screen shot of one of the exhibit halls during the live conference (eComXpo March 2006)

eComXpo is a free online virtual tradeshow for search, affiliate and internet marketers. Visitors have the ability to engage other visitors of the conference directly and communicate with each other and exchange contact information with exhibitors and other visitors. Those are common activities from real world trade shows, transported to the Internet.

== Overview ==
European presence was strong in the inaugural show. Participants cited the savings of time and money that online trade shows provide as the reason for their participation. Exhibitors treat the online event just like a normal convention in the real world.

The panel discussions are broadcast via Internet radio by WebMasterRadio.fm and available in MP3 format and as a podcast XML feed.

== History ==
The company eComXpo, LLC was founded on July 14, 2004, by John Grosshandler. The corporate headquarters is in Bannockburn, Illinois. The first eComXpo was held between February 17, 2005, and February 19, 2005, and had an estimated 1,600 attendees, 92 exhibitors and 75 presentations by industry experts. The conference was acquired by Worldwide Business Research in 2008. WBR combined eComXpo with their eTail virtual tradeshow, which was held for the first time in July 2008, using again the InXpo platform.
