= Toyota COMS =

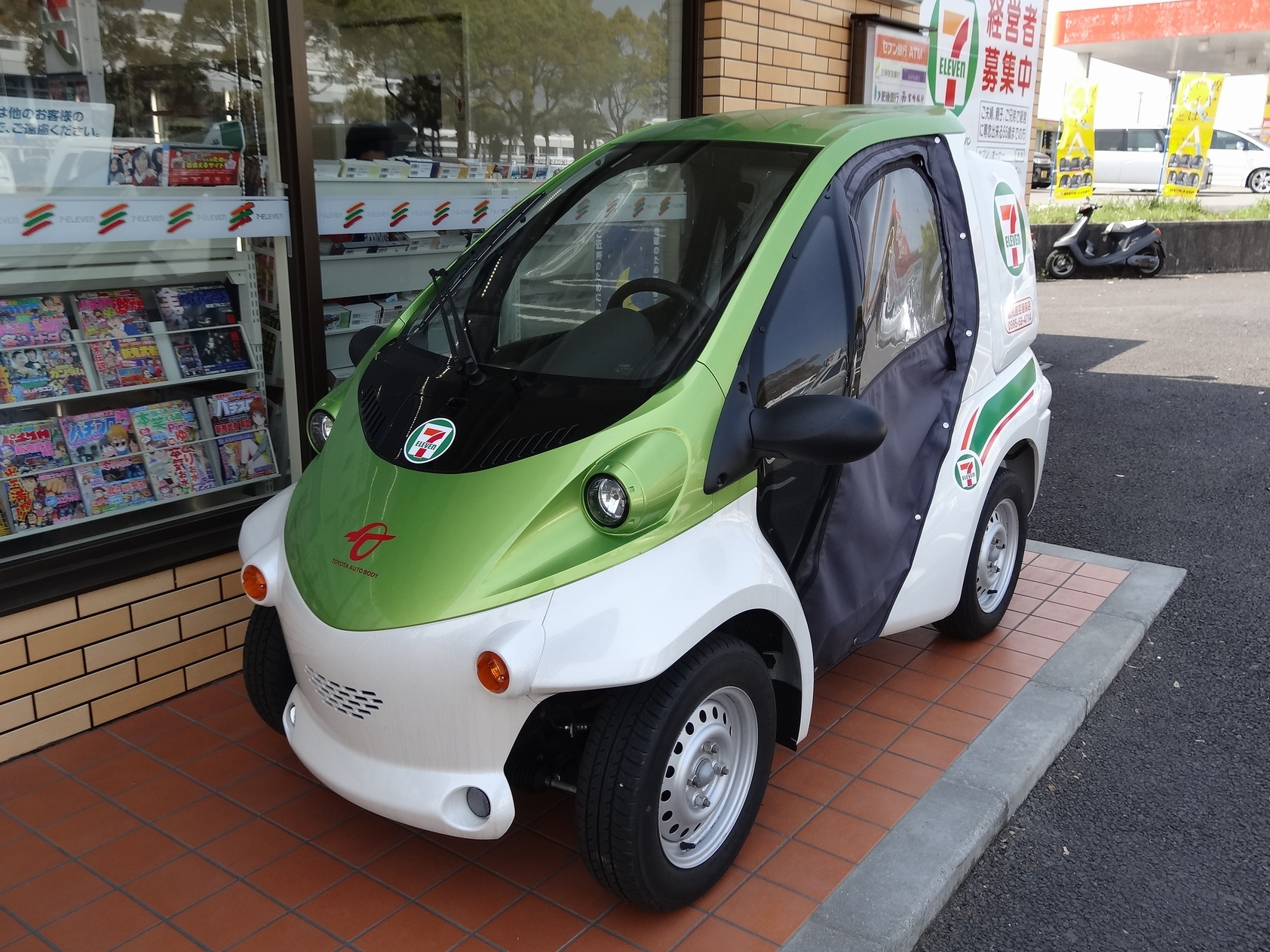
- A second-generation COMS (B-COM trim)

Overview
- Manufacturer: Toyota Auto Body
- Also called: Everyday COMS (1st gen); CU Toyota Ha:mo (2nd gen; Thailand)
- Production: 2000–2011 (1st gen); 2012–present (2nd gen)
- Assembly: Japan: Toyota, Aichi (1st gen); Japan: Kariya, Aichi (1st & 2nd gen)

Body and chassis
- Class: Microcar
- Body style: 2-door hatchback
- Layout: Rear-motor, rear-wheel-drive

Powertrain
- Electric motor: 2 x 2 kW permanent-magnet synchronous motor (1st gen); 5 kW permanent-magnet synchronous motor (2nd gen)
- Transmission: Single gear
- Battery: Lead-acid batteries
- Electric range: 35 km (22 mi)–45 km (28 mi) (manufacturer estimate, 1st gen); 50 km (31 mi) (JC08, 2nd gen)

Dimensions
- Curb weight: 270 kg (595 lb) (1st gen); 420–430 kg (926–948 lb) (2nd gen)

The Toyota COMS is a single-seater electric microcar produced by Toyota Auto Body. The first generation was introduced by Araco in 2000. In 2012, Toyota Auto Body launched a second generation.

COMS is an acronym for Chotto Odekake Machimade Suisui (ちょっとおでかけ街までスイスイ), which roughly translates to "a smooth little excursion to the city."

== History and technical details ==
=== First generation ===
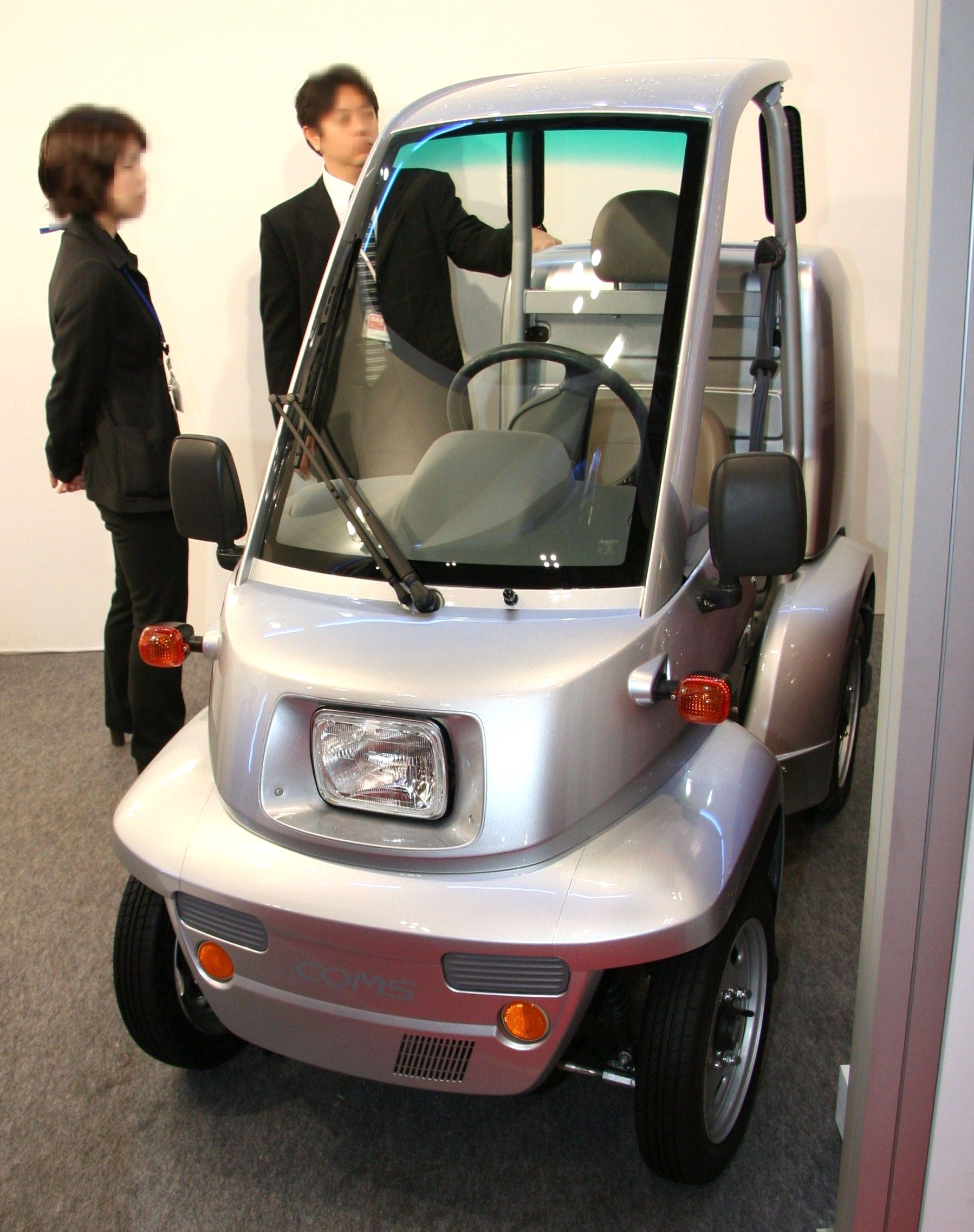
First-generation COMS

The first-generation COMS was introduced by Araco in June 2000.

The car has a maximum speed of 50 km/h (31 mph). Its estimated maximum range is 35 or 45 kilometres depending on specs, and the battery is fully charged in 8, 10, or 13 hours using a 100 V home grid. The battery pack is made up of six 12 V lead-acid batteries, which provide 32 Ah of power for the 35-kilometre (22 mi) range models and 52 Ah of power for the 45-kilometre (28 mi) range models. The car has two hub motors, each capable of 2 kW (2.7 PS), in the rear wheels, and drum brakes on both axles. It utilises resin bodywork and an aluminium frame to reduce weight to 270 kg (600 lb).

The COMS has two trims: basic (with a roof) and open (without a roof). The basic trim has two models, the AK10E and AK15E (the latter of which is the only model with a 45-kilometre (28 mi) range). The open trim has a single model, the AK11E.

This generation sold about 2,000 units.

=== Second generation ===
A show car of the second-generation COMS was unveiled at the 2007 Tokyo Motor Show, with the production version being introduced by Toyota Auto Body in July 2012.

The car has a full-charge range of 50 kilometres under JC08, and fully charges in about 6 hours using a 100 V home grid. It has a maximum speed of 60 km/h (37 mph). The single motor delivers a power of 5 kilowatts (6.8 PS) to the rear wheels, with a torque output of 40 N⋅m (30 lb⋅ft). The 12 V lead-acid battery pack has a capacity of 52 Ah. The second-generation COMS also has various comfort improvements compared to its predecessor: a more comfortable ride, a driving position comparable to that of a larger car, and a turning radius of 3.2 metres. The car frame is made up of steel. The car's suspension is made up of MacPherson struts in the front and a beam axle in the rear, with front disc brakes and rear drum brakes.

While the production car only has one seat, there were plans to install an extra seat and seat belt in the cargo area that would "[convert] the COMS into a two-passenger vehicle allowed on public roads."

In Japan, the COMS is a light vehicle classified as a type 1 motorised quadricycle (原動機付自転車, gendōki-tsuki jitensha) (Note: The expression is usually translated into English as motorised bicycle, but the Japanese legal term also refers to three and four-wheeled vehicles.) according to the Road Transport Vehicle Act (道路運送車両法, Dōro Unsō Sharyō-hō) and as a minicar (ミニカー, minikā) according to the Road Traffic Act (道路交通法, Dōro Kōtsū-hō).

==== Trims and revisions ====
The second-generation COMS is offered in two trims: the P-COM for individual use and the B-COM for business use. The B-COM has three body variations: delivery, deck, and basic. The P-COM has a weight of 420 kg (930 lb), while the B-COM has a weight of 420–430 kg (930–950 lb).

In April 2022, Toyota Auto Body introduced a revised COMS. Most trims increased its loading capacity from 30 kg (66 lb) to 45 kg (99 lb) and B-COM's deck variant to up to 90 kg (200 lb). There were other minor changes as a longer charging cable and styling revisions.

In October 2022, the company launched a special limited version of the P-COM trim to commemorate the tenth anniversary of the COMS launching. The version's equipment includes aluminium wheels, sun visors and accessory sockets. It also has a two tone colouring scheme exclusive for the model as an optional.

==== Markets and sales ====
In Indonesia, the COMS is only used as a rental car for tourists in Nusa Dua, Bali, alongside the Toyota C+pod.

As of March 2022, the second-generation COMS has sold 9,500 units.

==== Concepts ====
In May 2022, Toyota Auto Body unveiled a COMS-derived concept car named as CN COMS Concept at the Automotive Engineering Exposition hold in Yokohama. The car has autonomous driving capabilities, a resin body with no painting on the outside, a simple cooler to counteract the heat that causes bottlenecks to microcars, doors and boot changed from a hard type material to a soft one to reduce weight. The dashboard was built with a plant-derived material developed by Toyota Auto Body called TABWD (Toyota Auto Body Wood) and made up of cider fibres and polypropylene. The material is aimed at replacing fibreglass. In May 2023, the company unveiled another concept car at the Automotive Engineering Exposition, called PLANT COM. This concept has the roof, fenders, and interior panels built with TABWD and other plant-derived materials.

At the 2023 Tokyo Auto Salon, Toyota Auto Body unveiled the Fun・COM Explorer concept. It is a roofless prototype off-road vehicle built from a second-hand COMS, with reinforced chassis and suspension.

== See also ==
- Toyota i-Road
- List of Toyota vehicles
