= Virtual engagement =

Digital customer interaction metric

Virtual engagement is any interaction between an organization and its audience that occurs through digital means. It is used in fields such as customer relationship management and digital communication strategies. Virtual environments are an important part of digital marketing strategies, helping businesses to measure audience participation and interest.

Industry analysts emphasize the importance of community engagement and note that “Businesses must focus on individual customer behavior to determine the effectiveness of their outreach efforts.”

== Virtual marketing communication ==
Advances in digital technologies have expanded the channels through which marketers interact with customers, requiring new metrics for online engagement. Virtual marketing is one of the latest developments in marketing communication. Virtual environments can affect how companies compete in changing markets.

For instance, by 2014, Facebook had reached over 1.2 billion monthly active users, which created opportunities for marketers to use a virtual platform to further connect and communicate with customers. They could identify preferences, tailor and target advertising, and create online conversations and communications. According to Ethel Claffey and Mairead Brady, word of mouth, or consumer-to-consumer (C2C) advertising, is widely considered to be very effective and beneficial to consumers because virtual spaces are where the mentioned peer-to-peer conversations naturally occur, enabling consumers to connect and influence one another directly. They can share personal experiences with the company, whether positive or negative. The effectiveness of this is seen with TripAdvisor, which is increasingly becoming a first choice for travel information and is impacting tourism operators' business both positively and negatively, depending on consumer reviews.

Traditional marketing strategies are becoming less effective in modern society, as the digital age has reshaped how marketers reach and engage their target audiences. Where marketing traditionally focused on the product, it is now more important for the business to focus on the buyer and the brand itself. Businesses cannot expect to communicate as they have in the past, where they would simply post pictures and descriptions of their products. Some researchers argue that marketing strategies have shifted in response to changes in digital consumer behavior. Savulescu raises the question of whether businesses should be able to advertise on social media, which is a place designed to contact peers and use as a form of leisure. For consumers, business advertising in these forums could be seen as intrusive, an invasion of privacy, or even unethical. This could affect the business's brand. While consumers generally accept that advertising is necessary for funding the social media sites that they use, they do not accept excessive and annoying advertising. Any of these advertisements may have reduced effectiveness or damage their connection to the target brand. Savulescu's question is a reminder to businesses that they should respect the forums as a place of peer-to-peer conversations and social leisure and ensure their presence in these forums is not overbearing or intrusive.

== In social media ==
Businesses often use virtual platforms such as Facebook to advertise to customers. Social media helps to categorize consumers by allowing them to join groups that identify their interests. This grants businesses self-selected market segmentation to target their advertising. Businesses can also use virtual engagement to contact consumers, gather feedback and market insights, and provide the information that consumers may need before they make a purchase. Some studies have examined how virtual engagement may influence consumer perceptions of brands.

Businesses also use competition to get the attention of possible customers. Often, these competitions are used to gain more followers by prompting social media users to like and share a post on their own profiles (therefore accessing a wider audience). Businesses are becoming increasingly creative with these competitions to maximize the effectiveness and benefits. For example, in 2014 National Geographic ran a competition titled "My Nat Geo Cover Shot" over Facebook. They asked fans to upload their own captioned photos and compete to win. This campaign not only gave consumers a sense that they were National Geographic photographers but also provided National Geographic with extensive information about its customers, their travel behaviors, photo techniques, and more.

The use of social media has become a marketing strategy adopted by many industries. For instance, Tourism was once dominated by travel agents and travel brochures, but now by online forums and booking sites. Tourism companies now have an easy platform to post photos that inspire and attract consumers. Social media can be used to provide consumers with information on holiday destinations and where to stay during their trip. Successful marketing strategies can also help consumers remember their time on past trips. One example of how tourism companies are using social media is NZ Rental Cars, which follows travel Instagram accounts, likes posts, and re-blogs them on its site to showcase landmarks in New Zealand to visit and attract customers.

Businesses can either choose to have paid or unpaid advertisements on social media. Unpaid advertisements sometimes include groups and competitions run by the company. Paid advertisements are usually either on the side of the screen or “sponsored,” depending on what the business pays for. According to Xie and Lee (2015), paid and unpaid advertisements have equal effects on consumers’ willingness to purchase from a particular brand.

== Role in Organizations ==
Virtual engagement is relatively new to businesses; although they can see the opportunity, it is hard to determine the return on investment of advertising in the virtual world. A study was conducted to determine the effects of social media advertising on consumers; the results showed that it is effective, particularly when used in combination with cross-channel advertising. Cross-channel advertising is when a business advertises across different channels, such as social media and magazines. Kumar et al. (2016) recommend that managers choose to embrace social networks as a means to further interact with customers and help build stronger relationships. They propose that this would lead to an increase in brand loyalty and customer spending. Xie and Lee (2015) recommend that managers invest in social media advertising with some hesitancy, since the direct results are still unclear. The authors also note that social media advertising is more likely to enhance brand image and foster brand loyalty than to drive sales of a particular product. This is because the advertisements will make consumers familiar with the brand, even if they do not need or want the specific product being advertised.

== See also ==
- Enshittification – Decline in online platform quality
- Enterprise engagement – Organizational growth strategy
- Mean world syndrome – Perceiving the world to be more dangerous than it really is
- Online advertising – Form of advertising that uses the Internet
- Perverse incentive – Incentive with unintended results
- Succès de scandale – Term meaning "success from scandal"
- Visual marketing
- Web traffic – Flow of data across the Web, the largest portion of Internet traffic
- Digital Marketing
