= Mitarai =

Mitarai (written: 御手洗) is a Japanese surname. The rough translation is "a place for a purification ceremony with water at the entrance to shrines and temples".

Notable people with the surname include:

- Fujio Mitarai (御手洗 冨士夫, born 1935), Japanese businessman
- Satomi Mitarai (御手洗 怜美, died 2004), Japanese murder victim
- Takeshi Mitarai (御手洗 毅, 1901–1984), Japanese businessman

Fictional Characters:

- Ryota Mitarai (御手洗 亮太|) A Character from Danganronpa 3: The End of Hope's Peak High School
- Shota Mitarai, a character in The Idolmaster 2 and The Idolmaster SideM
- Susugu Mitarai, a character in My Hero Academia

== Other uses ==
- Mitarai Dam, a rockfill dam in Kagoshima Prefecture
- Mitarai, a coastal town on Osaki Shimojima Island in the Seto Inland Sea.
- Mitarai valley, a mountain valley in the Yoshino-Kumano National Park, Kansai region
