= Canon Inc. =

Japanese multinational imaging corporation

- Logo since 1956

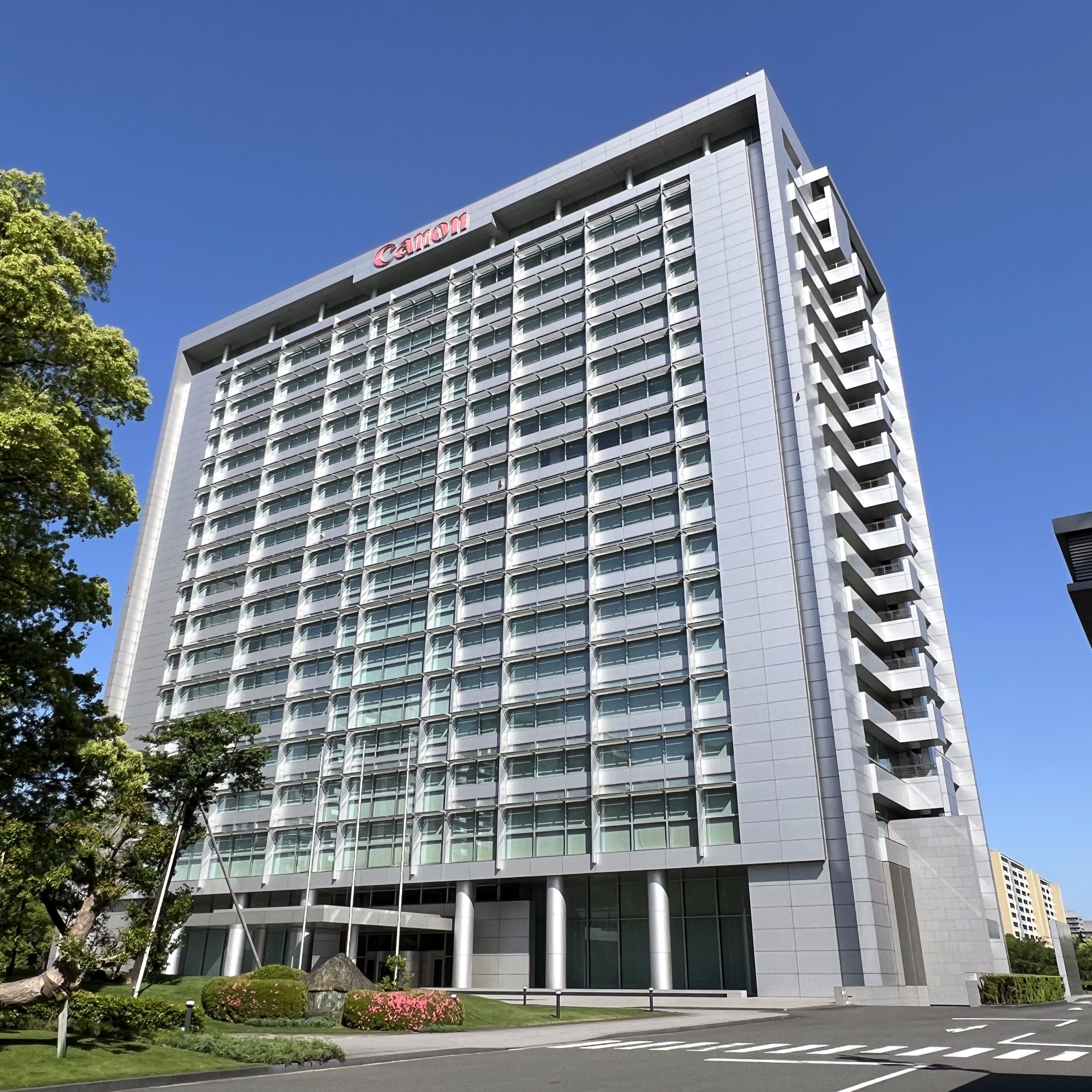
- Headquarters in Ōta, Tokyo
- Native name: キャノン株式会社
- Romanized name: Kyanon kabushiki gaisha
- Formerly: Precision Optical Industry Co. Ltd. (1933–1947); Canon Camera Co., Inc (1947–1969)
- Type: Public
- Traded as: TYO: 7751; NYSE: CAJ (until 2023); TOPIX Large 70 component; Nikkei 225 component
- Industry: Electronics
- Founded: 10 August 1937; 89 years ago (as Precision Optical Industry Co. Ltd. [精機光學研究所, Seikikōgaku kenkyūsho]); Tokyo, Japan
- Founder: Goro Yoshida; Saburo Uchida; Takeo Maeda
- Headquarters: Shimomaruko, Ōta, Tokyo, Japan
- Area served: Worldwide
- Key people: Fujio Mitarai (chairman & CEO)
- Products: (list of products); SLR cameras; Still cameras; Photocopiers; Digital cameras; Camcorders; Printers; Scanners; Binoculars; Lenses; LCDs; Ophthalmic instruments; Magnetic heads; Micro motors; Other office supplies
- Revenue: ▲¥4.03 trillion (US$30.31 billion) (2022)
- Operating income: ▲¥353.4 billion (US$2.66 billion) (2022)
- Net income: ▲¥352.4 billion (US$2.65 billion) (2022)
- Total assets: ▲¥5.1 trillion (US$38.31 billion) (2022)
- Total equity: ▲¥3.11 trillion (US$23.41 billion) (2022)
- Number of employees: 184,034 (2021)
- Divisions: Office Business Unit, Consumer Business Unit, Industry and Others Business Unit
- Subsidiaries: Canon Production Printing; Canon Tokki; Canon Medical Systems Corporation; Axis Communications; Milestone Systems
- Website: global.canon

Canon Inc. (Japanese: キャノン株式会社; (Note: In Japanese, the name is written Kiyanon (キヤノン) for visual balance, though it's pronounced Kyanon (キャノン, IPA: [kʲaꜜnoɴ]).) Hepburn: Kyanon kabushiki gaisha) is a Japanese multinational corporation headquartered in Ōta, Tokyo, specializing in optical, imaging, and industrial products, such as lenses, cameras, medical equipment, scanners, printers, and semiconductor manufacturing equipment.

Canon has a primary listing on the Tokyo Stock Exchange and is a constituent of the TOPIX Core 30 and Nikkei 225 indexes. It used to have a secondary listing on the New York Stock Exchange.

== Name ==
The company was originally named Seikikōgaku kenkyūsho (Japanese: 精機光学研究所, lit. 'Precision Optical Laboratory'). In 1934, it produced the Kwanon, a prototype for Japan's first-ever 35mm camera with a focal-plane-based shutter. In 1947, the company name was changed to Canon Camera Co., Inc., shortened to Canon Inc. in 1969. The name Canon comes from Buddhist bodhisattva Kannon (Japanese: 観音, lit. 'Guanyin'), previously transliterated as Kuanyin, Kwannon, or Canon in English.

== History ==
=== 1933–1970 ===
The origins of Canon date back to the founding of Precision Optical Instruments Laboratory in Japan in 1933 by Takeshi Mitarai, Goro Yoshida, Saburo Uchida and Takeo Maeda. It became the company Precision Optical Instruments, Co., Ltd. in 1937. During its early years, the company did not have any facilities to produce its own optical glass, and its first cameras incorporated Nikkor lenses from Nippon Kogaku K.K. (later, the Nikon Corporation).

Between 1933 and 1936, 'The Kwanon', a copy of the Leica design, Japan's first 35 mm focal-plane-shutter camera, was developed in prototype form. In 1940, Canon developed Japan's first indirect X-ray camera. Canon introduced a field zoom lens for television broadcasting in 1958, and in 1959 introduced the Reflex Zoom 8 and the Canonflex.

In 1961, Canon introduced the Rangefinder camera, Canon 7, and 50 mm 1:0.95 lens in a special bayonet mount. In 1964, Canon introduced the 'Canola 130', the first Japanese made 10-key calculator, a substantial improvement on the design of the British Bell Punch company, which introduced the first fully electronic calculator two years earlier with the Sumlock Anita Mark 8 unit. In 1965, Canon introduced the Canon Pellix, a single-lens reflex (SLR) camera with a semi-transparent stationary mirror which enabled the taking of pictures through the mirror.

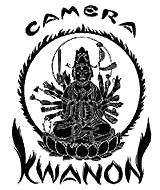
A logo from 1934 depicting Bodhisattva Kwan'on

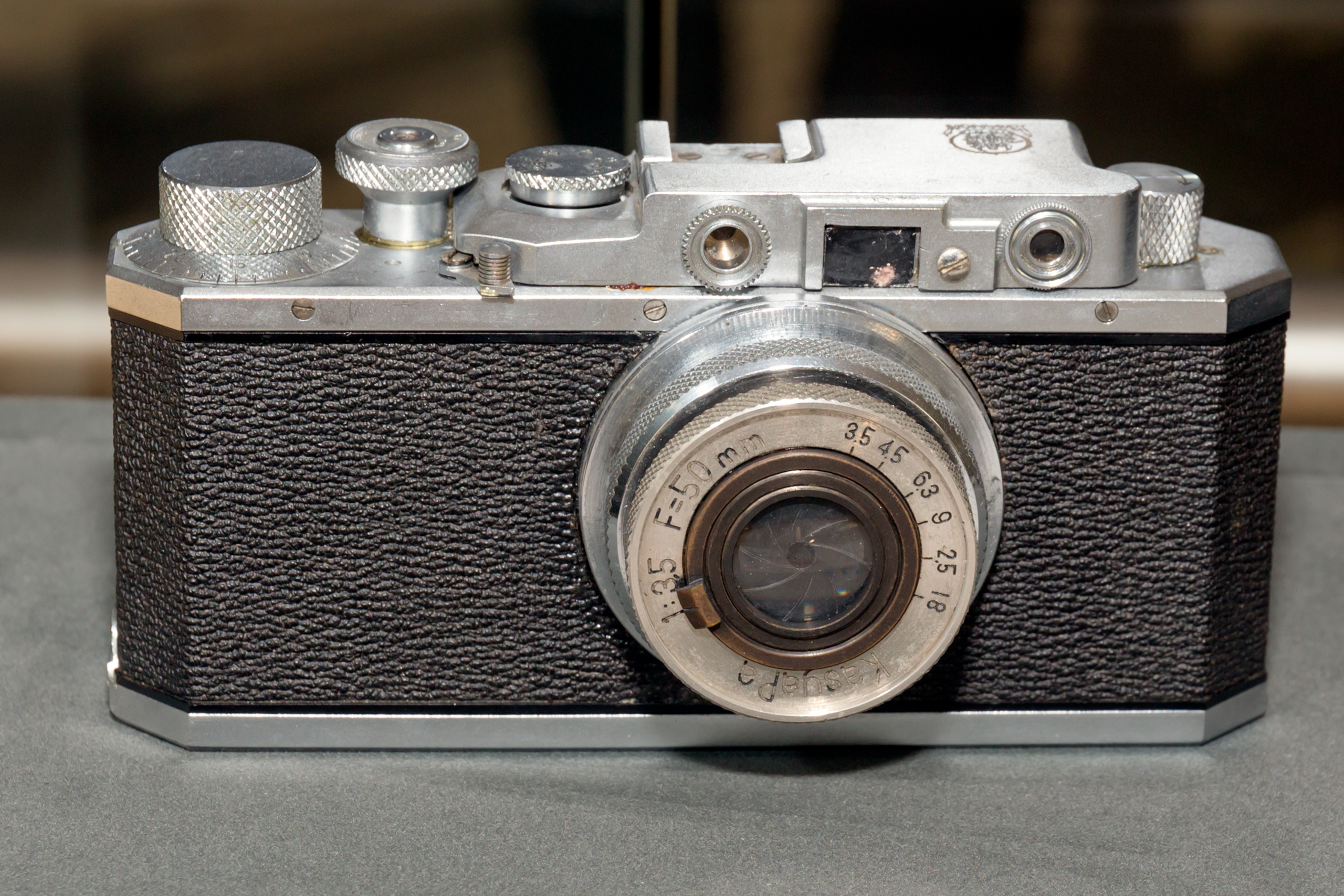
Kwanon camera (replica) with the Kasyapa lens

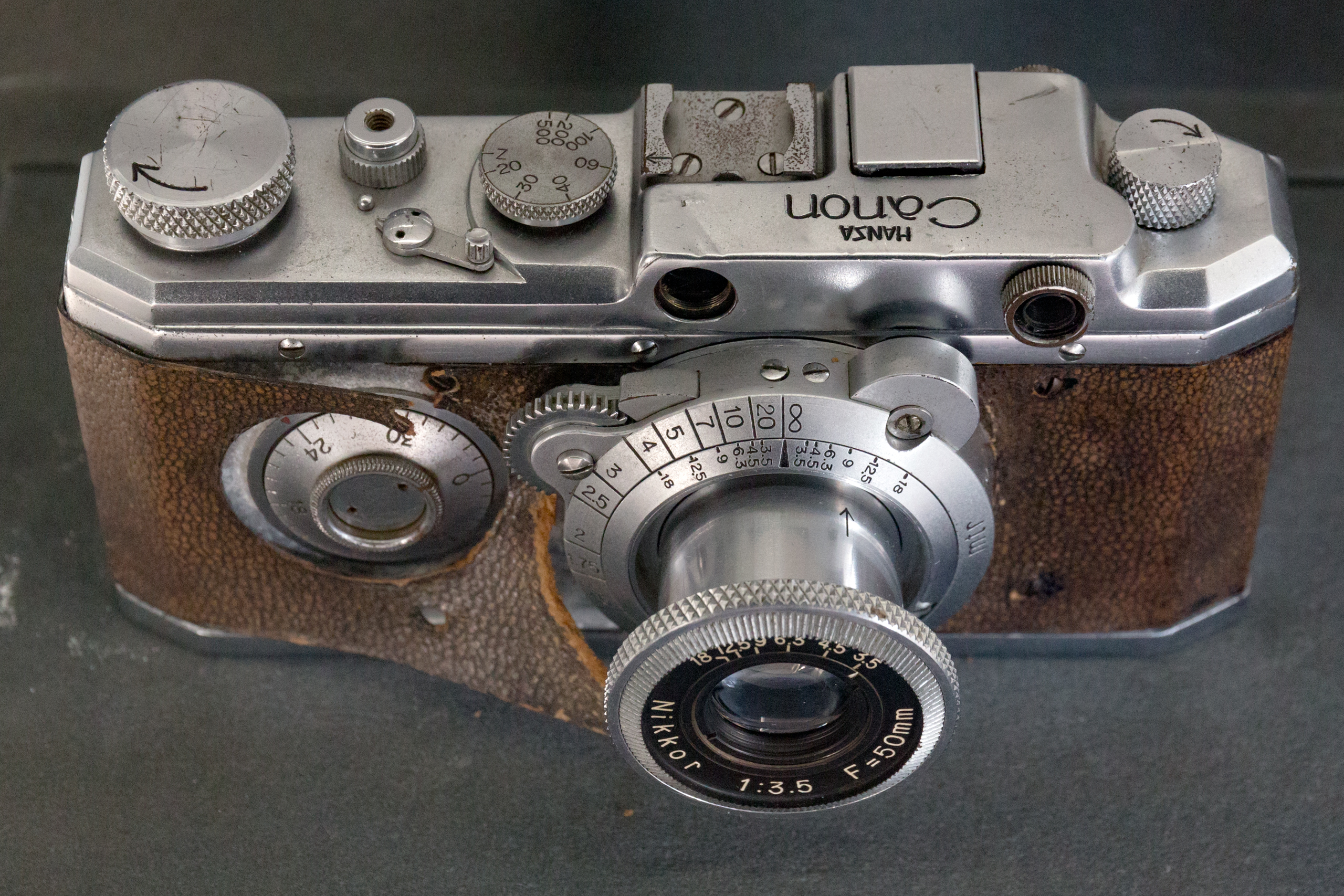
Hansa Canon with the Nikkor 50mm f/3.5 lens

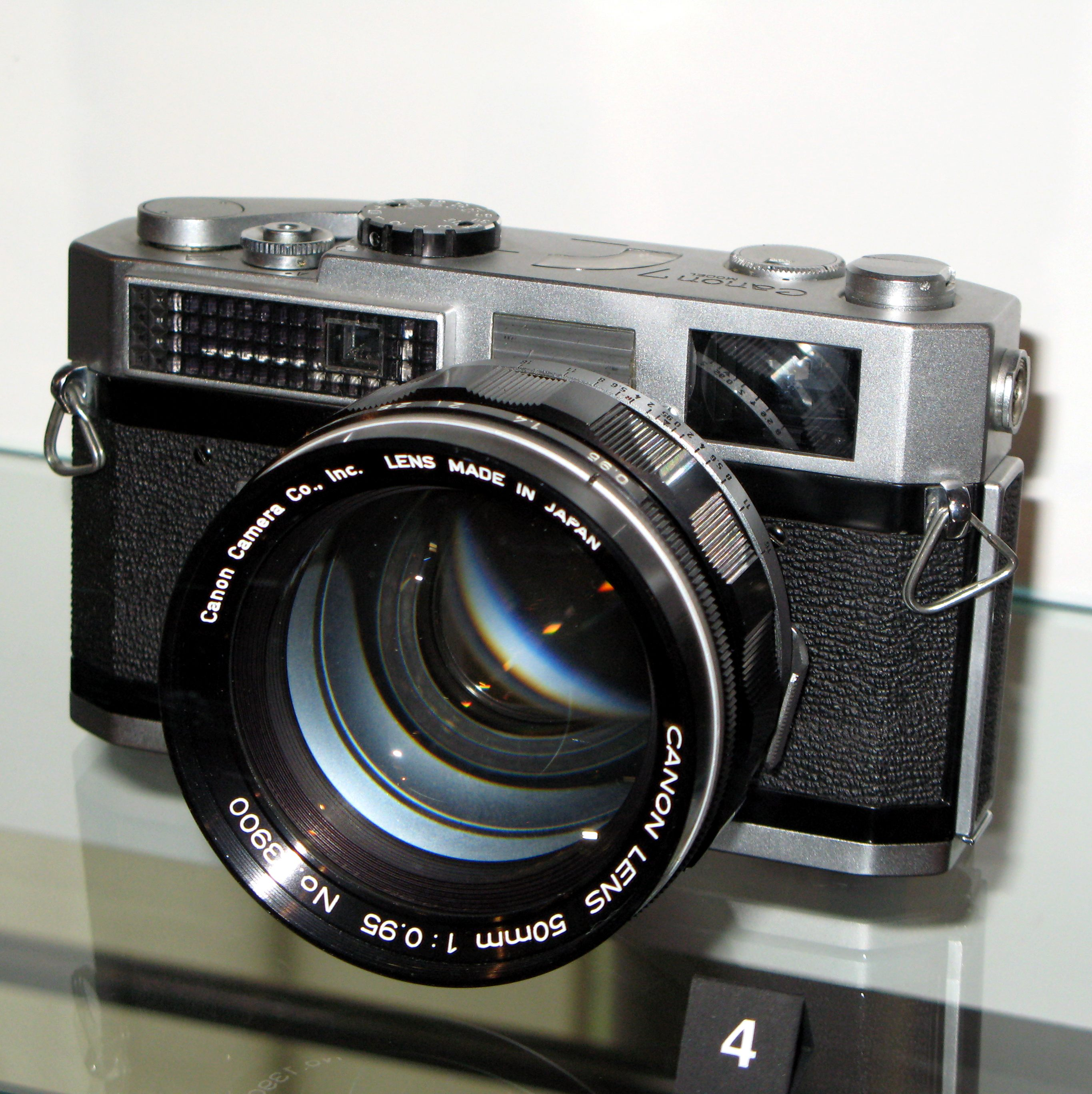
Canon 7 with the Canon 50mm f/0.95 lens

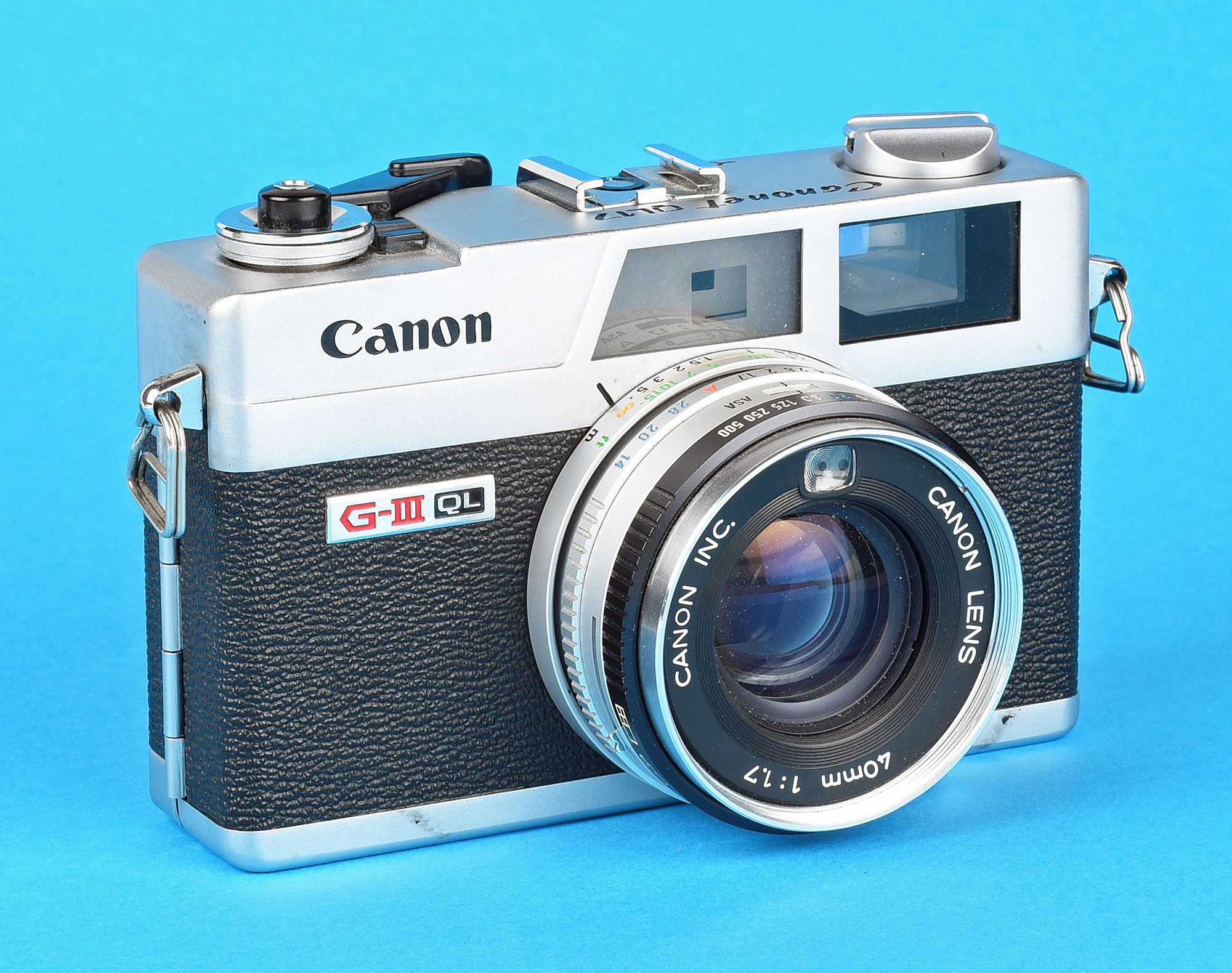
Canon Canonet QL G-III 17

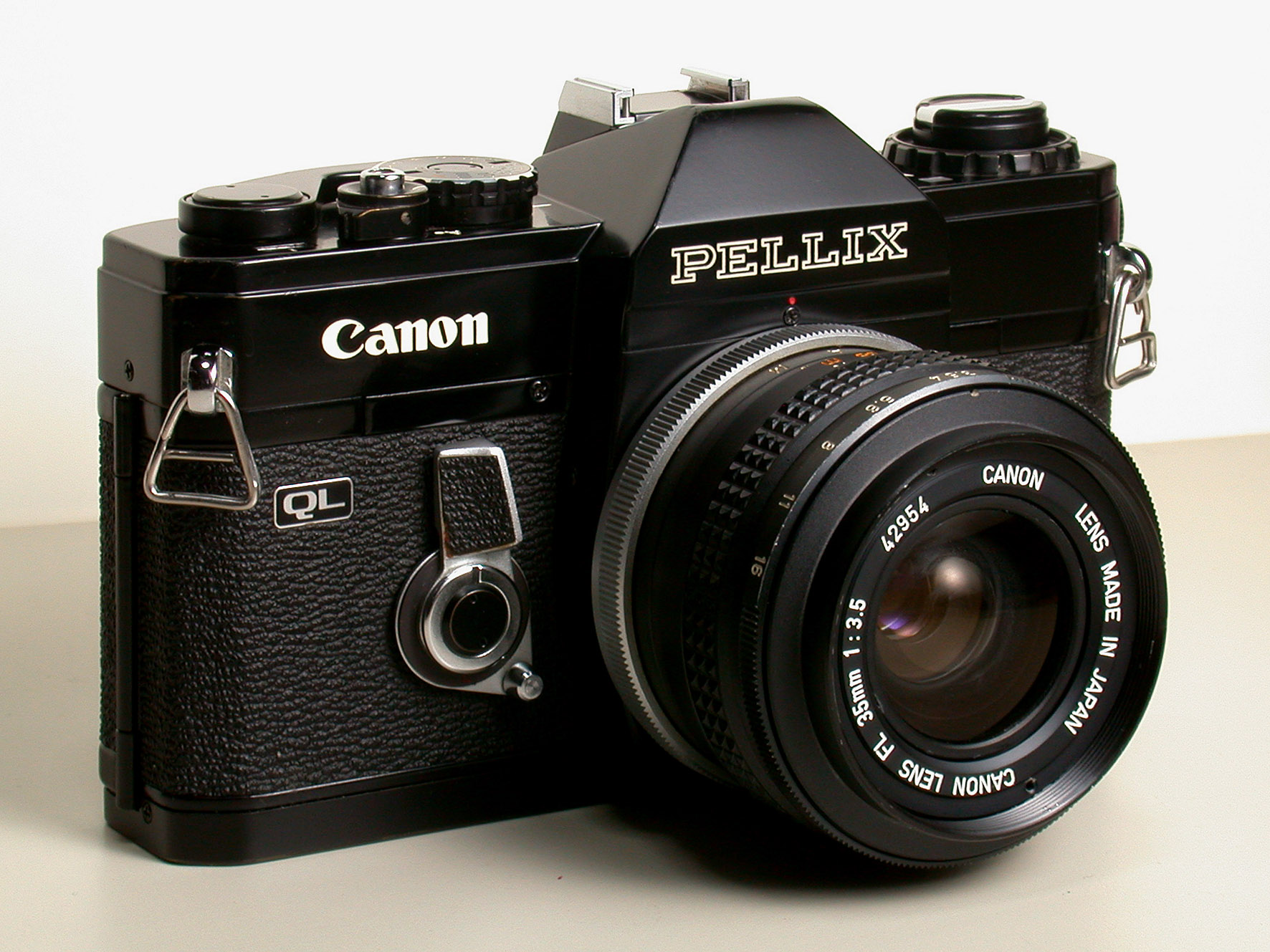
Canon Pellix

=== 1970–2009 ===
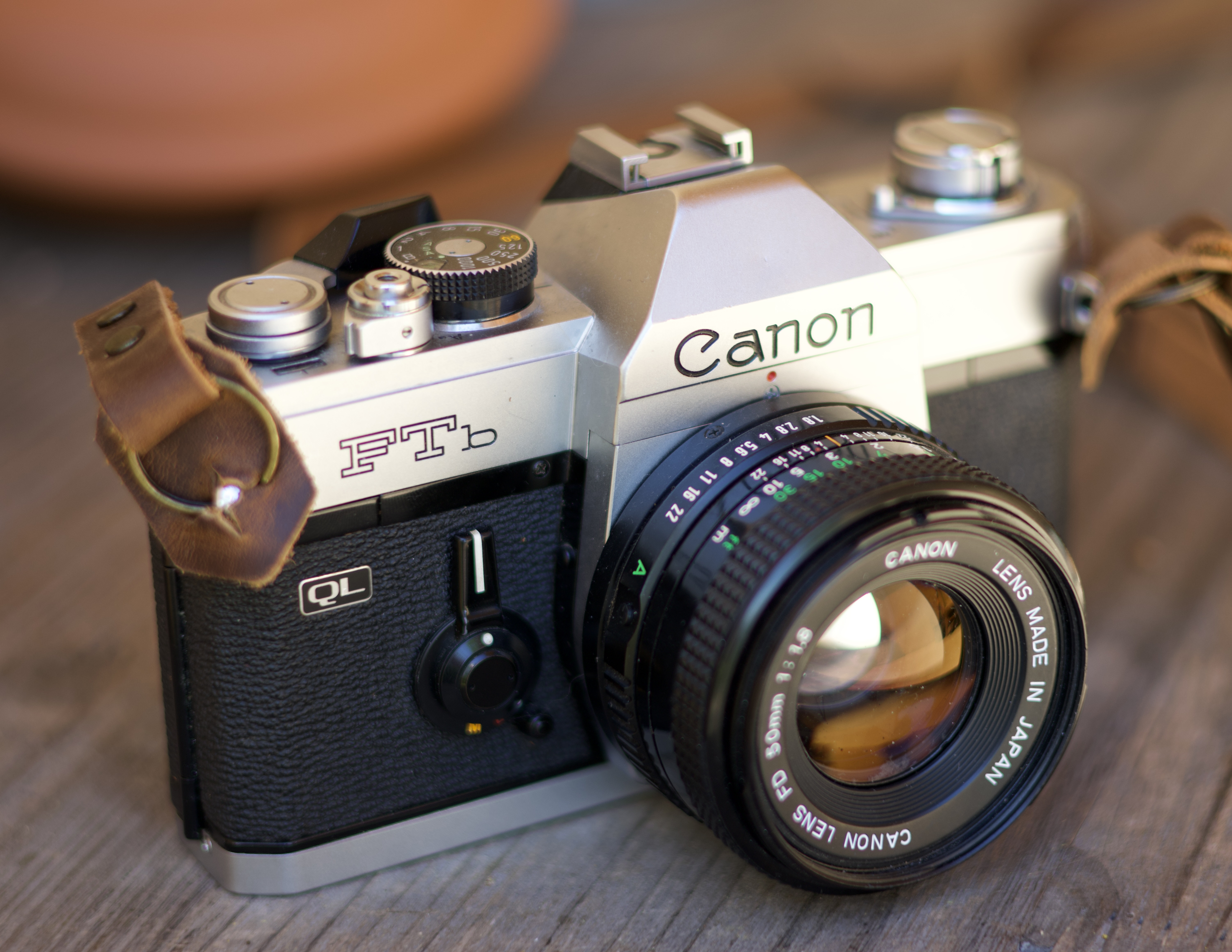
Canon FTb, introduced in 1971

In 1971, Canon introduced the Canon F-1, a high-end SLR camera, and the FD lens range. In 1976, Canon launched the Canon AE-1, the world's first camera with an embedded micro-computer.

Canon introduced its Inkjet printer using bubble-jet technology in 1985, one year after Hewlett-Packard. In 1987, Canon introduced its Canon Electro-Optical System (EOS), named after the goddess of the dawn, along with the Canon EOS 650 autofocus SLR camera. Also in 1987, the Canon Foundation was established. In 1988, Canon introduced 'Kyosei philosophy'. The EOS 1 Flagship Professional SLR line was launched in 1989. In the same year the EOS RT, the world's first AF SLR with a fixed, semi-transparent pellicle mirror, was unveiled.

In 1992, Canon launched the Canon EOS 5, the first-ever camera with eye-controlled AF, and the PowerShot 600, its first digital camera. In 1995, Canon introduced the first commercially available SLR lens with internal image stabilization, Canon EF 75-300mm lens f/4–5.6 IS USM. The Canon EOS-RS was the world's fastest AF SLR camera with a continuous shooting speed of 10 frame/s at the time. Based on the EOS-1N, the EOS-1N RS had a fixed, semi-transparent pellicle mirror with a hard coat. In 1996, Canon introduced a pocket-sized digital camera with the Advanced Photo System, named ELPH in America and IXUS in Europe. Canon entered the digital video camcorder market in 1997.

In 2004, Canon introduced the XEED SX50 LCD projector. Canon introduced its first high-definition camcorder in 2005.

In November 2009, Canon made a €730 million (US$1.1 billion) all-cash offer for the Dutch printer maker Océ. Canon had acquired majority ownership of Océ by March 2010, and completed the acquisition of 100% of shares in Océ by the end of 2011.

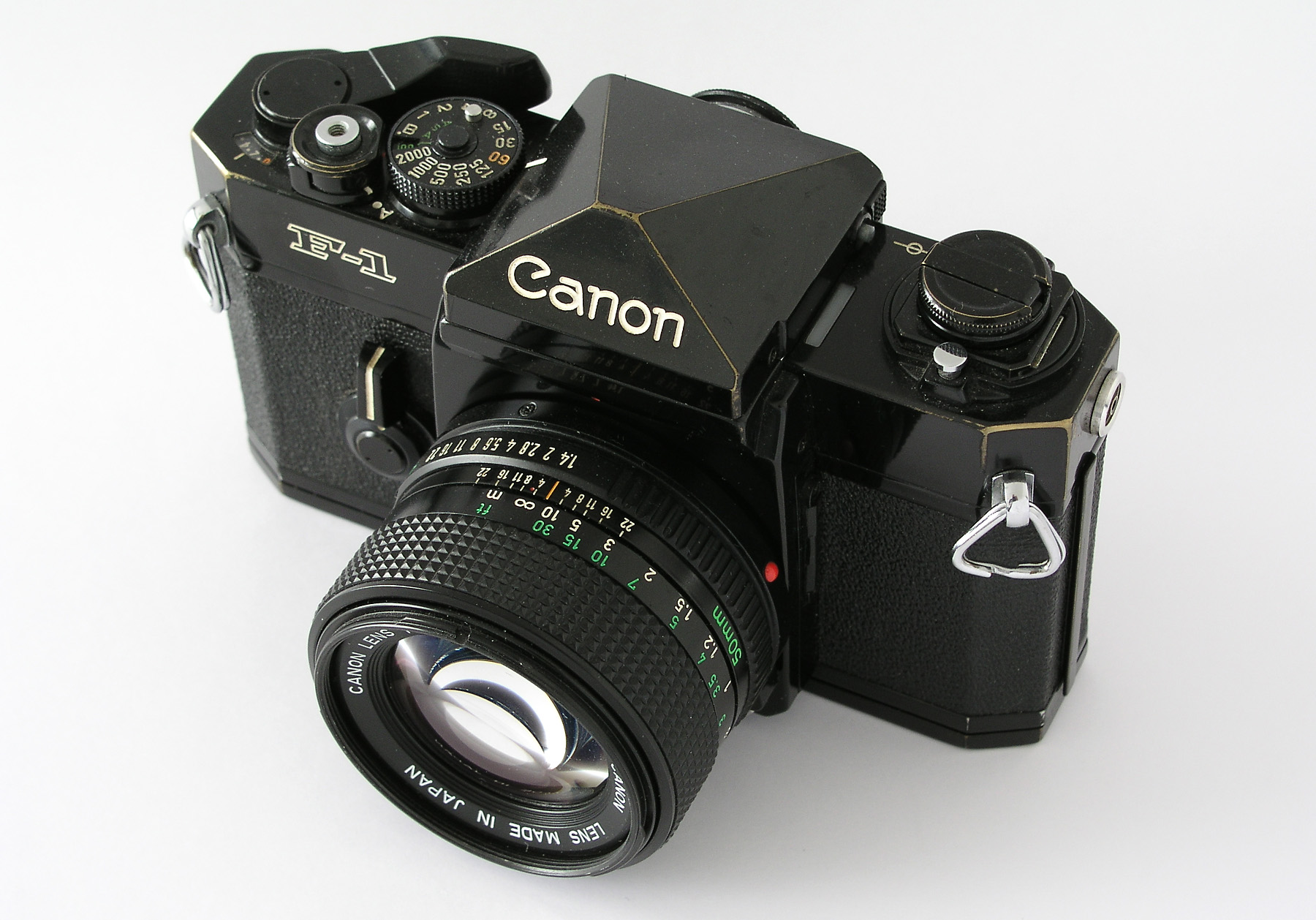
A Canon F1

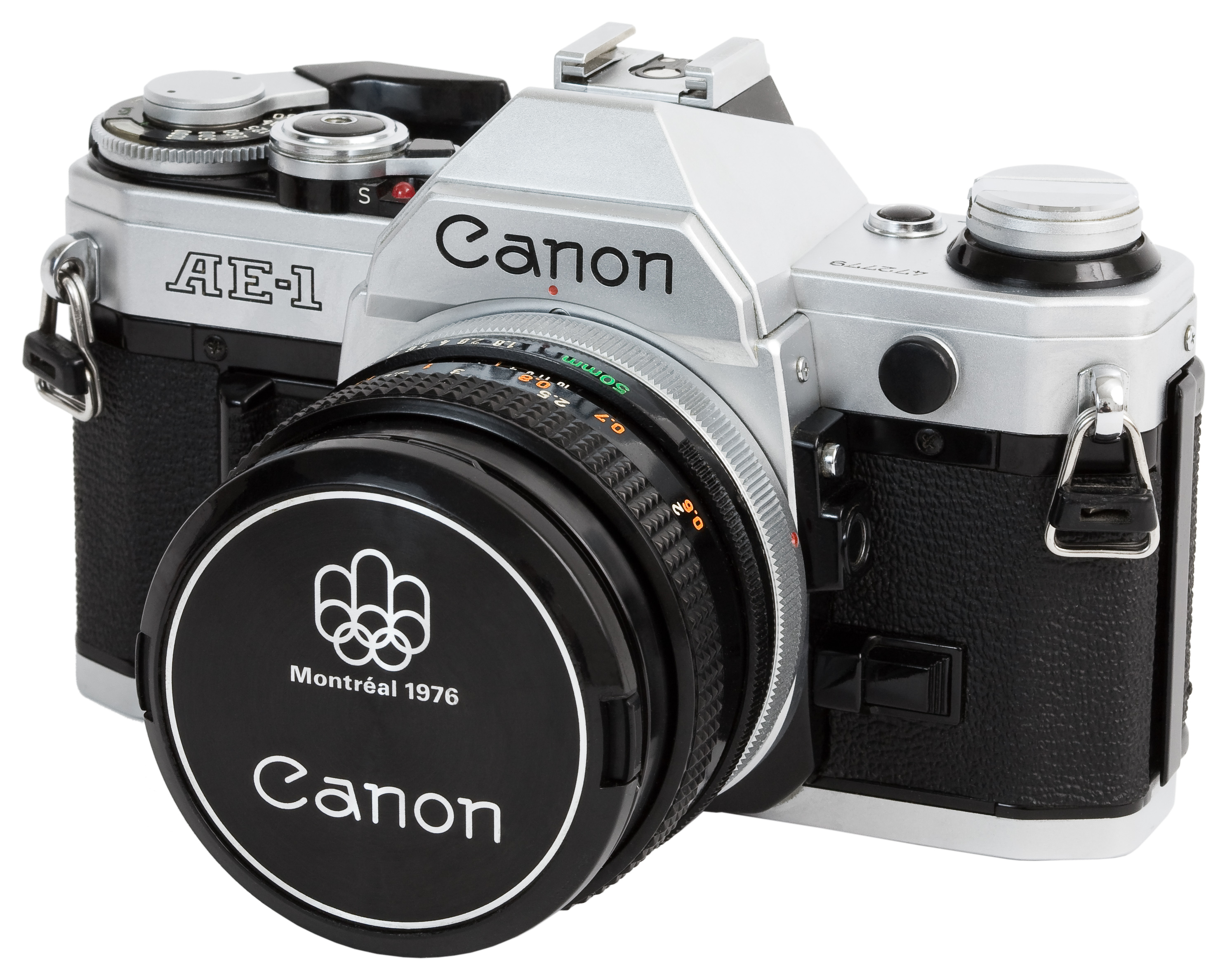
A Canon AE-1

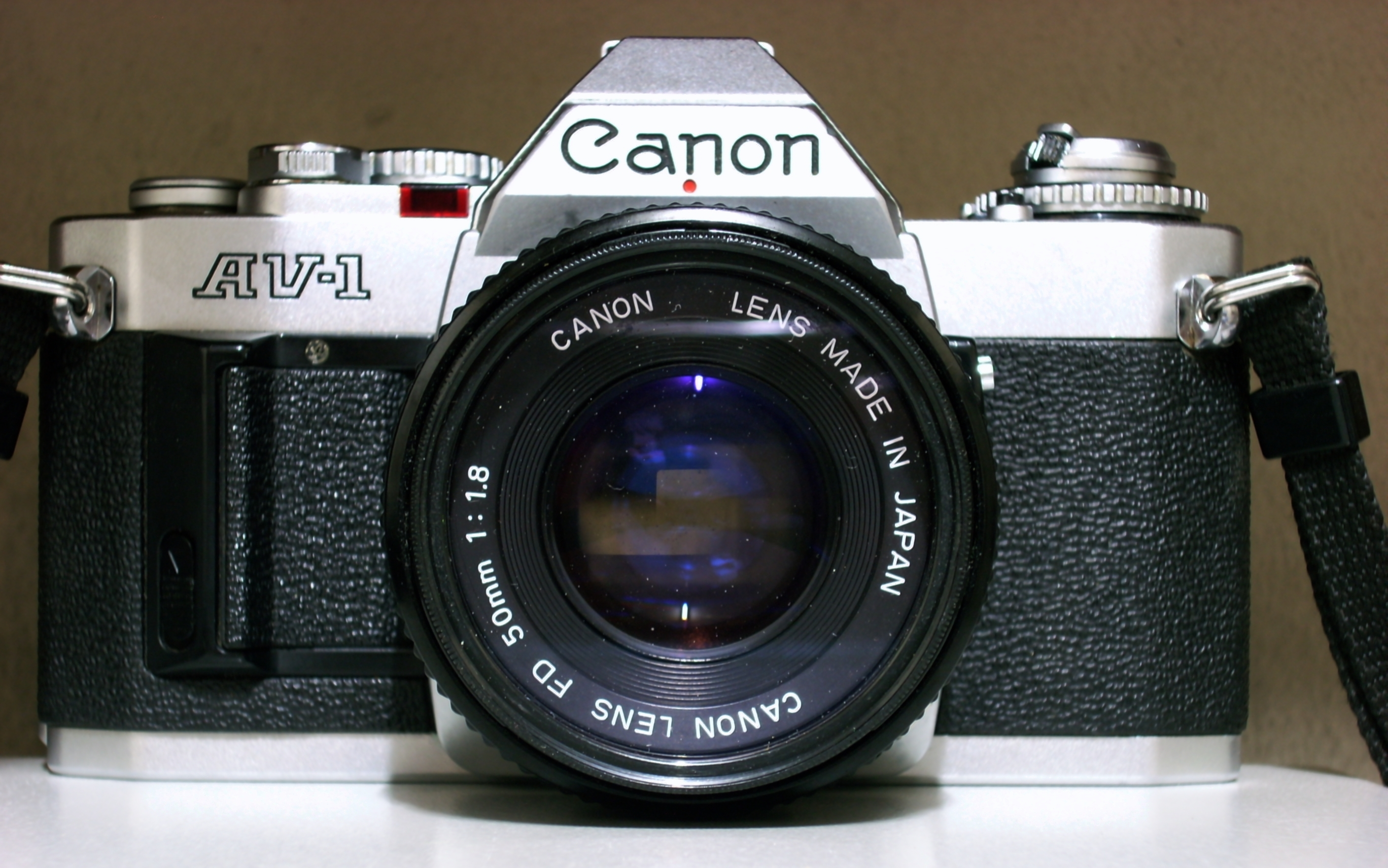
A Canon AV-1

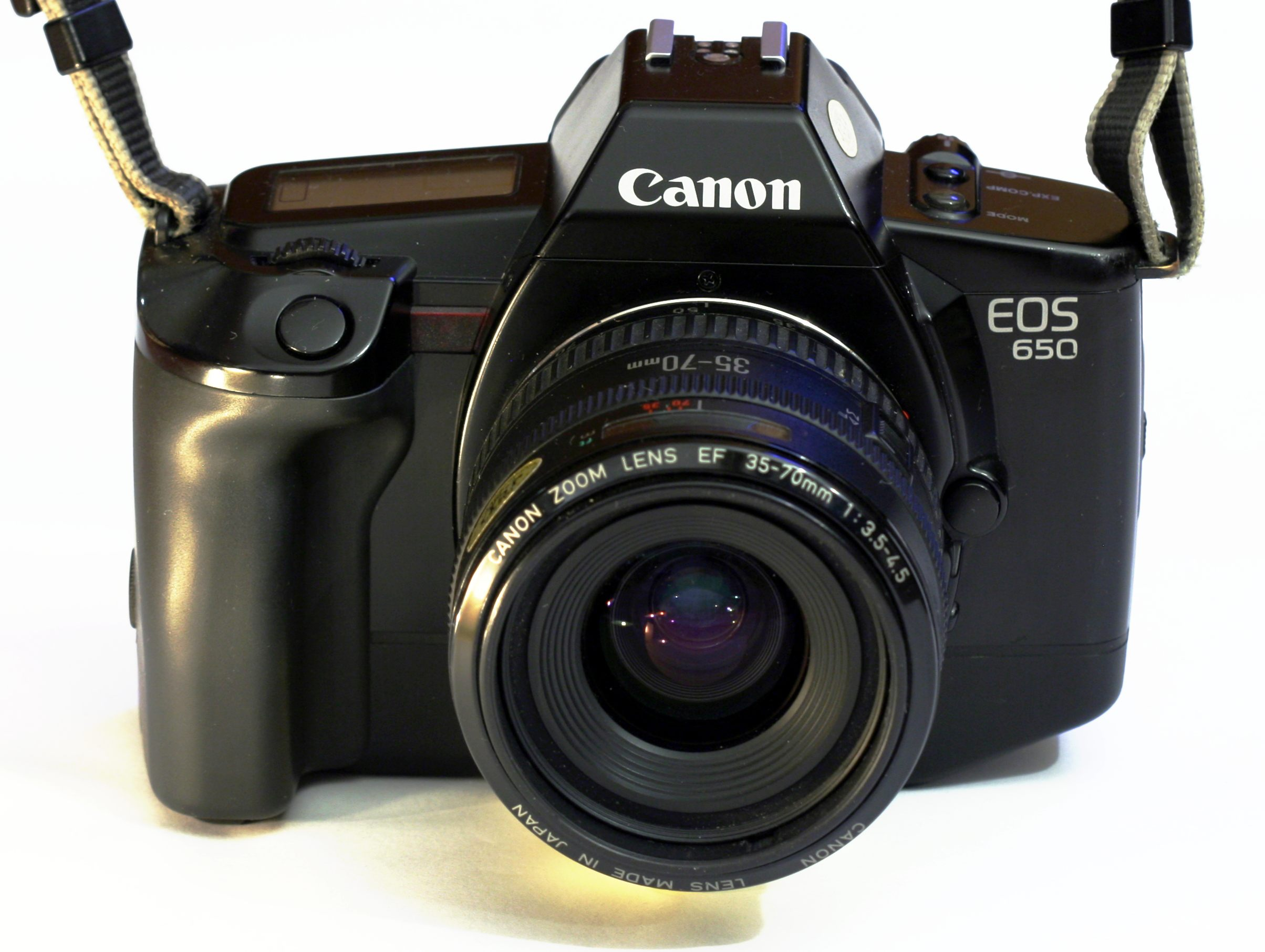
A Canon EOS 650

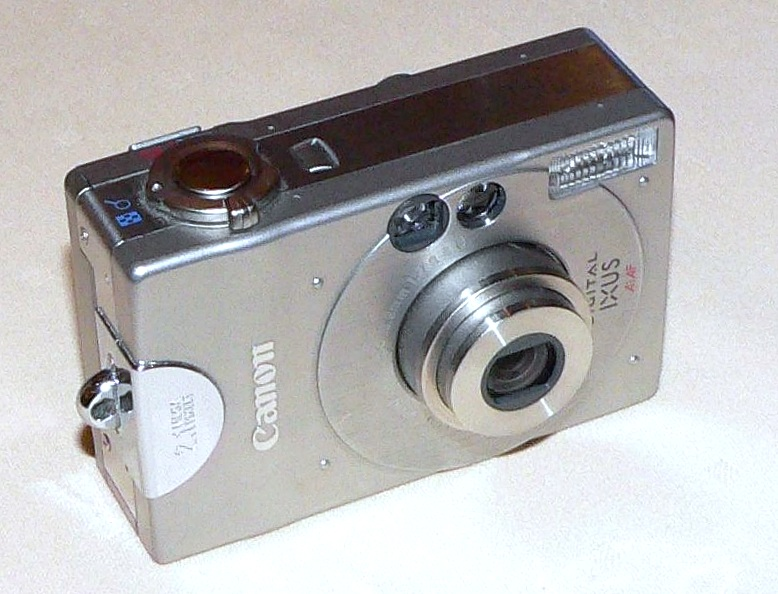
An original Canon Digital IXUS

=== 2010–2019 ===
In 2010, Canon acquired Tereck Office Solutions, Inc. On 16 March 2010, Canon announced that it was seeking to acquire a new .canon generic top-level domain, acquiring it in February 2015 and using it for the first time on its global website in May 2016.

In the third quarter of 2012, Canon's global market share for printers, copiers and multifunction devices was 20.90%. In early 2013, Canon USA moved into a new US$500 million headquarters in Melville, New York.

In February 2014, Canon announced it would acquire Texas-based Molecular Imprints Inc., a developer of nanoprint lithography systems, for an amount speculated to be around US$98 million. On 13 June 2014, Canon announced it had acquired Danish IP Surveillance VMS software company Milestone Systems. Milestone provides open-platform software to allow video management from various vendors in a single interface; therefore the company will operate as a separate entity.

On 10 February 2015, Canon announced that it had intentions to buy Swedish Security Camera maker Axis Communications for US$2.83 billion. On 23 February 2015, Axis Communications reacted to this news and confirmed that it had received a purchase proposal from Canon. The purchase was effectively completed in April 2015. On 24 April 2015, Canon Europe announced it had acquired the London-based family photo sharing startup Lifecake. In November 2015, in an effort to avoid the selling of gray-market camera gear, Canon USA filed litigation against a number of camera gear retailers. Retailers include Get It Digital, All New Shop and F&E Trading.

In March 2016, Canon acquired Toshiba Medical Systems Corporation for US$5.9 billion. On 28 March 2017, Canon Europe announced it had acquired the London-based printing startup Kite. On 2 April 2019, Canon introduces two new UHDgc 2/3-inch Portable Zoom Lenses designed For 4K UHD Broadcast Cameras.

=== Since 2020 ===
In July 2020, Canon recorded its first ever quarterly loss due to the COVID-19 pandemic. In September 2020, Fujitsu announced that it would provide Canon with a Fujitsu Supercomputer PRIMEHPC FX1000 unit, to assist with its no-prototype development manufacturing initiative. In December 2020, Canon concluded its photographic-equipment print-ad series named "Wildlife as Canon Sees It". This series of ads began in 1981 in National Geographic magazine.

In October 2023, Canon introduced its new nanoimprint lithography manufacturing systems, which it claims are simpler and more affordable than ASML's extreme ultraviolet lithography systems. The system prints the desired circuit pattern onto the silicon wafer bypassing photolithography and can produce circuits equivalent to 5 nm scale.

== Products ==
Canon's products include cameras (including compact digital camera, video camera, film SLR and digital SLR), camcorders, lenses, broadcasting equipment and solutions (such as free viewpoint solution), professional displays, projectors, manufacturing equipment (including photolithography equipment such as steppers, scanners), printers, photocopiers, image scanners, digital microfilm scanners, fax machines, binoculars, microscopes, medical equipment (including diagnostic systems such as ultrasound, X-ray, CT and MRI scanners and ophthalmic equipment), CCTV solutions, image sensors, calculators, high precision positioning and measurement devices (such as rotary encoders), custom optical components, handy terminals, mixed reality systems, software, and space satellites.

=== Digital cameras ===
Canon has been manufacturing and distributing digital cameras since 1984, starting with the RC-701. The RC series was followed by the PowerShot and Digital IXUS series of digital cameras. Canon also developed the EOS series of digital single-lens reflex cameras (DSLR) which includes high-end professional models.

Due to consumers switching from compact cameras to smartphones, Canon's Q1 2013 operating profit fell 34 percent year-on-year.

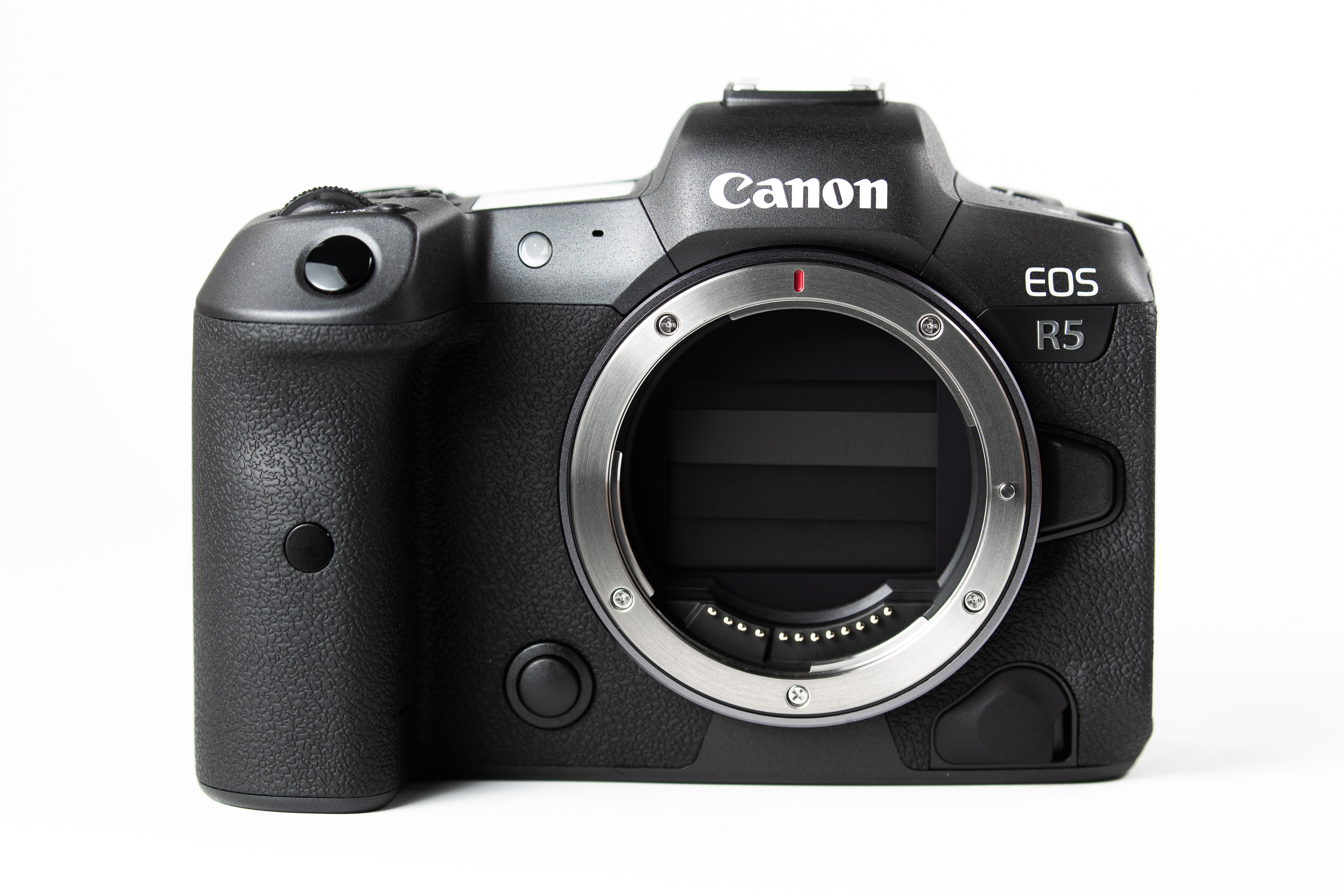
Canon EOS R5

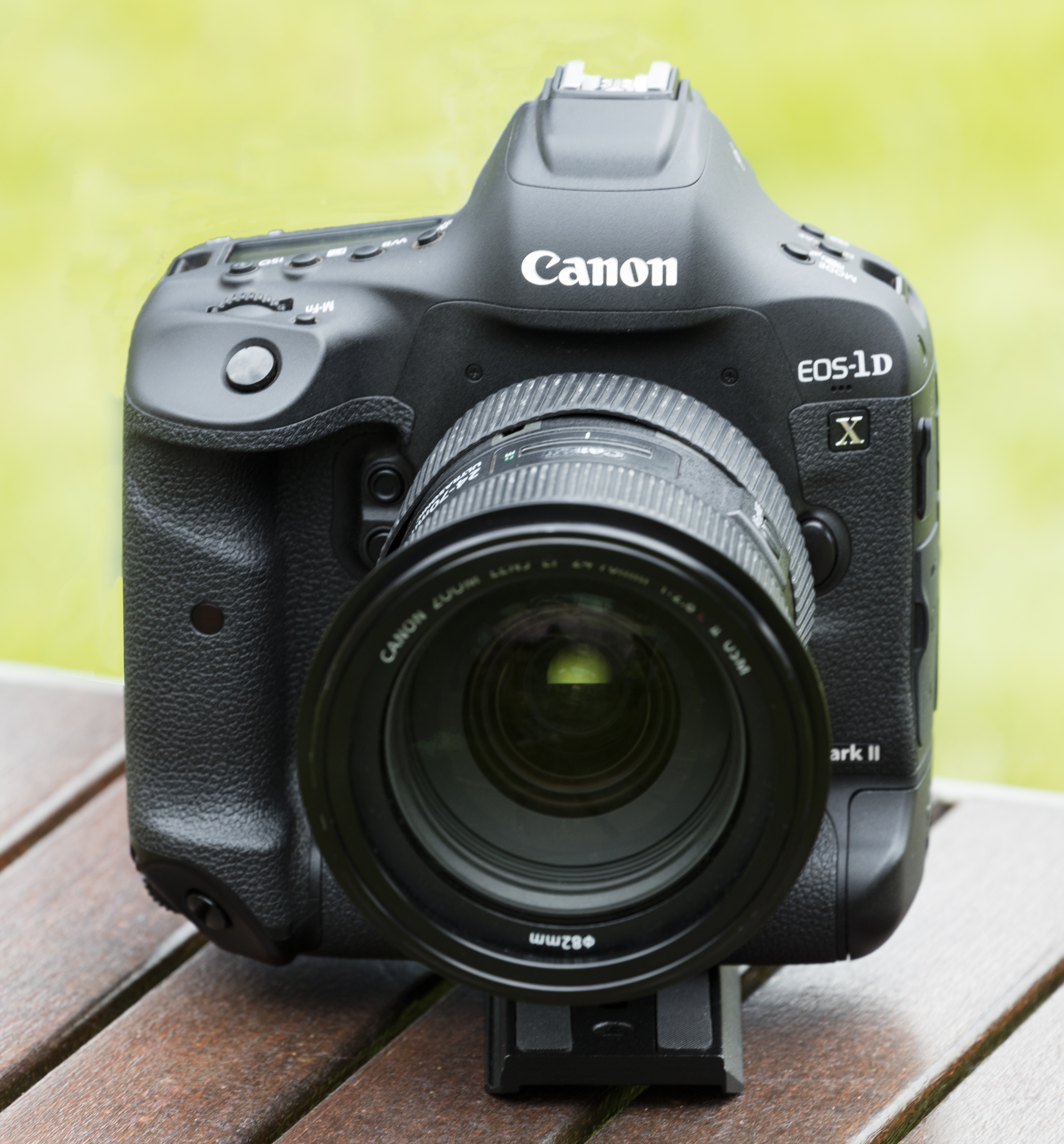
Canon EOS-1D X Mark II

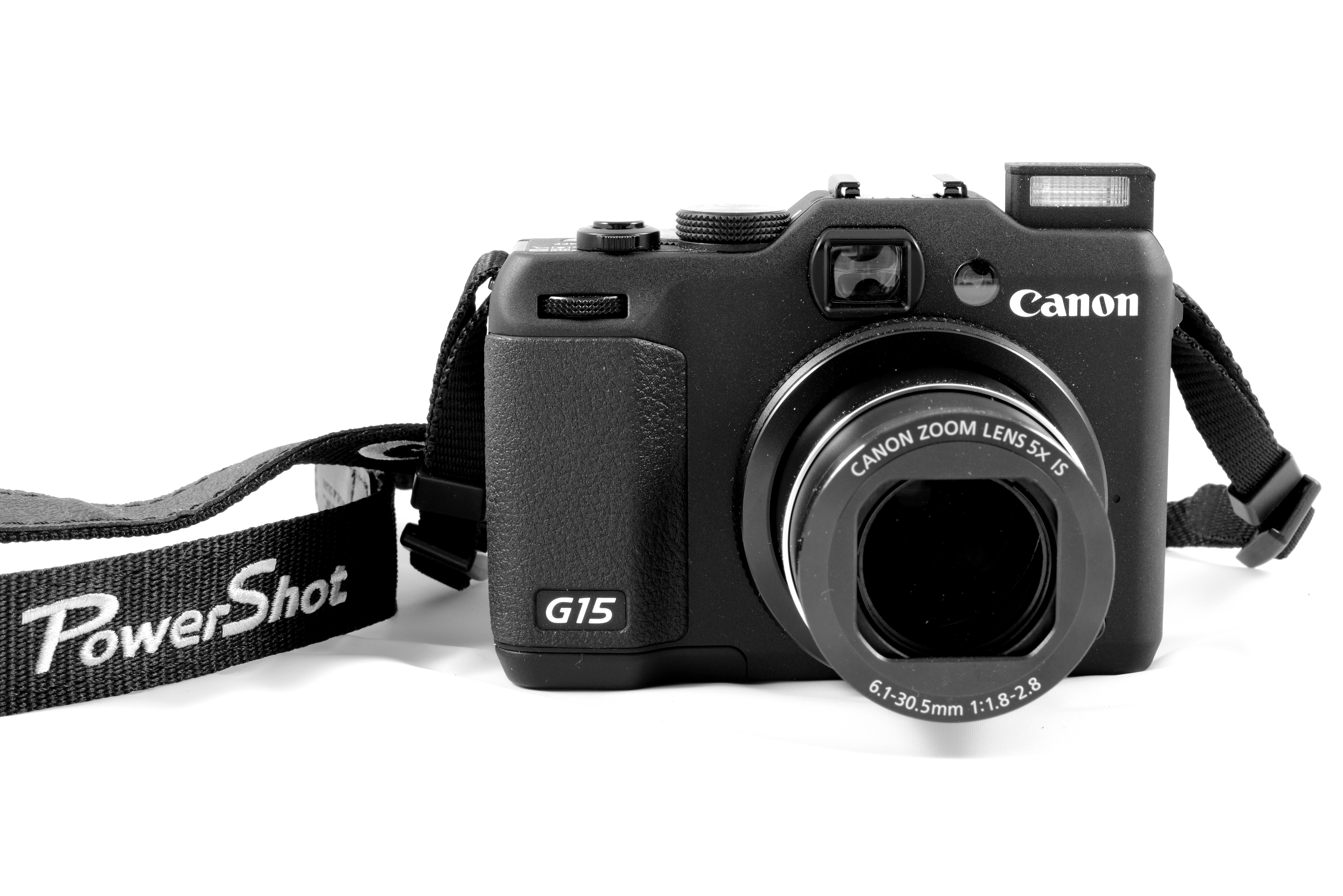
Canon PowerShot G15

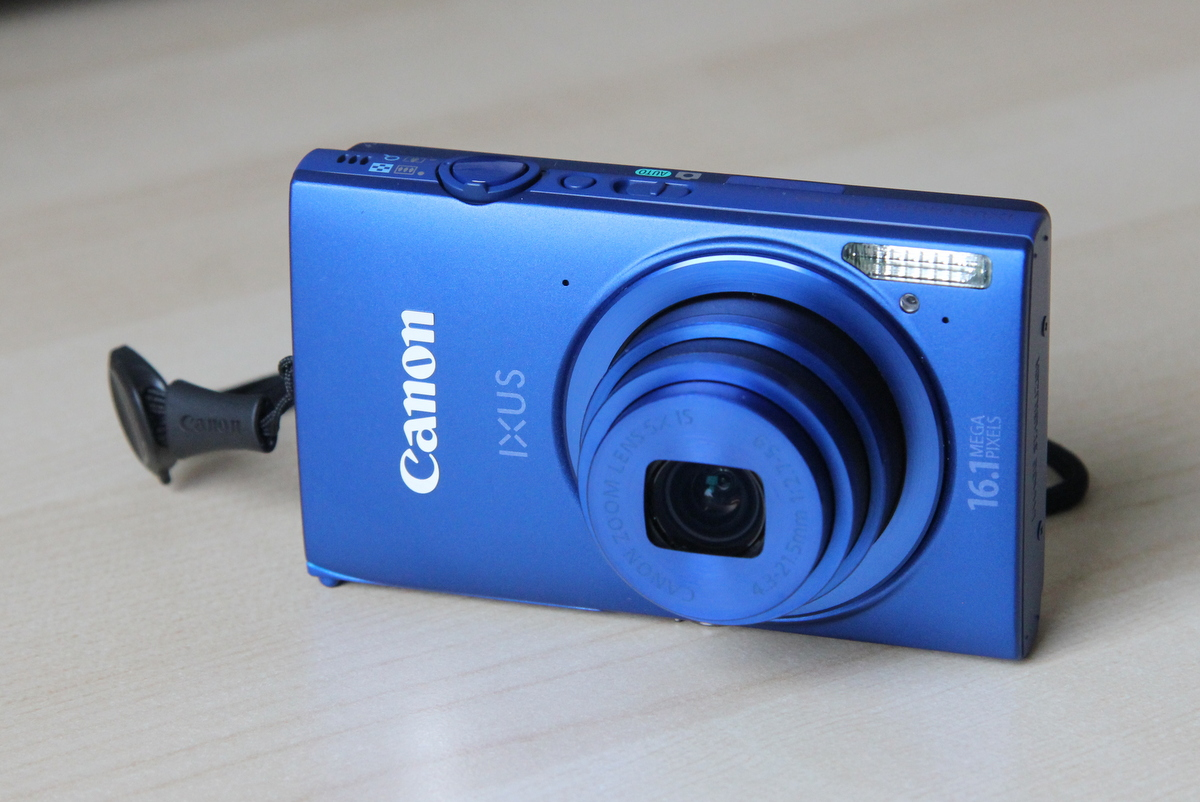
Canon Ixus 240 HS

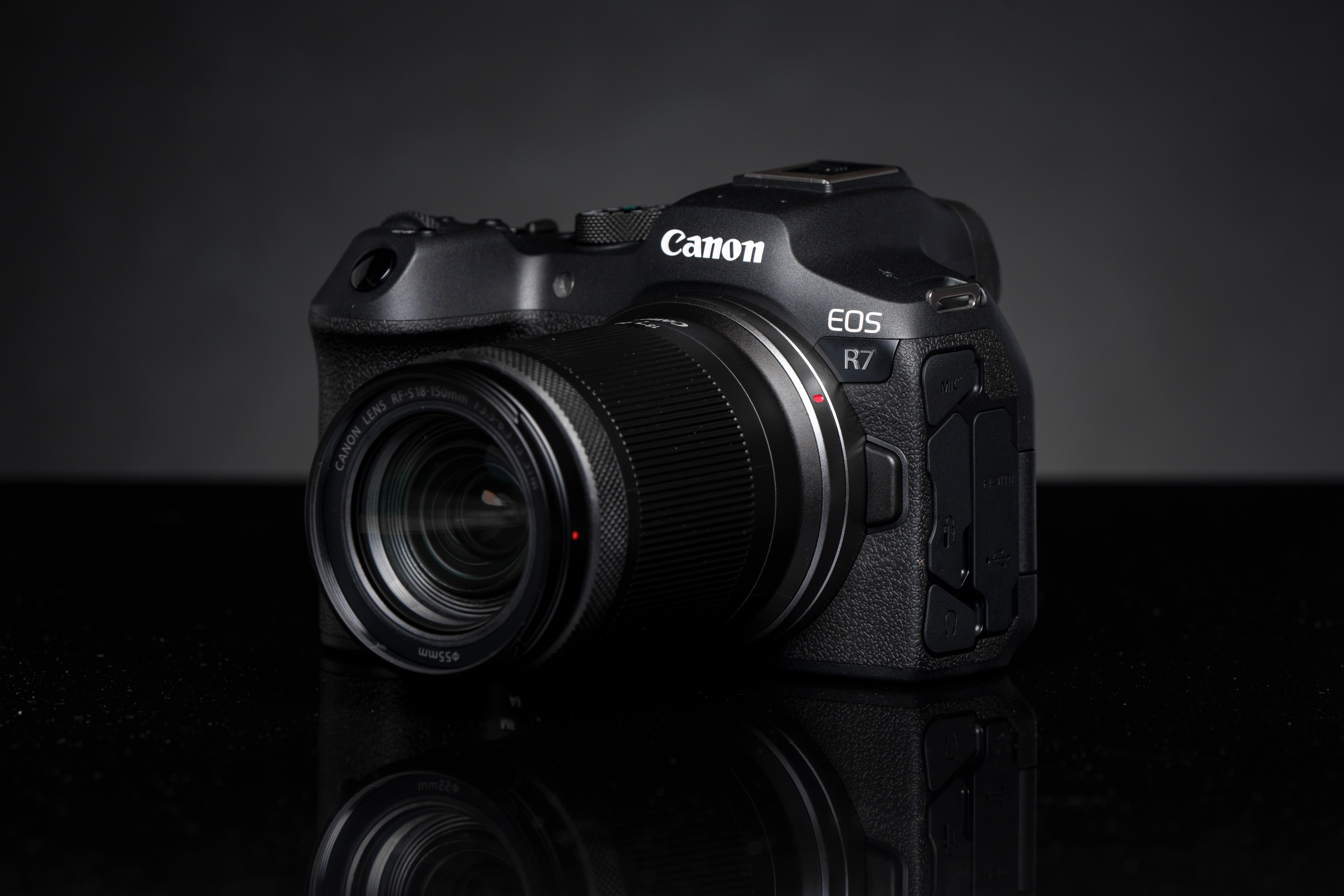
Canon EOS R7

=== Flash units ===
Canon produces a range of high-output flash units for its DSLR cameras, including the 270EX II, 320EX, 430EX II, 430EX III-RT, 470EX-AI, 580EX, 580EX II, 600EX-RT, 600EXII-RT, EL-1, and EL-5 Speedlites. Canon also produces macro flash units, including the Macro Twin Lite and the Macro Ring Lite.

=== CMOS image sensor ===
Canon designs and manufactures CMOS image sensors in-house for its imaging products and it has three dedicated fabs in Japan. In 2016, Canon, the fifth-largest image sensor manufacturer in the world, decided to start selling the sensors to other companies. However, it does not plan to sell smartphone image sensors to focus on the niche markets such as industrial and space observation.

Although Canon had withdrawn from the so-called 'pixel count race' in the 2000s, it has been on the cutting edge as to the image sensor resolution in recent years. A demo of a 250MP image sensor was revealed in 2015 and reported to be launched in 2020. In 2018, Canon launched a 120MP image sensor as a part of its latest B2B offerings.

=== Printers ===
For many years, Canon was the principal maker of the print engines found in industry-standard laser printers. The first models of Apple LaserWriter and the equivalent products made by HP used the Canon LBP-CX engine. The next models (LaserWriter II series, LaserJet II series) used the Canon LBP-SX engine. Later models used the Canon LBP-LX, LBP-EX, LBP-PX engines and many other Canon print engines.

Following Canon's acquisition of the Dutch digital printing manufacturer Océ in 2010, Canon continued to develop and manufacture printing systems, initially under the Océ brand name. On 1 January 2020 the company Océ was officially renamed Canon Production Printing.

Canon has been sued over intentionally designing all-in-one printers that cannot scan when the printer is low on ink. Canon settled the lawsuit in 2023 without admitting guilt.

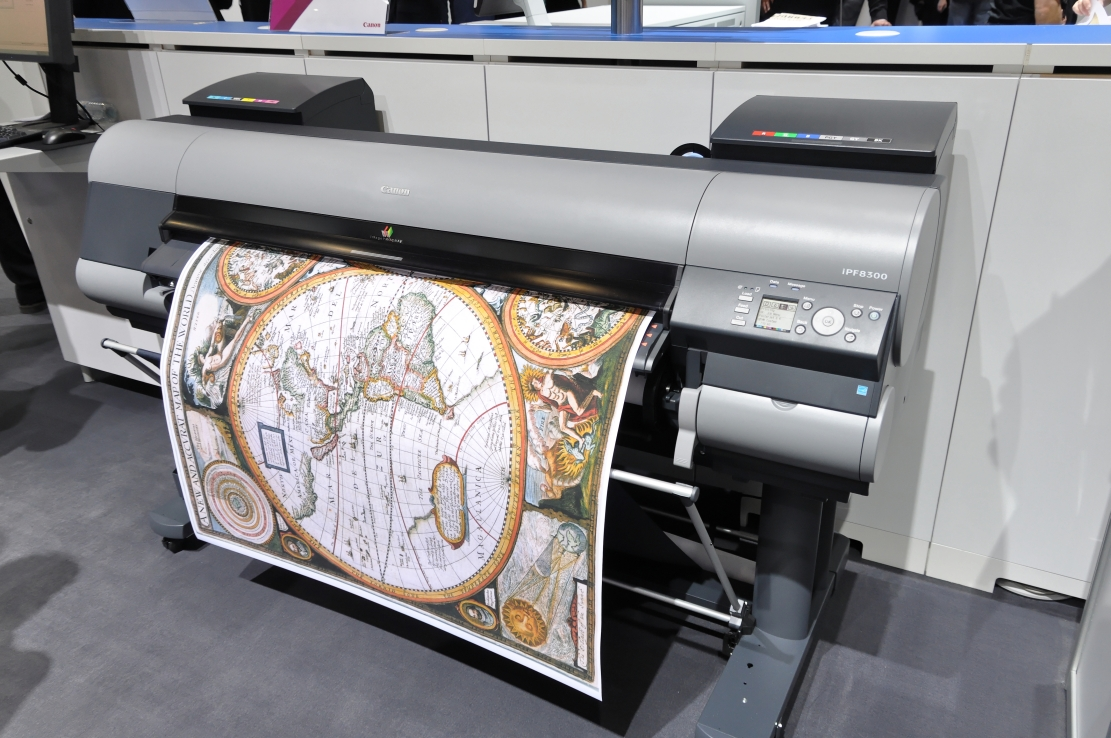
A Canon wide-format printer

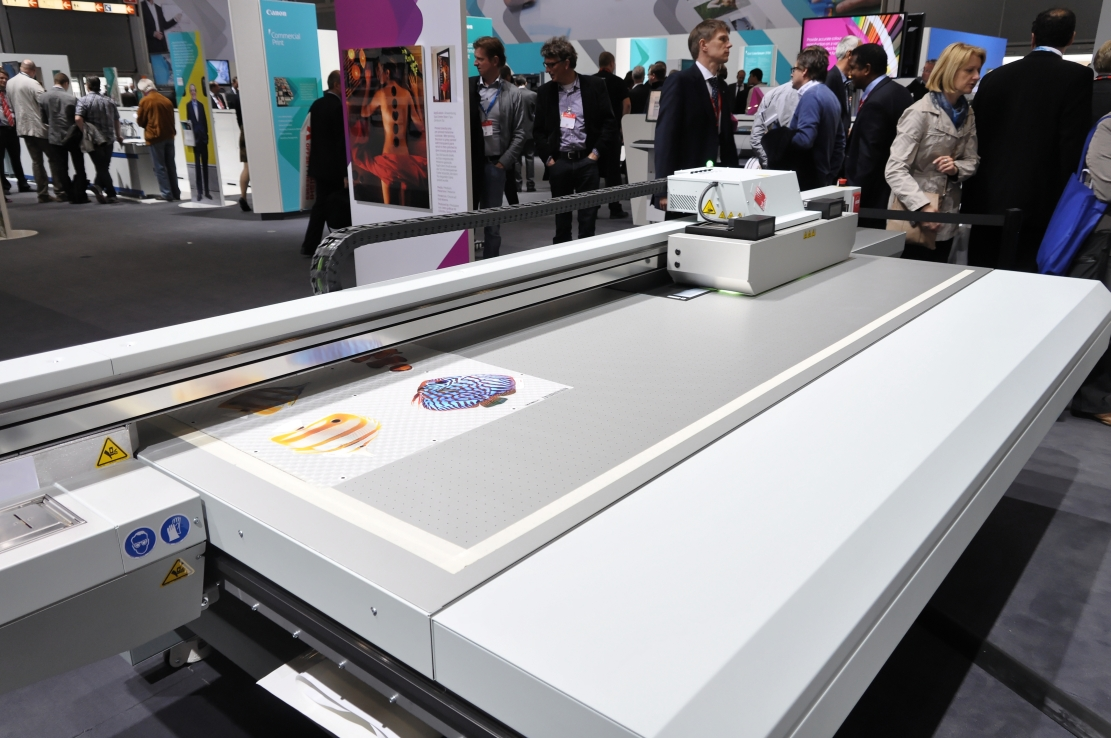
A Canon large-format printer

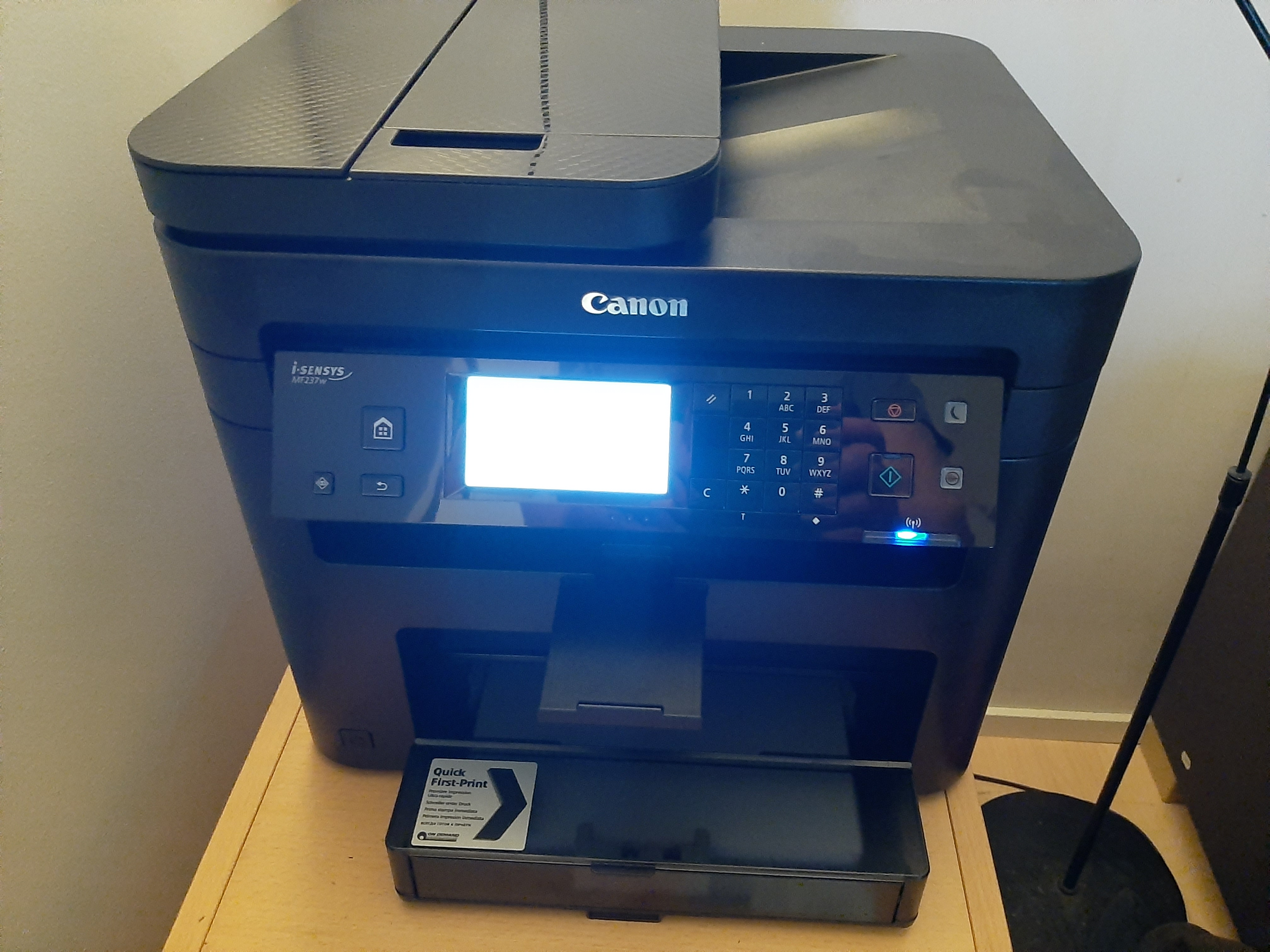
Canon i-Sensys MF237w

=== Digital copiers ===
Canon's largest division in terms of revenue is its multifunction copier division. Canon distributes its consumer and home office imageCLASS line though retail outlets and professional-grade imageRUNNER series through subsidiary Canon Solutions America and independent distributors. The professional-grade series ranges from small table tops to large digital presses.

=== Scanners ===
Canon manufactures a wide range of flatbed scanners, film scanners and document scanners for home and business use, including the Canon CanoScan 8800F. Some of its scanners employ LED inDirect Exposure (LiDE) technology, such that USB port is sufficient to power the scanner, and no additional power is required.

Current printers use the proprietary BJNP protocol (USB over IP port 8611).

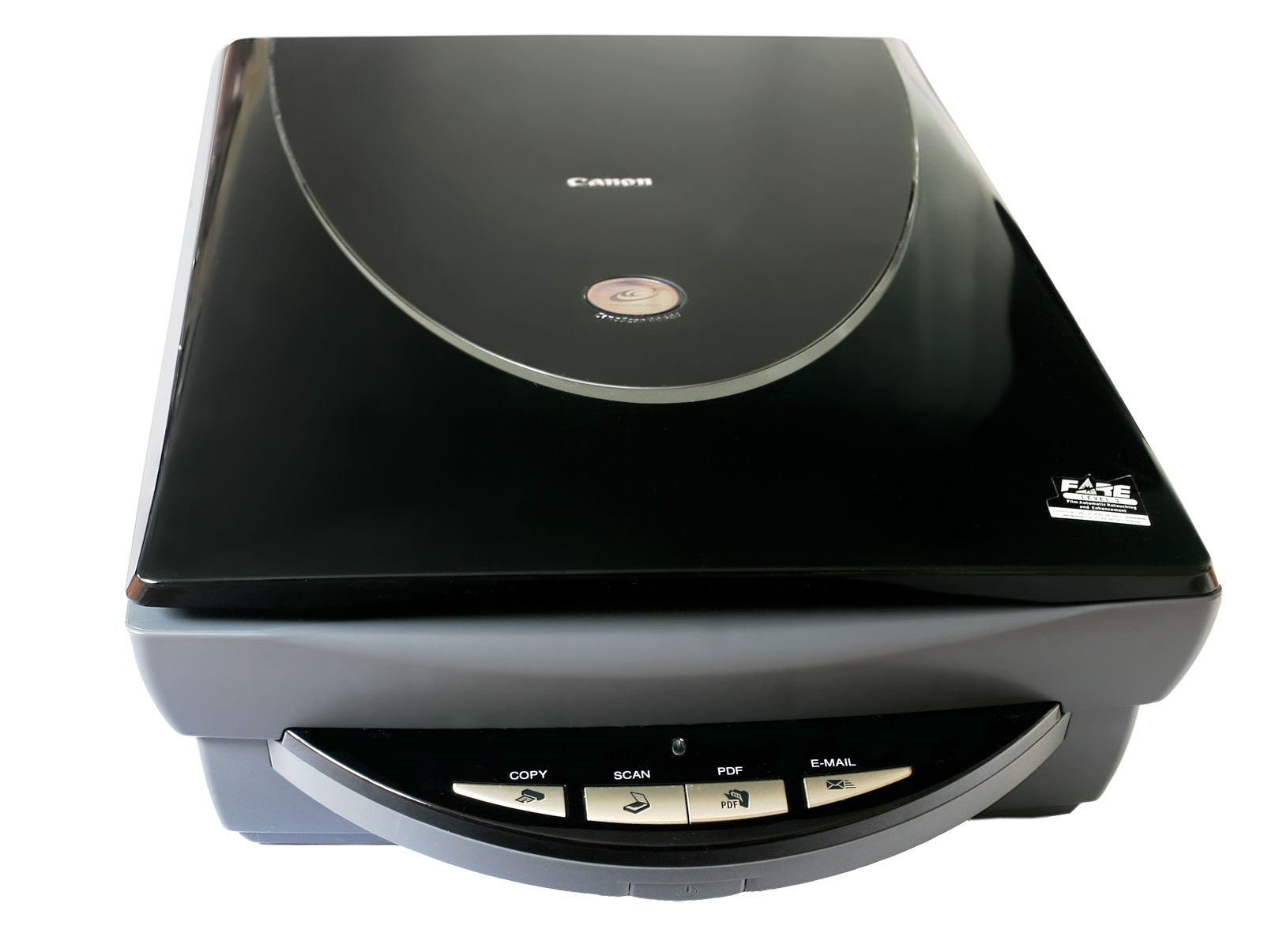
A Canon CanoScan 9950F scanner

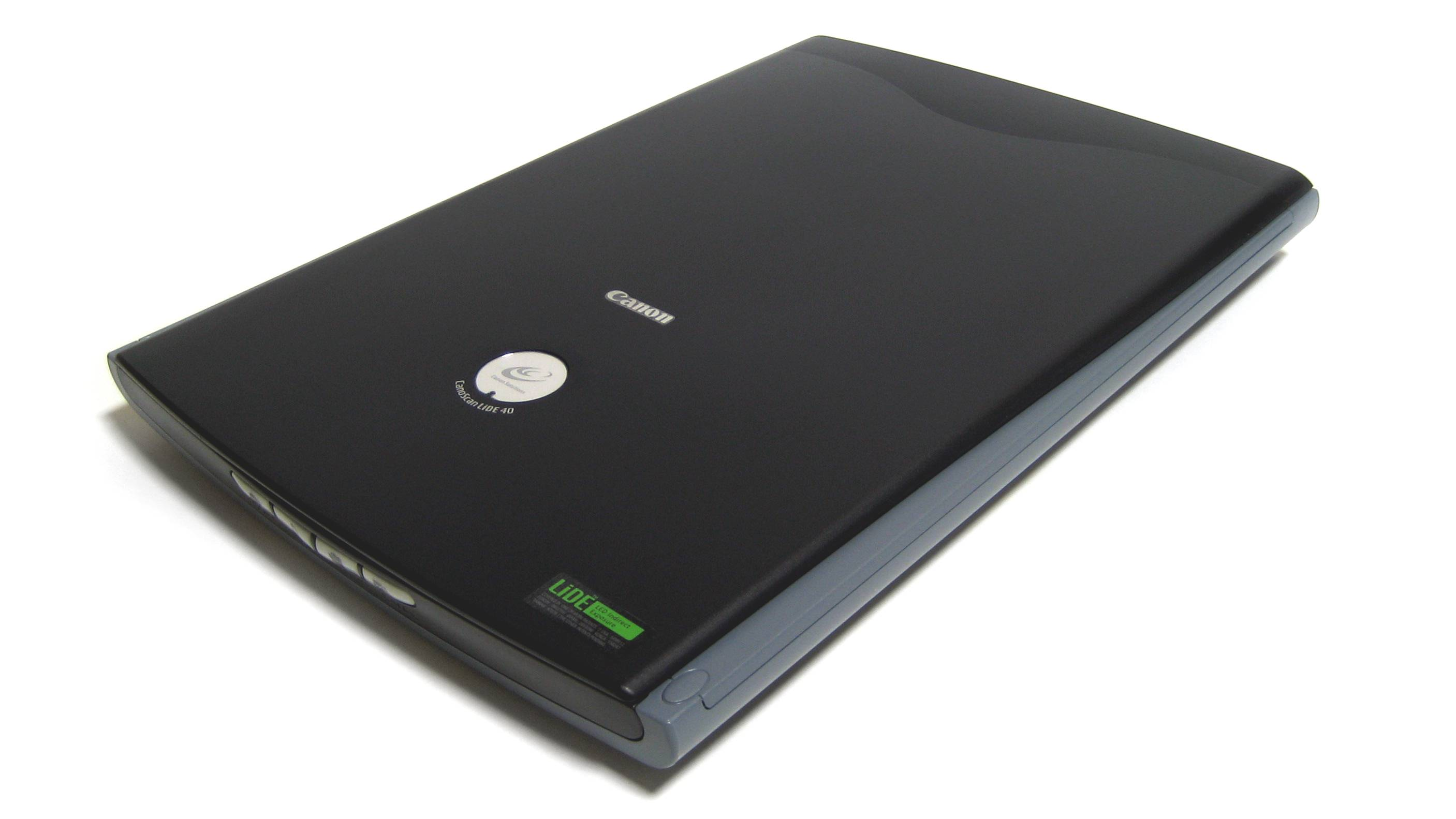
A Canon CanoScan LiDE40

=== Calculators ===
Canon produced a range of calculators in various applications, including handheld calculators, desktop calculators, printing calculators and scientific calculators. One model was the 1964 Canola 130. It had 13 digits, a result of marketing research. The reason for the odd number of figures was based on selling it to the Japanese central bank. Given the low value of the Japanese Yen, 13 digits was a requirement of the banks.

The calculator was built by germanium transistors and the display was a light pipe which gave an odd format.

=== Projectors ===
Canon produces a range of projectors.

=== Presenters ===
Canon offers a range of wireless presenters, from advanced green laser presenters with back-lit screen display to basic red laser presentation clickers.

=== Virtual reality headset ===
Canon is developing a prototype virtual reality headset (Canon VR). The headset offers a wider viewing angle (120°) than other VR devices but requires handles rather than a head strap. The headset is not yet available on the market. As of 2020, Canon produces and sells high-end AR (augmented reality) headsets for enterprise users.

=== Manufacturing equipment ===
Canon is one of the world's top producers of semiconductor and display manufacturing equipment. Its subsidiary Canon Tokki dominates the market of material deposition equipment, and instruments for manufacturing OLED displays. Canon is also the leading manufacturer of display photolithography equipment and one of the top 3 in the semiconductor lithography machine market. Once a leader of semiconductor lithography along with Nikon, it has been dwarfed by ASML, and as of 2017 its share in the overall market was less than 5%.

== Discontinued products ==
=== Computers ===
Canon introduced two MSX home computer models in 1983, the V-10 and the V-20. Both offered just the minimum range of the MSX standards without any additional features. The V-20 was able to receive shooting data from the T90 Canon camera with the Data Memory Back T90 expansion.

Canon also sold a Canon AS100 PC for which you could get a color or monochrome display computer, shortly after the release of the IBM PC. It was based on the Intel 8088 processor and used CP/M or MS-DOS. Options included an 8 MB hard drive.

== Operations ==
As of 2020, Canon is organized into four principal business segments:

- The Office Business Unit (the products of which include copying machines, digital production printers, large format inkjet printers, laser printers and multi-function devices)
- The Imaging System Business Unit (the products of which include broadcasting equipment, calculators, compact digital cameras, digital SLR cameras, digital video camcorders, image scanners, interchangeable lenses, inkjet multifunction printers and single function inkjet printers)
- The Medical System Business Unit (the products of which include a broad range of medical equipment, such as ophthalmic equipment, CT, ultrasound scanners, and MRI)
- The Industry and Others Business Unit (the products of which include computers, handy terminals, magnetic heads, micromotors, flat panel display lithography equipment, semiconductor lithography equipment, and network cameras)

Canon Inc. has 383 subsidiaries as of 31 June 2017. The number includes second-generation subsidiaries, for example, Canon IT Solutions Inc.

Canon's world headquarters is located at 30-2 Shimomaruko 3-chome, Ota-ku, Tokyo 146–8501, Japan. Canon has regional headquarters in America, Europe, Middle East, Africa, Japan, Asia and Oceania (including Australia & New Zealand). Canon Europe has two principal subsidiaries: Canon Europa NV (based in Amstelveen, Netherlands) and Canon Europe Ltd. (based in Uxbridge, UK).

On 26 December 2003, Canon Inc. announced restructuring plans for three domestic Canon Group companies. The restructuring involved the merger of two companies and the spinning off of one.

Canon generated total revenues of US$45,608 million in 2011, of which 53.9% was by the Office Business Unit, 36.9% by the Consumer Business Unit and 11.8% by the Industry and Others Business Unit. (Note: Percentages do not add up to 100% due to eliminations used in consolidated accounting.) In the same year, 31.3% of revenues were generated in Europe, 27.0% in the Americas, 22.2% in Asia and Oceania (excl. Japan) and 19.5% in Japan.

Canon invested a total of US$3,946 million in research and development in 2011, equivalent to 8.7% of sales. In 2011, Canon was granted 2,813 patents in the United States, the third-highest number of any company (after IBM and Samsung Electronics).

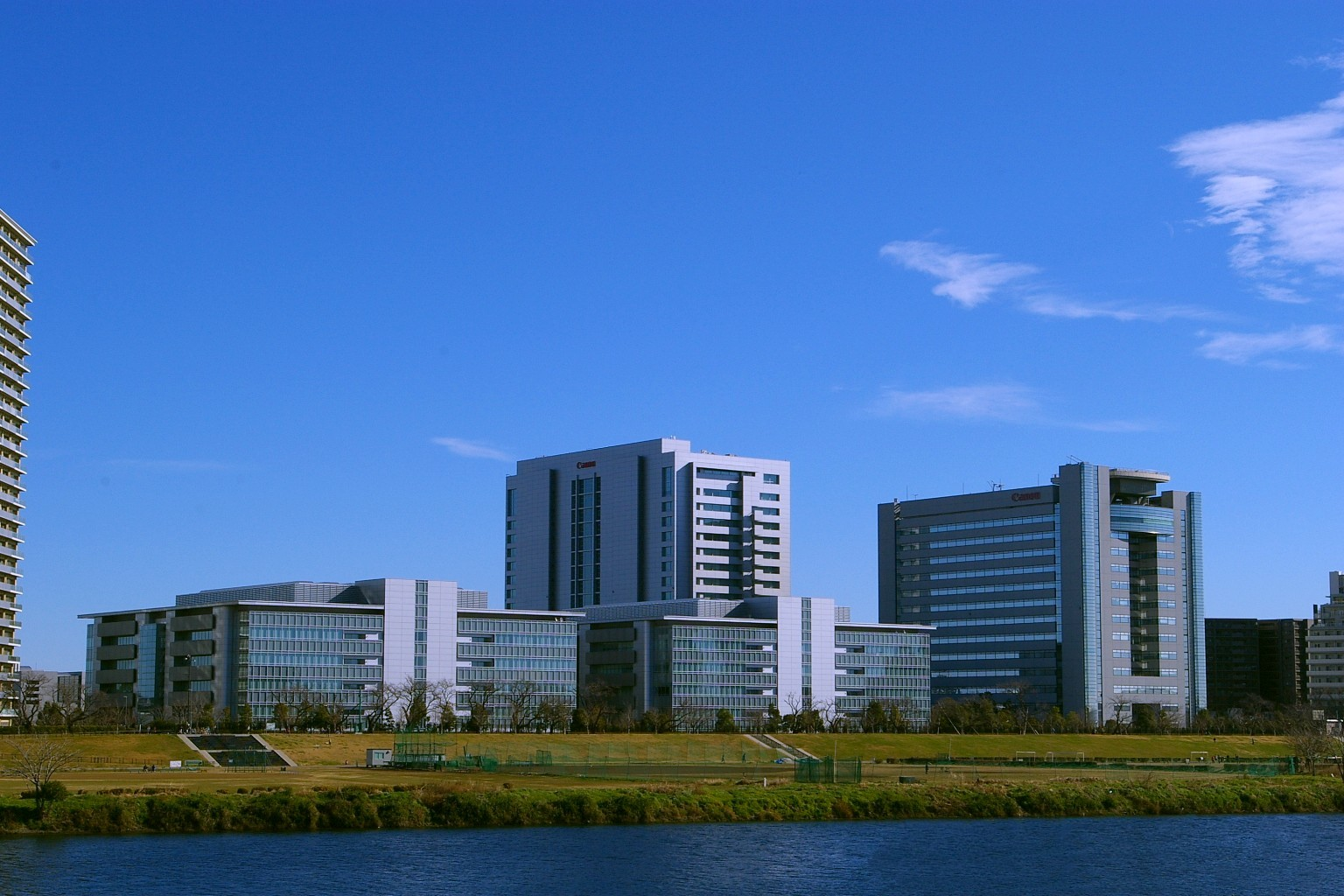
Canon world headquarters in Tokyo

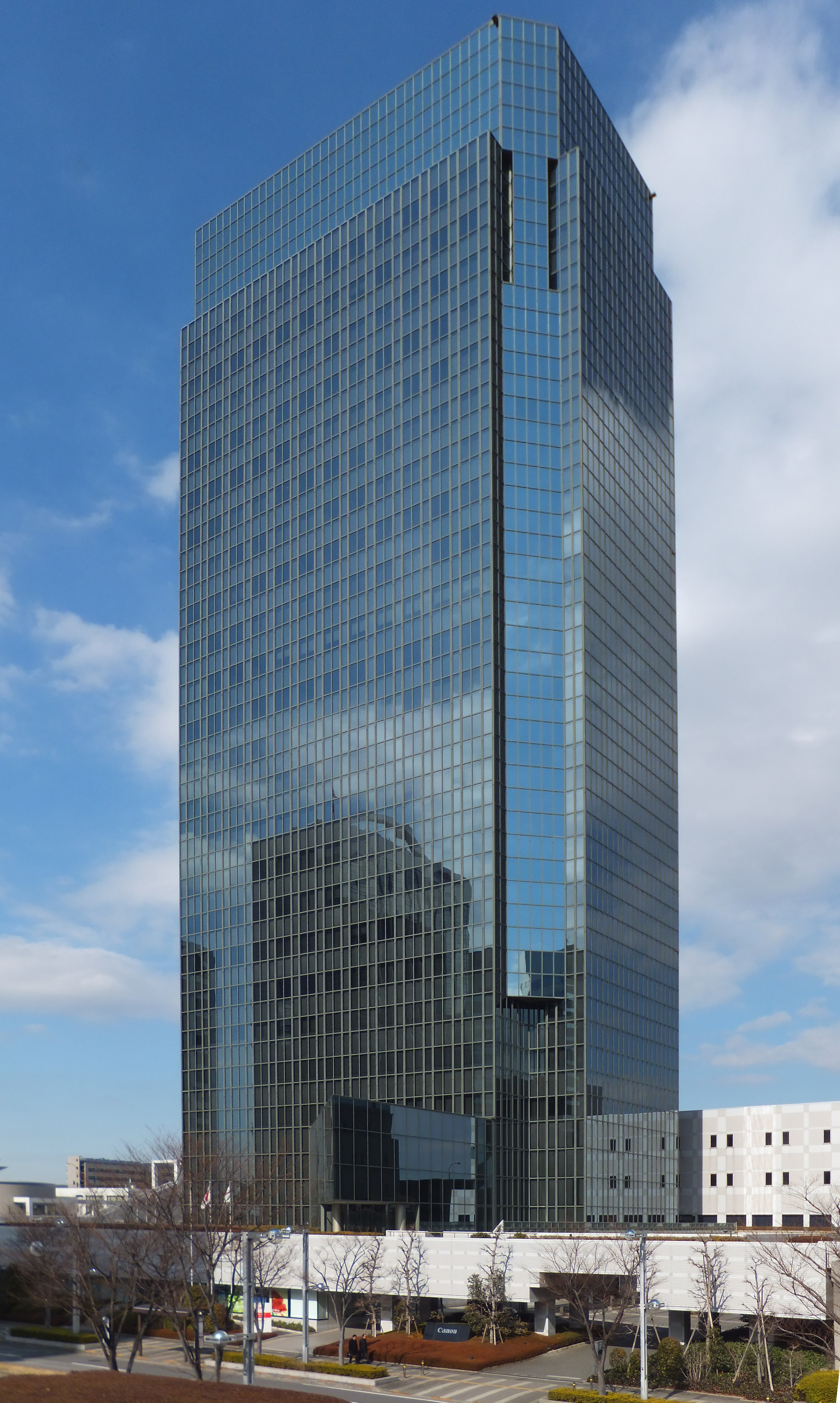
The Canon Marketing building in Makuhari, Japan

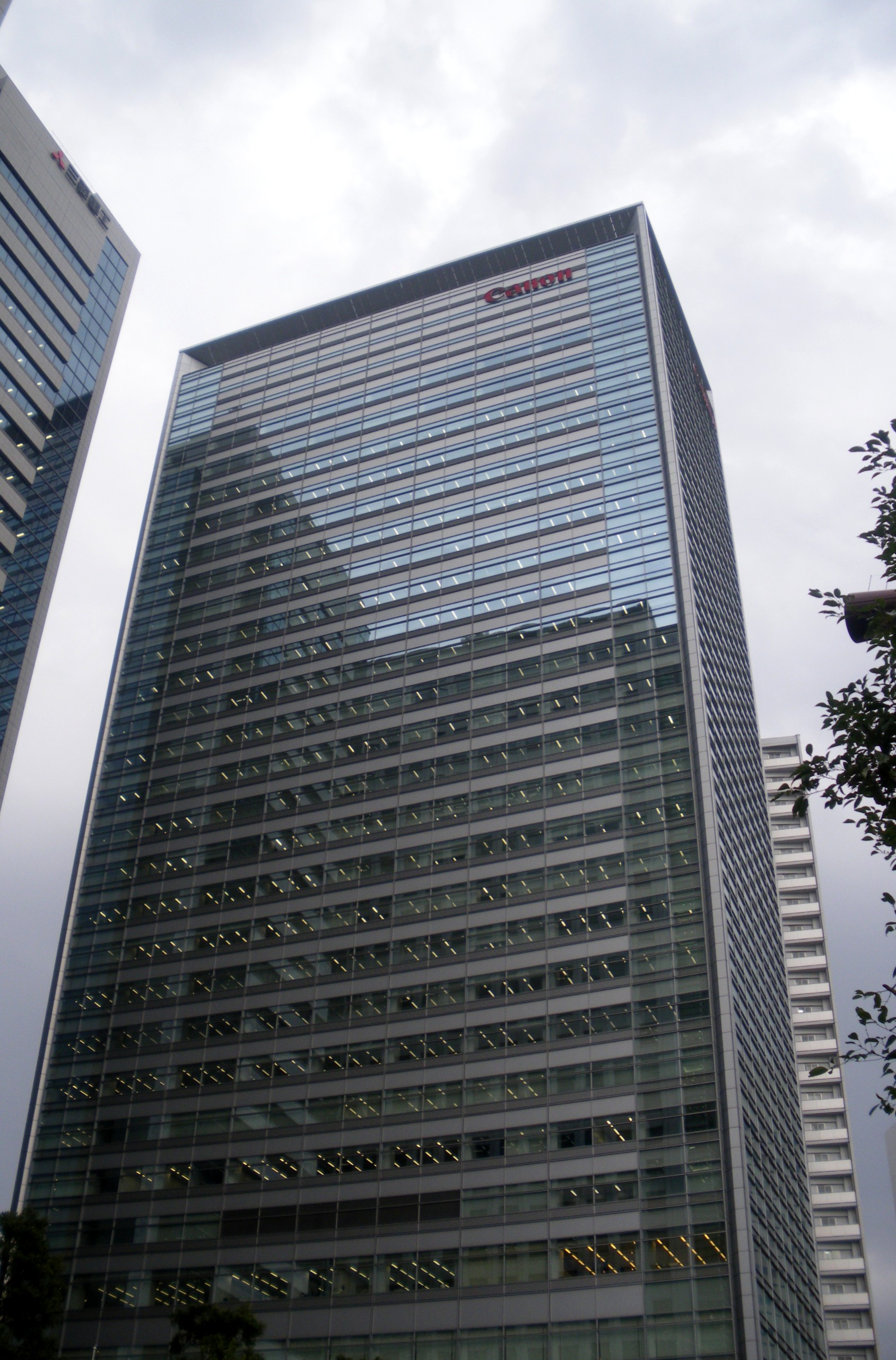
The Canon S Tower in Konan, Minato, Tokyo

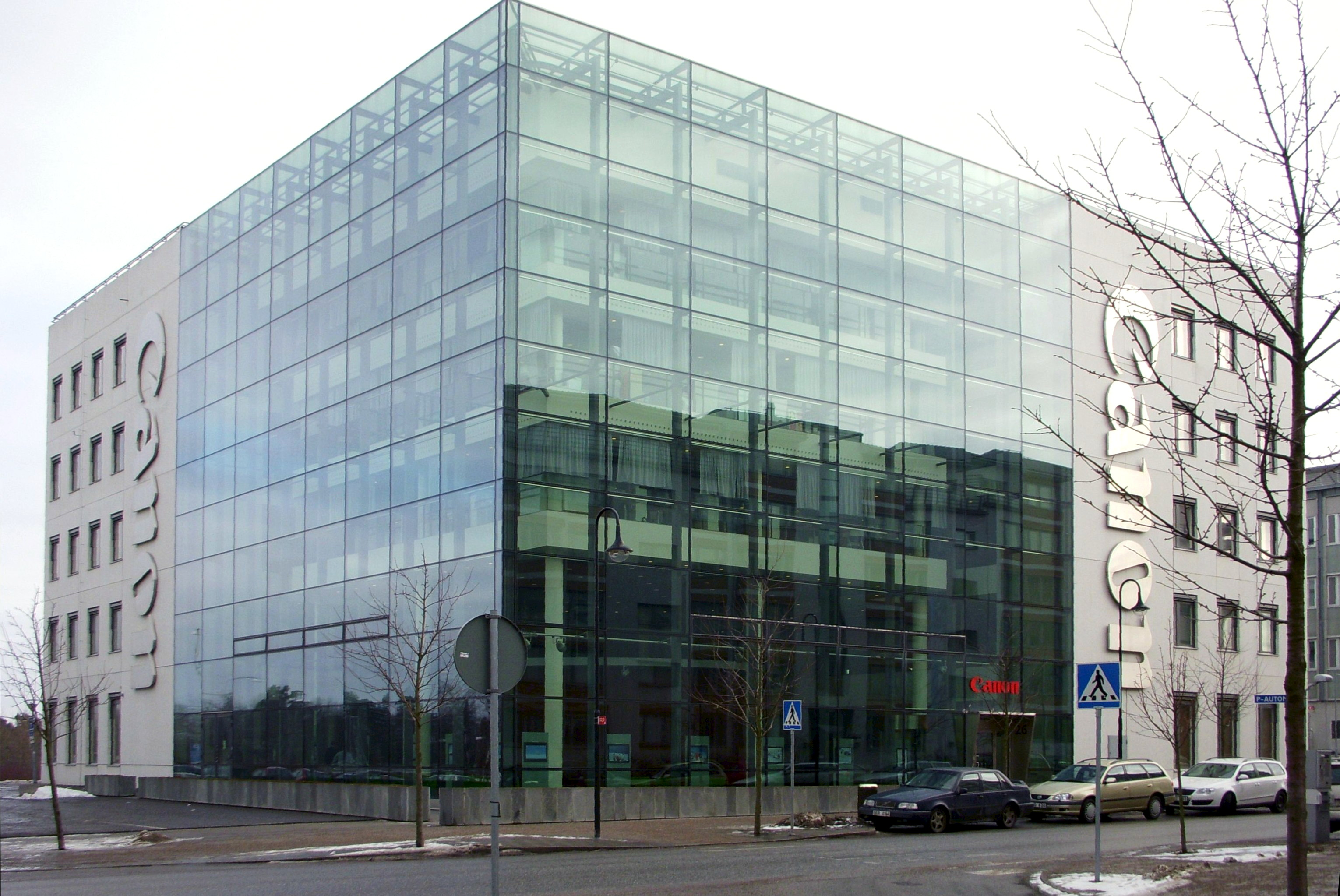
Canonhuset in Frösunda, Sweden

== Environmental record ==
A report by the environmental organization Clean Air-Cool Planet puts Canon at the top of a list of 56 companies the survey conducted on climate-friendly companies.

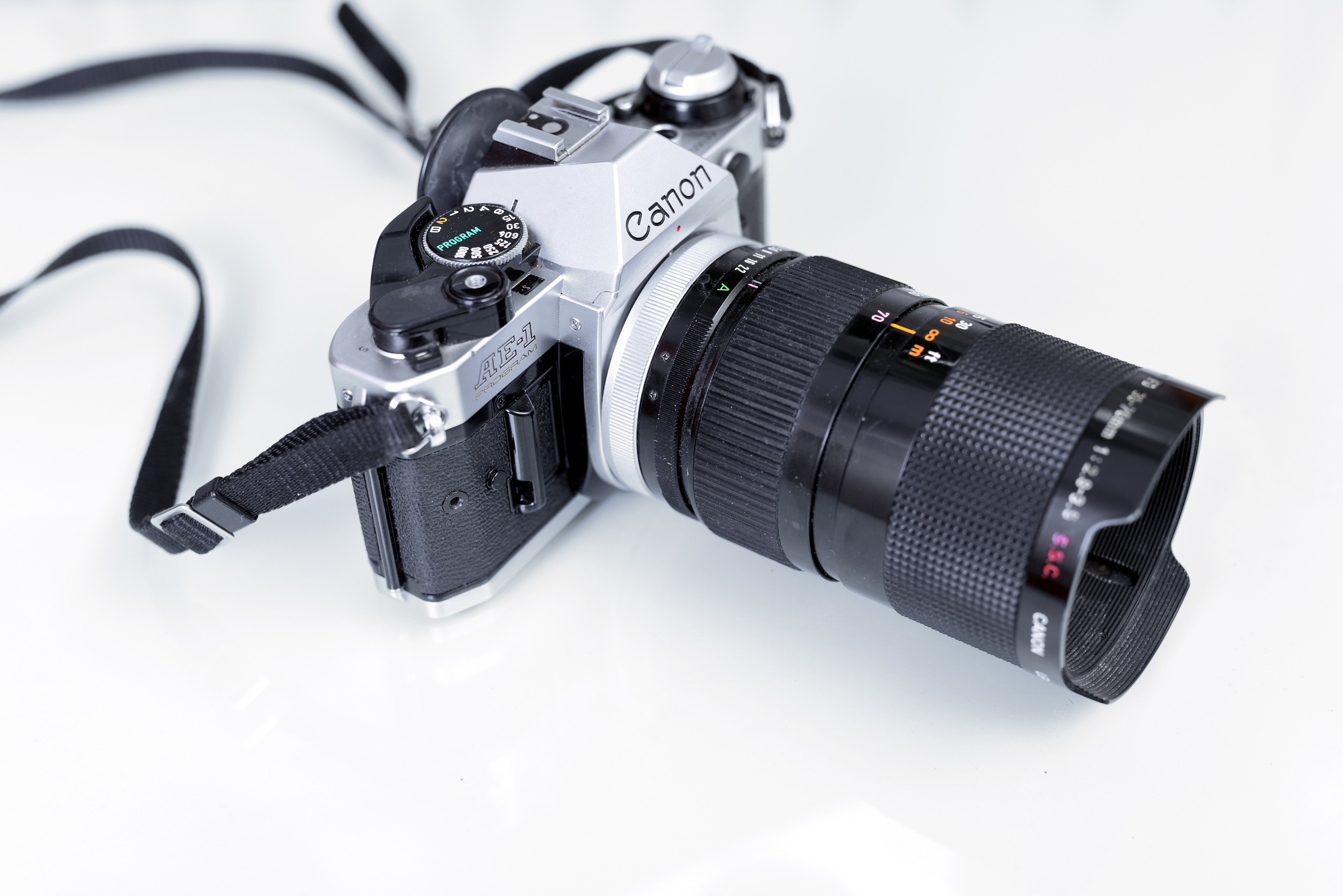
AE-1 Film Camera. AE stood for Automatic Exposure.

Canon has also launched three new calculators in Europe, called "Green Calculators", which are produced in part from recycled Canon copiers.

The Canon Group has an environmental charter which looks at "offering products with a lower environmental burden through improvements in resource efficiency, while eliminating anti-social activities that threaten the health and safety of mankind and the environment". In 2020, Canon joined WIPO GREEN as an official partner in an effort to address climate change.

=== Spreading global warming skepticism ===
While Canon's head office is committed to preventing global warming, its subsidiary, The Canon Institute for Global Studies (CIGS), has appointed anthropogenic global warming skeptic Taishi Sugiyama as its research director, and has been disseminating anthropogenic global warming skepticism and anti-renewable energy theories. When contacted by The Guardian, Canon responded that the Canon Institute for Global Studies is not a business of the company and that it is not in a position to comment on the institute's activities or research. However, CIGS was established in 2017 to commemorate the 70th anniversary of Canon Inc. and its chairman is Canon's CEO. This has been protested by the corporate watchdog group Action Speaks Louder and photographers in a "Cameras Don't Lie" contest.

== Charitable activities ==
In 2008, Canon donated financial support to help the estimated 5 million people displaced by the earthquake that hit China's Sichuan province in May 2008. RMB 1 million was donated to the Red Cross Society of China shortly after the earthquake. Canon Inc., Japan, soon followed with a donation of RMB 10 million.

== Sponsorships ==
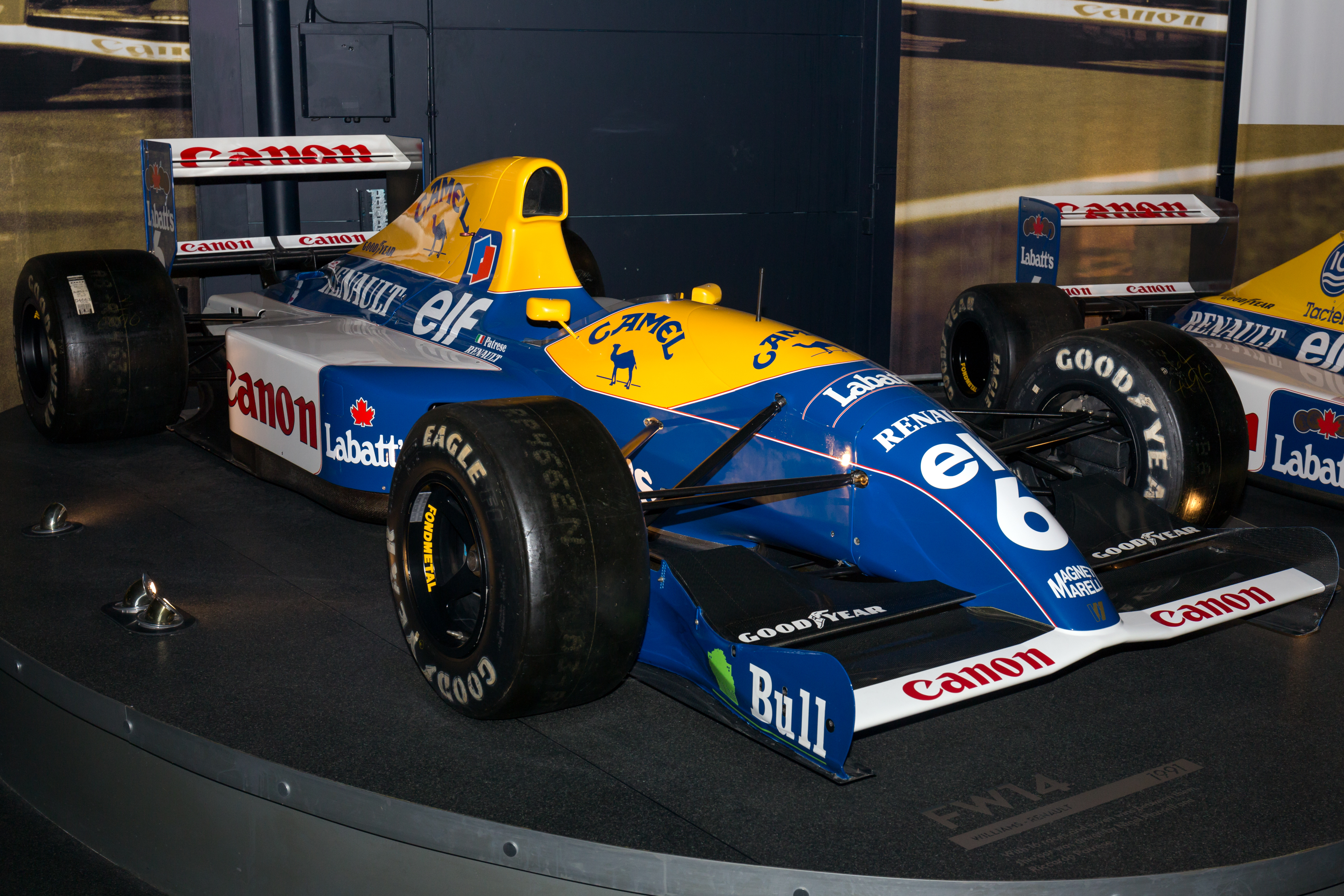
Canon sponsored Williams FW14.

In 1983, Canon came as the first title sponsors of the English football league The Football League, which was named The Canon League from 1983 to 1986, when the sponsorship was taken over by the Today newspaper. Canon also sponsored Italian football club Hellas Verona FC between 1982 and 1986 including during the 1984–85 Serie A which they won.

From 1985 to 2002, Canon was title sponsor of the Greater Hartford Open, now Travelers Championship. In Formula One, Canon sponsored Williams between 1985 and 1993, while they won World Drivers Championships for Nelson Piquet (1987), Nigel Mansell (1992) and Alain Prost (1993) and Four World Constructors Championships (1986, 1987, 1992, 1993). In the 2009 Singapore Grand Prix, Canon sponsored Brawn GP. Between 1992 and 1997 it also sponsored the South Sydney Rabbitohs. Since 2006, Canon has been helping the Red Cross provide support to 13 Red Cross National Societies across Europe, with focus on youth projects. Support from Canon includes financial contributions and donations of imaging equipment, including cameras, copying machines and digital radiography devices, as well as volunteer activities.

Canon Europe has been a partner of World Press Photo for 16 years. World Press Photo promotes the professional standards in photography; organises the largest international contest for professional photojournalists; and acts as a worldwide platform for press photography.

Canon Asia sponsored many competitions such as Canon Photomarathon and reality TV show Photo Face-Off. The latter is a reality TV show in which professional photographer Justin Mott is the judge and competes against amateur photographers. Mott started filming season 3 in April 2016 and that season aired at the end of that same year.

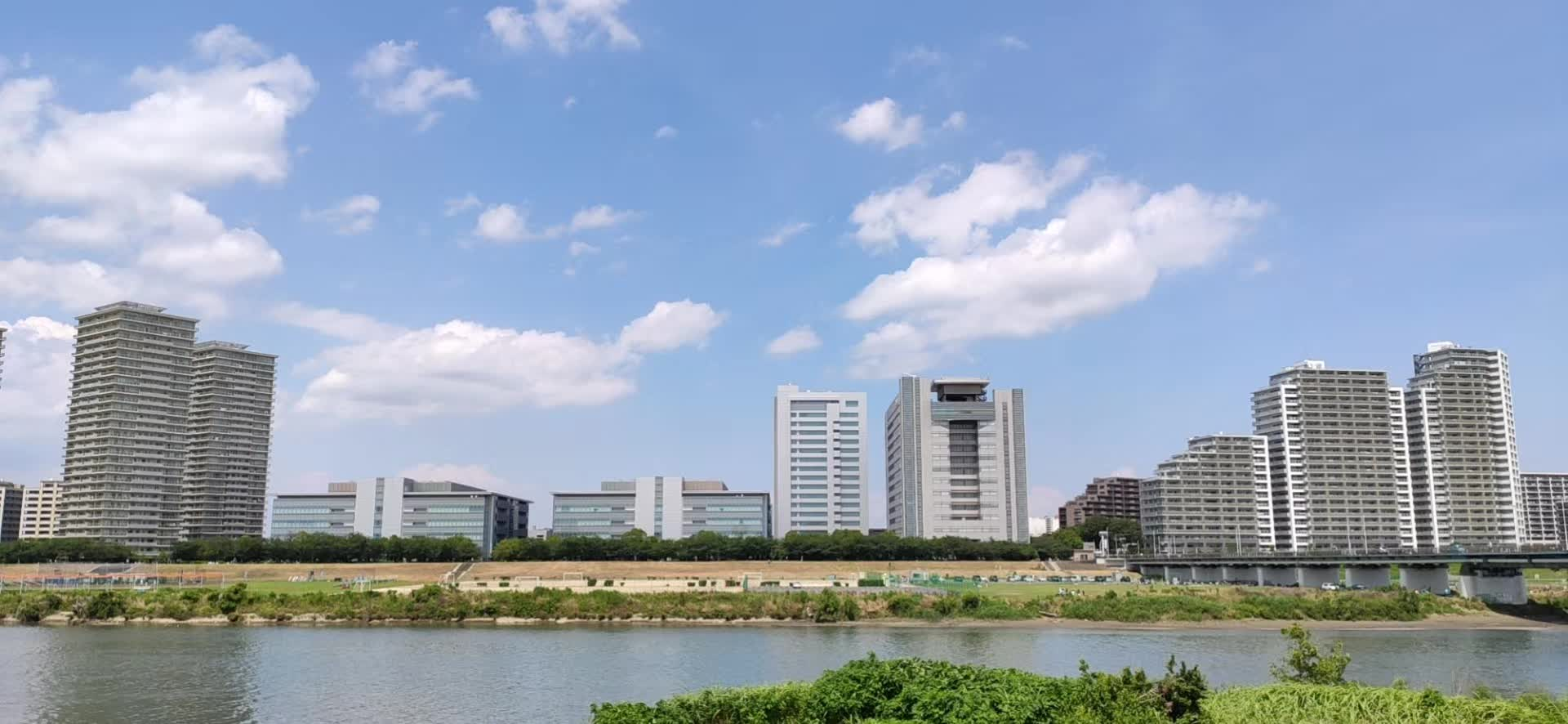
Buildings of Canon

== See also ==
- Canon Open
- Nikon

== Notes ==
Class	1987	1988	1989	1990	1991	1992	1993	1994	1995	1996	1997	1998	1999	2000	2001	2002	2003	2004	2005	2006	2007	…	2018
Professional				1					1N					1V									
Professional				RT					1N RS														
High-end				10			5						3										
Advanced		620		600		100				50					30				30V				
Midrange	650				1000F	1000F N		500			500N			300			300V		300X				
Entry-level		750	850	700					5000				3000			3000N		3000V					
Entry-level											IX												
Entry-level												IX 7											

Type	Sensor	Class	00	01	02	03	04	05	06	07	08	09	10	11	12	13	14	15	16	17	18	19	20	21	22	23	24	25	26
DSLR	Full-frame	Flagship				1Ds		1Ds Mk II			1Ds Mk III					1D C													
DSLR	Full-frame	Flagship				1Ds		1Ds Mk II			1Ds Mk III				1D X					1D X Mk II ^{T}			1D X Mk III ^{T}						
DSLR	APS-H	Flagship			1D			1D Mk II	1D Mk II N		1D Mk III		1D Mk IV																
DSLR	Full-frame	Professional																	5DS / 5DS R										
DSLR	Full-frame	Professional							5D			_{x} 5D Mk II			_{x} 5D Mk III					5D Mk IV ^{T}									
DSLR	Full-frame	Advanced														_{x} 6D					_{x} 6D Mk II ^{AT}								
DSLR	APS-C	Advanced											_{x} 7D					_{x} 7D Mk II											
DSLR	APS-C	Mid-range						20Da								_{x} 60Da ^{A}													
DSLR	APS-C	Mid-range		D30	D60	10D		20D	30D		40D	_{x} 50D		_{x} 60D ^{A}			_{x} 70D ^{AT}		80D ^{AT}				90D ^{AT}						
DSLR	APS-C	Mid-range																	760D ^{AT}		77D ^{AT}								
DSLR	APS-C	Entry-level					300D	350D		400D	450D	_{x} 500D	_{x} 550D	_{x} 600D ^{A}		_{x} 650D ^{AT}	_{x} 700D ^{AT}		_{x} 750D ^{AT}		800D ^{AT}			850D ^{AT}					
DSLR	APS-C	Entry-level															_{x} 100D ^{T}		_{x} 200D ^{AT}				250D ^{AT}						
DSLR	APS-C	Entry-level										1000D		_{x} 1100D			_{x} 1200D			1300D		2000D							
DSLR	APS-C	Value																				4000D							
Early models			Canon EOS DCS 5 (1995); Canon EOS DCS 3 (1995); Canon EOS DCS 1 (1995); Canon EOS D2000 (1998); Canon EOS D6000 (1998)																										
Type	Sensor	Spec																											
Type	Sensor	Spec	00	01	02	03	04	05	06	07	08	09	10	11	12	13	14	15	16	17	18	19	20	21	22	23	24	25	26
