= Canon Tokki =

Subsidiary of Canon Inc.

Canon Tokki Corporation
- Formerly: Tsugami Machine Specality Co. (1967–1986); Tokki Corporation (1986–2012)
- Type: Subsidiary
- Industry: Manufacturing equipment
- Founded: July 29, 1967; 58 years ago
- Headquarters: Japan,
- Area served: Worldwide
- Key people: Teruhisa Tsugami (chairman and CEO)
- Products: OLED manufacturing equipment, vacuum deposition systems
- Number of employees: 633 (2018)
- Parent: Canon Inc. (2010–present)
- Website: tokki.canon

Canon Tokki Corporation is a Japanese manufacturer of material deposition equipment for making OLED displays. It is a wholly owned subsidiary of Canon Inc. and has a near-monopoly in its main business field.

== History ==
The company began producing Factory Automation systems, machine tools and production tools. In 1983 it began to produce vacuum thin film deposition equipment. In 1986, Tsugami Specialty Machine, Nagaoka Precision, Tsugami Robotics, and UPR Co., Ltd. merged to form Tokki Corporation Ltd. It began OLED material deposition equipment research in 1993, and in 1996, it started to sell its OLED material deposition equipment.

In 1999, Tokki developed the first OLED mass production system that processes both OLED and electrode material deposition as well as encapsulation by one system. The company also produces commercial encapsulation tools for laboratory and mass manufacturing. Canon Tokki and Sunic of Korea are the only two major manufacturers of production-scale OLED thin-film deposition equipment of G6 and above.

In 2001 it purchased the Niigata Factory from Niigata Keiso Co., Ltd., which became Tokki's main production base. In 2004, Tokki spun off its Factory Automation division forming the subsidiary Tokki Industries Co., Ltd. In 2009, Tokki moved its headquarters from Tokyo to its factory in Niigata. In 2010, Tokki sold Tokki Industries Co., Ltd to Marubeni Corporation. In 2010, Tokki was bought by Canon Inc., and in 2012 it changed its name to Canon Tokki.

An increase in orders enabled the company to double production capacity in 2016, but in 2018 the demand went down as a recovery in the equipment market had been lagged behind that of the display market.
