= Fujio Mitarai =

Chairman of Canon (born 1935)

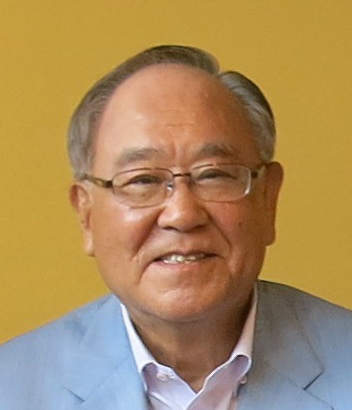
- Mitarai in 2015
- Born: Fujio Mitarai; September 23, 1935 (age 91); Kamae, Ōita, Japan
- Education: Chuo University
- Occupations: Chairman and CEO of Canon Inc.; External Director Japan Post Holdings (2013–16)

Fujio Mitarai (御手洗 冨士夫, Mitarai Fujio; born September 23, 1935) is the chairman and CEO of Canon inc. He studied law at Chuo University, and was President of Canon in the USA until 1989.

Mitarai combined elements of Eastern and Western management approaches in leading Canon. During a period of organizational restructuring, he implemented changes that contributed to the company's return to profitability. This management approach later became known as "the Mitarai Way"

== Career ==
Although Mitarai's three older brothers followed his father's footsteps to pursue medicine, Mitarai he took after his uncle, Takeshi Mitarai, and joined his company in 1961 at Canon. Originally training as an accountant, Mitarai was later sent to the US to help Canon develop in the camera market. Upon arrival he discovered a financial disaster. He discovered that only $6,000 had been made on sales of $3 million. The auditors that advised Mitarai told him Canon should close its US operations and put the money in the bank as it would make more money off the interest. However, he chose to ignore their advice and take on the challenge of turning the company around.

Mitarai noticed that Canon's US division was drastically inefficient especially when it came to their corporate structure. When Mitarai took an in-depth look at the company's corporate structure, he noticed that the different divisions within the company became so independent that they only thought about what would benefit their division, not the entire company. The lack of communication between divisions was astounding and it got to the point where divisions would be building separate factories in China at the same time. This kind of inefficiency cost Canon dearly and in certain instances it would cost the company twice as much to do something. This was due to the fact that different branches would plan separately instead of together which would have allowed them to combine their costs.

However, Mitarai didn't just overhaul the company's corporate structure. He was also responsible for launching several new Canon products, notably the Canon AE-1 35mm SLR camera that allowed amateur photographers to take high quality photos. These cameras helped Canon get to the top of the camera market and helped the company build the reputation that it possesses today. In 1984 Mitarai struck a deal with Hewlett-Packard (HP) to produce photocopiers using HP software and Canon laser printing. In 1989 Mitarai returned to Japan and found that several of the company's divisions were in the red, however he was unable to do anything about it until 1995 when he was made CEO. He began to shut down unprofitable divisions within the company and turned the focus of the company from sales to profits, and rewarded Canon's best performing staff. In Mitarai's quest to generate profits he also began to provide performance incentives to his managers. And in turn, the company's devoted managers contributed even more to the company's bottom line.
