= Shimomaruko =

Shimomaruko 下丸子
- District
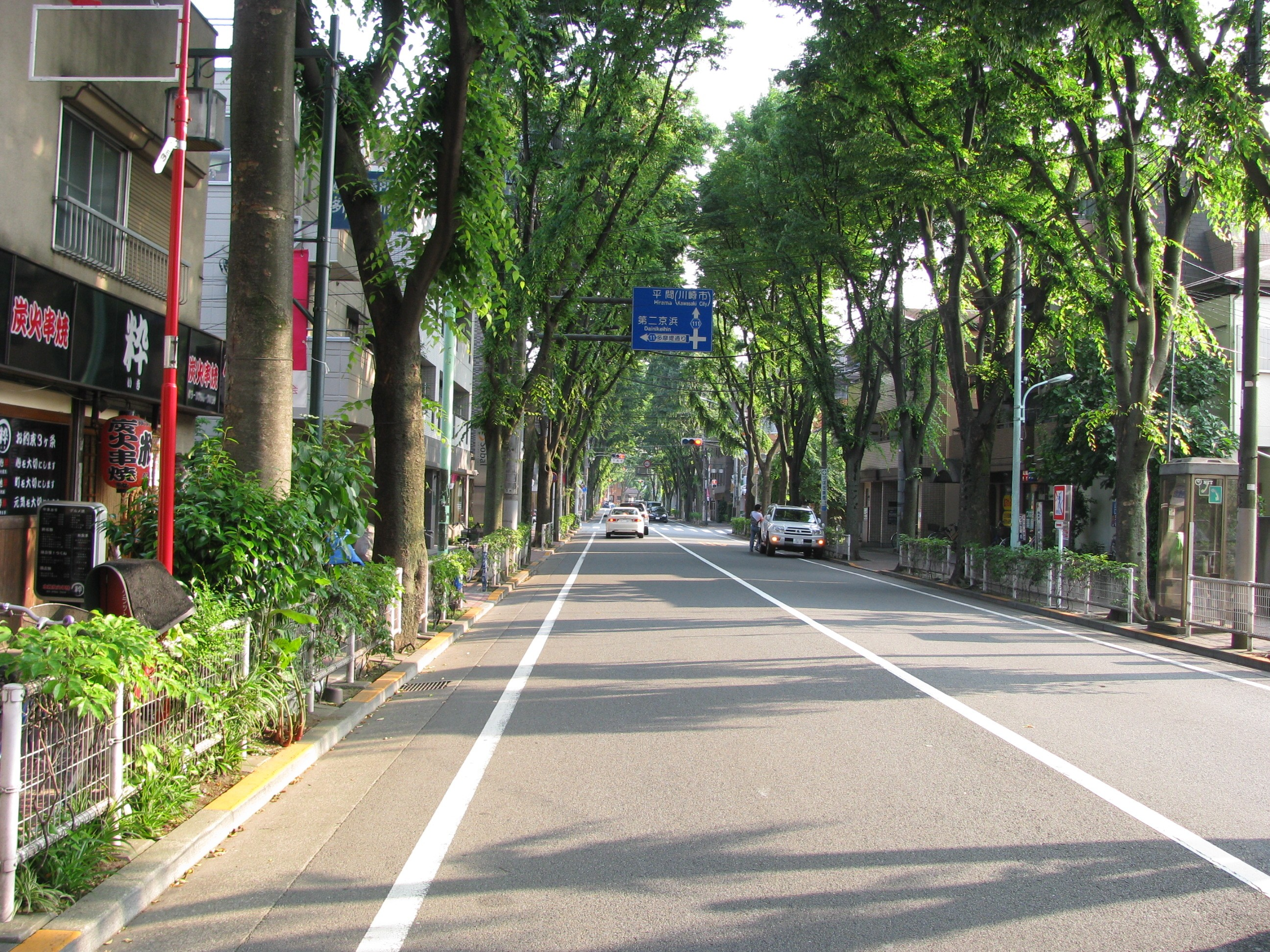
- Interactive map of Shimomaruko
- Coordinates: 35°34′12″N 139°41′20″E
- Country: Japan
- City: Tokyo
- Ward: Ōta
- Area: Kamata Area

Population (December 1, 2015)
  - Total: 23,004
- Time zone: UTC+9 (JST)
- Postal code: 146-0092
- Area code: 03

Shimomaruko (下丸子) is a district of Ōta, Tokyo, Japan. As of December 1, 2015, the population in the district is 23,004. The postal code is 146-0092.

== Facilities ==
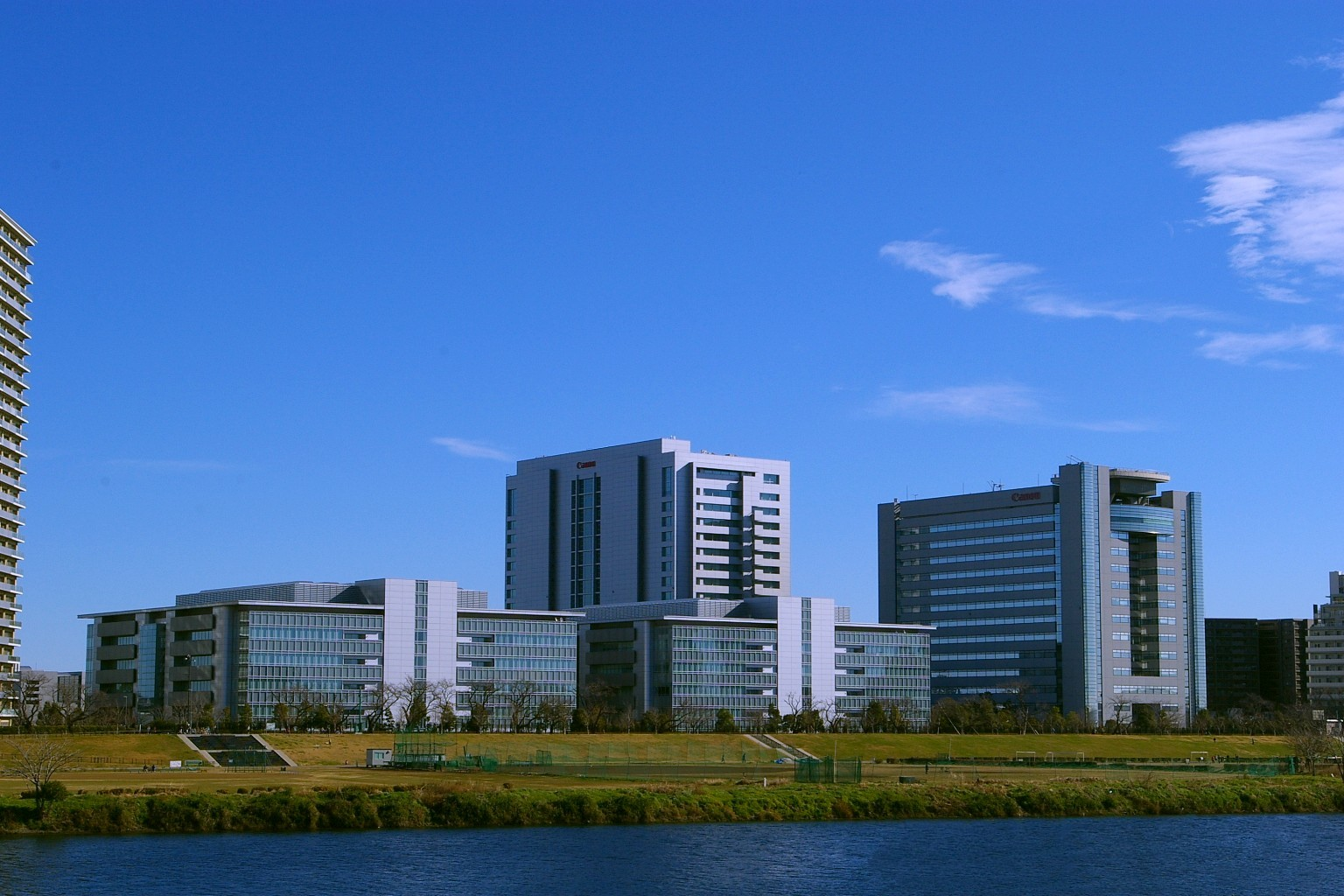
Main office of Canon Inc.

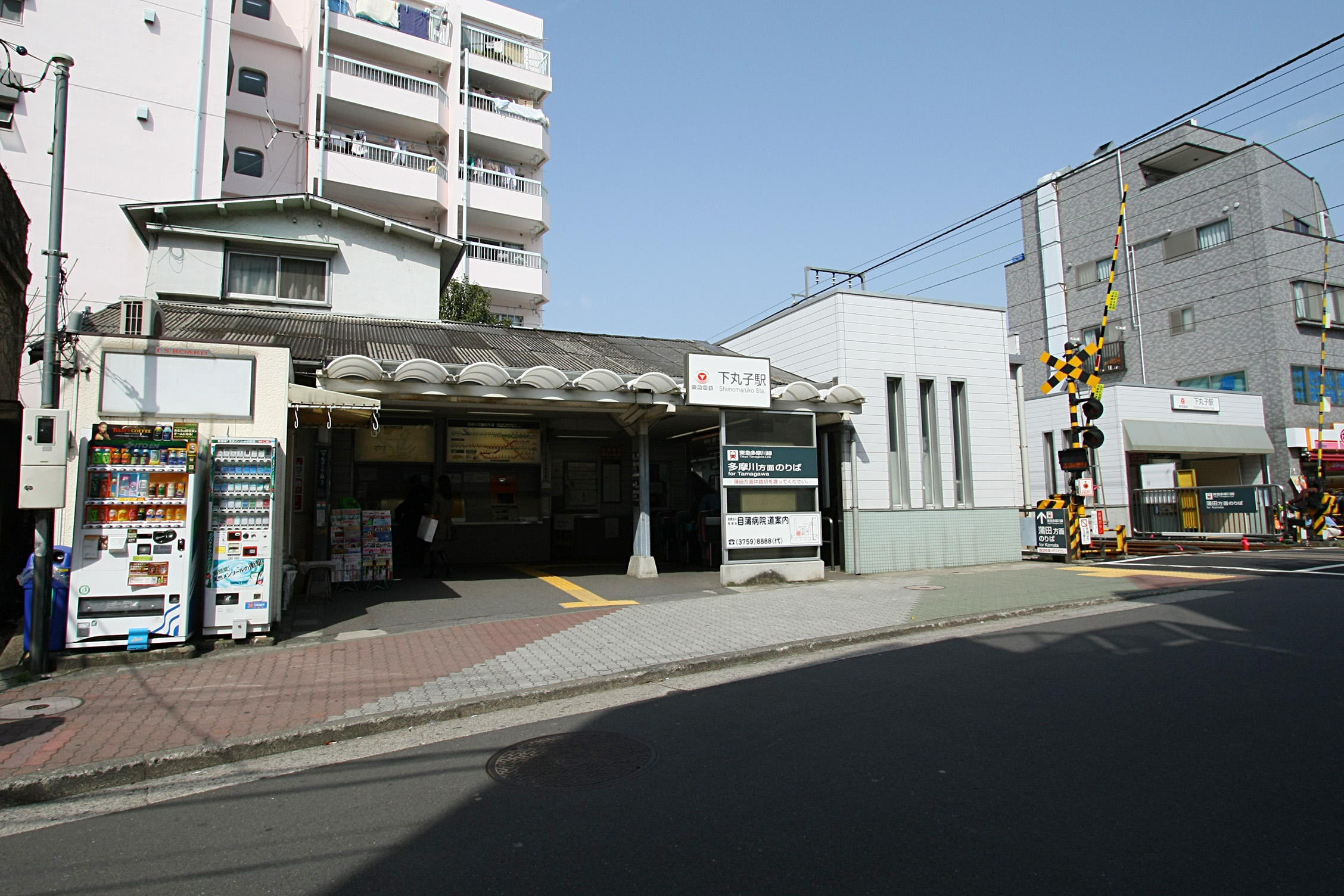
Shimomaruko Station
