= Justin Mott =

American Photographer

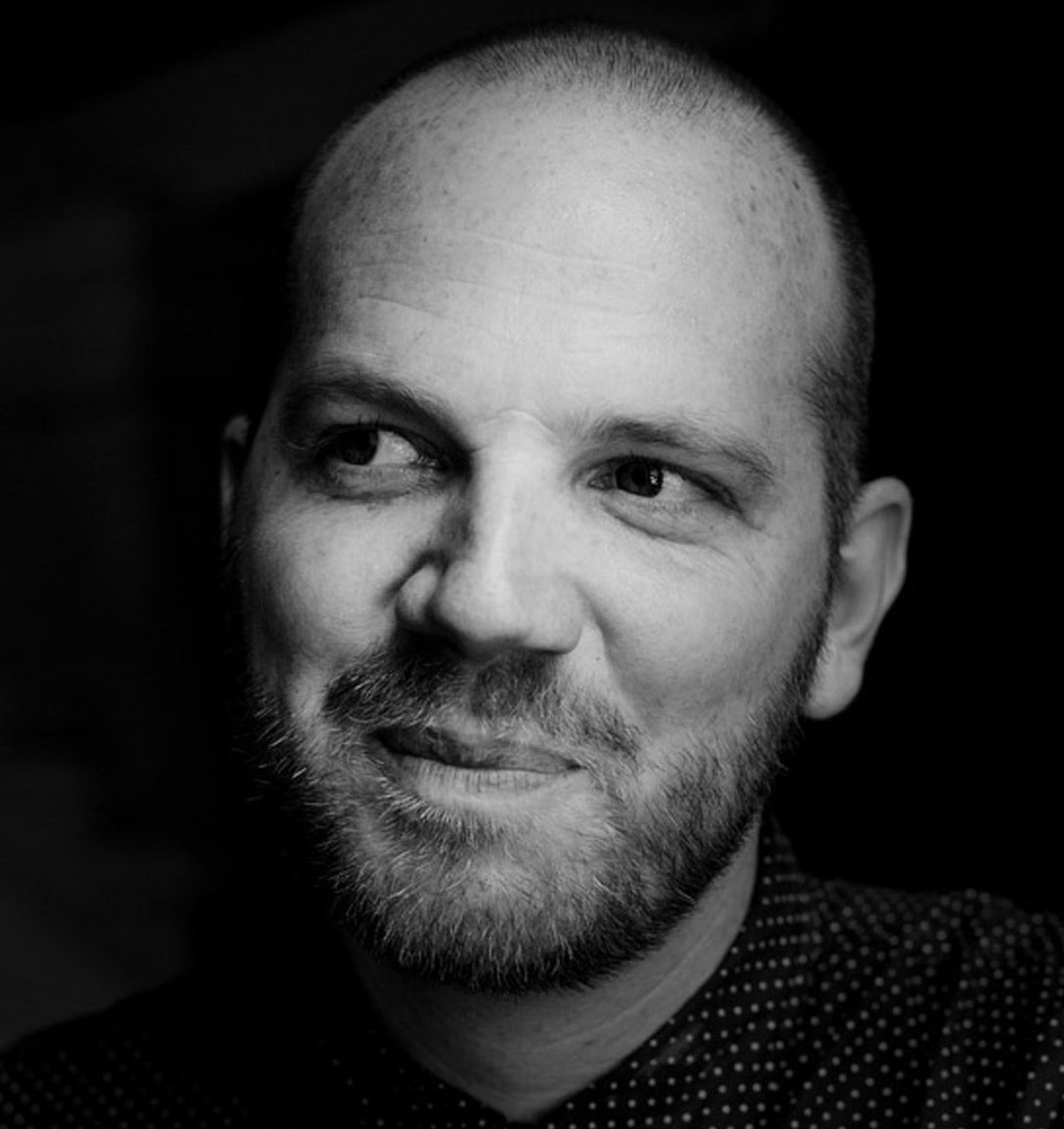
- Justin Mott
- Born: 1978 (age 47–48); Rhode Island
- Education: San Francisco State University
- Occupations: Editorial and Commercial Photographer in Vietnam Founder of Mott Visuals Founder of ASKMOTT
- Years active: 2004–present
- Television: Photo Face-Off
- Spouse: Quynh Anh Mott (Married 2018 - Present)
- Website: http://www.justinmott.com

Justin Mott (born 1978) is an American photographer living in Vietnam. Mott specializes in editorial and commercial photography and is the founder of Mott Visuals production house based in Vietnam. He is also known for his wildlife photojournalism and conservation photography documentary work on the northern white rhinos featured in the Washington Post and featured in a Leica Witness global campaign. He is currently working on a long-term, self-funded project, Kindred Guardians, documenting people all over the world who dedicate their lives to helping animals. He was the resident professional photographer on Photo Face-Off, a reality TV show on History Channel for 5 seasons in which Mott competes against and judges amateur photographers throughout Southeast Asia.

== Early life and education ==
Mott was born in Rhode Island in 1978. He moved to San Francisco in 1999 and studied photojournalism at San Francisco State University from 2002 to 2006. He was selected to the Eddie Adams Workshop in 2007. In 2007 he moved to Vietnam full-time.

== Career ==
Mott was heavily influenced by Magnum photographer Philip Jones Griffiths' book Agent Orange: Collateral Damage in Viet Nam. In 2005 Mott traveled to Vietnam to work on his own documentary project about Agent Orange victims. His project, titled "Legacy of Horror", was later published in Newsweek, awarded the Marty Forscher Fellowship for humanistic photography by the Parsons School of Design in New York, and published in the PDN Annual Photography Awards Issue.

In 2007 Mott moved to Hanoi to work as a photojournalist. He has been working as a contributing photographer for The New York Times in Southeast Asia since 2007. Mott has photographed over 100 diverse assignments for the Times covering a wide spectrum of topics throughout the region.

In 2009, Mott founded Mott Visuals, a commercial photography and video production house based in Vietnam.

In 2013 Mott's work "Changing Face of Vietnam" was featured on the BBC.

In 2019 Mott started an online photography educational platform ASKMOTT and accompanying YouTube channel.

In 2019 his personal project photographing the beauty of Vietnam was featured in National Geographic.

In 2020 Mott's conservation photography documentary of the last northern white rhino was featured in Leica's Global Witness Campaign.

Mott is currently working on a long term personal project titled "Kindred Guardians" dedicated to photographing the stories of people around the world who dedicate their lives to animal welfare and animal conservation.

- Awards
- 2019: IPA International Photography Awards. Kindred Guardians series documenting the plight of the last two remaining northern white rhinos.
- 2008: Marty Forscher Fellowship for humanistic photography by the Parson's School of Design in New York. PDN Annual, NPPA, CPOY, and the Missouri School of Journalism.
- 2013: One Shot – Extraordinary category of Travel Photographer of the Year, international.

== Television ==
Year	Channel	Title	Role	Other
2014	History	Photo Face-Off	Resident photographer	trailers
2015	History	Photo Face-Off, season 2	Resident photographer and co-host	6 episodes, trailers
2016	History	Photo Face-Off Season 3	Resident photographer, co-host, and consulting producer	5 episodes, trailers, and promotion
2017	History	Photo Face-Off Season 4	Resident photographer, co-host, and consulting producer	6 episodes, trailers, and promotion
