= Takeshi Mitarai =

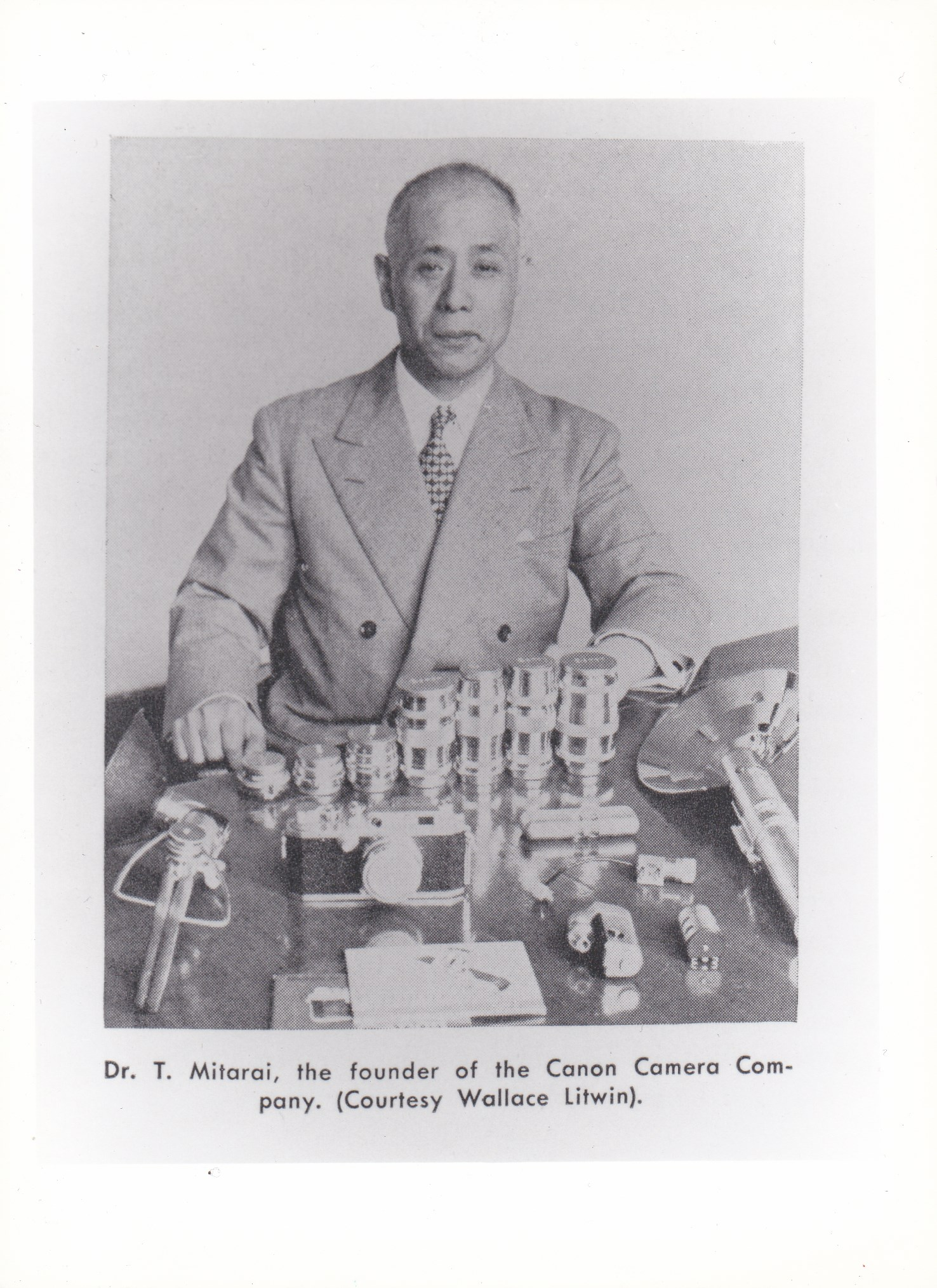
Takeshi Mitarai

Takeshi Mitarai (御手洗 毅, Mitarai Takeshi; 11 March 1901 – 12 October 1984) was one of the founders of Canon Inc. He established Canon in 1937 along with Goro Yoshida, Saburo Uchida and Takeo Maeda.

== Biography ==
In 1942, Takeshi Mitarai, became president of the company. He was an obstetrician by profession. He had been the auditor of Precision Optical Industry before assuming the presidency. Even earlier, Mitarai had established Mitarai Obstetrics and Gynaecology Hospital in Mejiro, Tokyo.
