= Toyoda =

Toyoda is the romanization of Japanese "豊田" (fertilized landfield, also romanized as Toyota). It may refer to:

== People ==
- Fumio Toyoda (1947–2001), Japanese aikido shihan and founder of Aikido Association of America
- Noriyo Toyoda (born 1967), a Japanese professional wrestler
- Shirō Toyoda (1906–1977), Japanese film director
- Soemu Toyoda (1885–1957), Japanese admiral of World War II
- Teijirō Toyoda (1885–1961), Japanese admiral and cabinet minister in World War II
- Toshiaki Toyoda (born 1969), Japanese film director
- Toshihisa Toyoda (born 1940), Japanese economist
- Toyoda Toru, one of the perpetrators of the Sarin gas attack on the Tokyo subway
- Yohei Toyoda (born 1985), Japanese footballer
- Yasumitsu Toyoda (1935–2016), Japanese Baseball Hall of Fame shortstop

=== Toyota Motor Corporation ===
- Akio Toyoda (born 1956), president of the Toyota Motor Corporation
- Eiji Toyoda (1913–2013), Japanese industrialist, and largely responsible for the success of the Toyota Motor Corporation
- Kiichiro Toyoda (1894–1952), creator of what was to become the Toyota Motor Corporation
- Rizaburo Toyoda (1884–1952), the first president both of the Toyota Industries and Toyota Motor Corporation
- Sakichi Toyoda (1867–1930), Japanese inventor and the founder of Toyota Industries Corporation Co., Ltd.
- Shoichiro Toyoda (1925–2023), chairman of the Toyota Motor Corporation 1992–1999
- Tatsuro Toyoda (1930–2017), Japanese businessman

== Other uses ==
- Toyoda, Shizuoka, a town in Iwata District, Shizuoka, Japan
- Toyoda Station, a rail station in Hino, Tokyo, Japan
- Toyoda Machine Works

== See also ==
- Toyota (disambiguation)
