= Toyota (disambiguation) =

Toyota (Toyota Motor Corporation, or TMC) is a multinational corporation headquartered in the city of the same name in Japan.

Toyota may also refer to:

== Organisations ==
=== Businesses ===
- Toyota Group
  - Toyota Australia, a subsidiary of Toyota Motor Corporation
  - Toyota Boshoku, a Japanese automotive component manufacturer
  - Toyota Central R&D Labs, the arch institute of the Toyota Group; it cooperates with Toyota Group and Toyota Technological Institute
  - Toyota Financial Services Corporation (TFSC), a wholly owned subsidiary of Toyota Motor Corporation (TMC) responsible for the financial services subsidiaries globally
  - Toyota Industries, a Japanese machine maker
  - Toyota Tsusho, a sōgō shōsha (trading company)
- Toyota Racing Development, the in-house tuning shop for all Toyota, Lexus and formerly Scion cars

=== Institutions ===
- Toyota Technological Institute, a university in Nagoya, Japan
- Toyota Technological Institute at Chicago, United States, for research and education in computer science

== People with the surname ==
- Lauren Toyota, Canadian television personality
- Maho Toyota (born 1967), Japanese actress
- Manami Toyota (born 1971), Japanese professional wrestler
- Moe Toyota (born 1995), Japanese voice actress

== Places ==
- Toyota, Aichi, a city in Aichi, Japan
- Toyota, Yamaguchi, a town in Toyoura District, Yamaguchi, Japan
- Toyota District, Hiroshima, a district in Hiroshima, Japan
- Toyota Prefectural Natural Park Yamaguchi, Japan

== Sports ==
=== Events ===
- Toyota All-Star Showdown, an auto race in the United States
- Toyota Grand Prix of Long Beach, an auto race in the United States
- Toyota Pro/Celebrity Race, an auto race in the United States
- ToyotaCare 250, a NASCAR Xfinity Series race that takes place at Richmond Raceway in Richmond, Virginia
  - 2019 ToyotaCare 250, a NASCAR Xfinity Series race held on April 12, 2019, at Richmond Raceway in Richmond, Virginia
- Toyota/Save Mart 350, an auto race in the United States

=== Teams ===
- Toyota Industries S.C., a Japanese football club, owned by Toyota Industries
- Toyota Industries Shuttles, a Japanese rugby union club, owned by Toyota Industries
- Toyota Super Corollas, a defunct basketball team in the Philippines
- Toyota Verblitz, a Japanese rugby union club, owned by Toyota Motor

== Sports arenas ==
- Toyota Arena (disambiguation)
  - Generali Arena or Toyota Arena, a sports stadium in Prague, Czech Republic
- Toyota Center (disambiguation)
  - Toyota Center, a sports arena in Houston, Texas
  - Toyota Sports Center, a sports stadium in El Segundo, California
- Toyota Park (disambiguation)
  - Toyota Park, a sports stadium in Bridgeview, Illinois
- Toyota Stadium (disambiguation)
  - Toyota Stadium (Cronulla), a sports stadium in Cronulla, New South Wales, Australia
  - Toyota Stadium (Japan), a sports stadium in Toyota, Japan

== Other uses ==
- The Toyota Way, a set of principles and behaviors that underlie the Toyota Motor Corporation's managerial approach and production system
- Toyota Production System, an integrated socio-technical system developed by Toyota

== See also ==
- List of Toyota engines
- List of Toyota manufacturing facilities
- List of Toyota transmissions
- List of Toyota vehicles
- Toyoda (disambiguation)
