= Toyota Central R&D Labs =

Research institute of the Toyota Group

Coordinates: 35°10′11″N 137°03′16″E

Toyota Central R&D Labs., Inc. (TCRDL) (Japanese: 豊田中央研究所, romanized: Toyota Chuou Kenkyuusho) is the research institute of the Toyota Group. It cooperates with Toyota Group and Toyota Technological Institute (TTI) as the primary research and development cell, with research spanning various fields, including resource conservation, energy conservation, and environmental preservation, and safety.

The facility is located in Nagakute, near Nagoya in Aichi, Japan. The facility was established in November 1960 with a capital of 500 million yen. Currently, there are about 1000 employees conducting both fundamental and applied research in a large variety of topics for the Toyota group and other partners.

As of June 2026, the institute's leadership constitutes of Nobuhiko Koga as the Chief Executive Officer, and Takashi Shimazu as the President and Chief Research Officer.

== Related companies ==
=== Stockholders ===
- Toyota Industries Corporation
- Toyota Motor Corporation
- Aichi Steel Corporation
- JTEKT Corporation
- Toyota Auto Body Co., Ltd
- Toyota Tsusho Corporation
- Aisin Seiki Co., Ltd
- DENSO CORPORATION
- Toyota Boshoku Corporation

=== Technical Cooperation Contracted Companies ===
- Kanto Auto Works, Ltd
- Toyoda Gosei Co., Ltd

== See also ==
- Toyota Group
