= Toyota Park (disambiguation) =

Toyota Park is the former name of a soccer-specific stadium in Bridgeview, Illinois, USA.

Toyota Park may also refer to:

- Endeavour Field, Woolooware, New South Wales, Australia (formerly known as Toyota Park)
- Toyota Prefectural Natural Park, Yamaguchi, Japan
- Toyota Athletic Stadium, Toyota, Aichi, Japan

== See also ==
- Toyota (disambiguation)
- Toyota Stadium (disambiguation)
- Toyota Center (disambiguation)
- Toyota Arena (disambiguation)
