= Global 30 Project =

The Global 30 Project—Establishing University Network for Internationalization—is a support initiative implemented by Japan's Ministry of Education, Culture, Sports, Science and Technology (MEXT), targeting national, public, and private universities in Japan.

== Overview ==
Amid an intensifying global competition for talent, the project aims to enhance the international competitiveness of Japanese universities and provide attractive educational programs. By bringing competent international students from around the world to Japan and establishing an environment where international and Japanese students can engage in friendly competition, the goal is to foster globally active human resources.

This initiative supports, through a rigorous evaluation process, the formation of internationalization hubs by selecting and adopting outstanding plans that provide high-quality education and well-structured systems for accepting international students. In the selected undergraduate and graduate schools, English-taught degree courses have been established, and the admission of foreign students began in the 2010–2012 academic years.

As of 2011, 13 national and private universities had established 90 courses at the graduate level and 16 courses at the undergraduate level. This project was part of the 300K International Students Plan, aiming to accept 300,000 international students by 2020.

To pave the way for this goal, the government selected high-quality national, public, and private universities capable of becoming internationalization centers through a competition based on their track records of accepting international students. These universities, designated as Internationalization Hub Universities, received financial support to establish Japan as a center for global talent.

When applying, universities selected undergraduate and graduate schools with international competitiveness, strong records of accepting international students, the capability to teach in English, and an adequate number of faculty members able to conduct classes in English. They presented their past achievements and the English degree programs they offer.

When selected as internationalization hubs, enhancing staffing became necessary, including recruiting faculty members from overseas. They also needed to invest significant funds to meet the requirements of providing scholarships, establishing overseas hub offices, and constructing dormitories for international students. To support these expenses, the government has provided approximately 3 billion yen (US$20 million) annually.

== Selection process ==
The selection and evaluation were conducted by the Japan Society for the Promotion of Science (JSPS), an independent administrative agency under the jurisdiction of MEXT. In 2009, the following 13 universities were selected:

- Tohoku University
- University of Tsukuba
- University of Tokyo
- Nagoya University
- Kyoto University
- Osaka University
- Kyushu University
- Keio University
- Sophia University
- Meiji University
- Waseda University
- Doshisha University
- Ritsumeikan University

The evaluations also included historical experience and performance in accepting and supervising international students, implementation of September (fall) admissions, educational and research levels of the faculties and graduate schools, and establishing overseas offices. The Japan Society for the Promotion of Science assessed these factors through documents and interviews. Of 22 universities that applied, 13 were selected.

== Project evaluation ==
In 2009, the project was targeted for budget cuts during the policy review by the Government Revitalization Unit. The 13 Internationalization Hub Universities raised concerns, but the budget for the 2010 fiscal year was reduced by 30%.

In 2010, the project was subject to a second review, and the reviewers determined it should be temporarily abolished. However, this decision sparked strong concerns from industry leaders and experts across various fields, who argued that it would undermine Japan's international competitiveness. Support for the Global 30 Project also grew, and as a result, a budget equivalent to the previous year's (30% less than the initial plan) was restored.

For example, the Japanese Business Federation (Keidanren) has shown strong interest in the Global 30 Project through questionnaires about the talent sought by industry and expectations for university education and set up the Keidanren Global Human Resource Development Scholarship for students majoring in such fields as business, economics, and law within the faculties and graduate schools in the Global 30 Project. It encourages its member companies to actively recruit those students, with the hope that this project will foster global talent.

Particularly, attracting and admitting talented international students from emerging countries who are candidates for future elite positions signifies expanding business opportunities, including future infrastructure exports. It also contributes to building intellectual and human networks with emerging countries and ties directly to Japan's survival strategy in the international community as diplomatic and security measures.

Nonetheless, Japan's public spending on universities and other higher education institutions has been the lowest among major developed nations in the Organization for Economic Co-operation and Development (OECD). Especially over the past decade, while other major countries have actively increased investment in university education and research, Japan has trended toward budget cuts.

== Role of the program ==
To attract high-quality international students at a global level, universities must be ranked within the top 500 in worldwide university rankings. However, even for world-class universities, recruiting outstanding students is not easy.

Currently, university presidents themselves are inspired by top sales strategies and engage in global recruitment battles for international students. In the spring of 2010, Harvard University President Catherine Drew Gilpin Faust visited Japan for the first time to recruit Japanese students to study abroad. There are only about 100 Japanese students across all faculties at Harvard, but the president herself visited Japan to conduct promotional activities.

In this way, world-class universities compete fiercely to acquire high-quality international students as future elite candidates. Japanese universities have also ventured into the global competition to discover and recruit outstanding international students in order to survive on a global scale.

For example, Waseda University was reported to have succeeded in securing the top student designated by the Vietnamese government for its science and engineering program in 2010 after several years of negotiations between the head of Waseda University and the Vietnamese government.

To recruit talented students abroad, renowned universities worldwide have accelerated efforts such as establishing satellite offices in emerging countries. Similarly, leading Japanese universities have worked to set up their own overseas offices, demonstrating their commitment to this goal.

In the Global 30 Project, Tohoku University, University of Tsukuba, University of Tokyo, Nagoya University, Kyushu University, Waseda University, and Ritsumeikan University are required to utilize their respective overseas offices as a comprehensive contact point for studying in Japan, referred to as Overseas University Shared Service Offices. These overseas offices are expected to serve as recruitment hubs for outstanding students from emerging regions and countries by conducting study-abroad information sessions, gathering local educational information, and fostering exchanges with local high schools. For this purpose, a nationwide support system is also required.

- Asia: Bangalore, India (operating university: University of Tokyo), New Delhi, India (Ritsumeikan University), Hanoi, Vietnam (Kyoto University)
- North Africa and the Middle East: Tunis, Tunisia (University of Tsukuba), Cairo, Egypt (Kyushu University)
- Eurasia: Moscow, Russia (Tohoku University), Tashkent, Uzbekistan (Nagoya University)
- Europe: Bonn, Germany (Waseda University)

Global competition with international universities to attract students and faculty is challenging, as prominent universities abroad have the advantage of government financial support and financial resources.

Furthermore, in recent years, there has been a rapid increase in fiscal investments in higher education and scientific and technological development among major countries and emerging Asian powers, reflecting a clear prioritization of these areas. As a result, universities in emerging countries that receive generous financial support from their governments are catching up rapidly.

Meanwhile, while governments worldwide strategically address the 21st-century knowledge-based society from a medium- to long-term perspective, Japan has adopted policies that counter these global environmental changes for over a decade.

For instance, the U.S. federal government allocated research funding of 1 billion dollars to a single private institution, Johns Hopkins University. Meanwhile, the total scientific research funding distributed to 11 research universities in Japan (Hokkaido University, Tohoku University, University of Tsukuba, University of Tokyo, Waseda University, Keio University, Tokyo Institute of Technology, Nagoya University, Kyoto University, Osaka University, and Kyushu University) amounts to only 88.1 billion yen (approximately US$600 million). That is, in the United States, the budget invested in a single institution in 2007 was twice the total government research funding for 11 Japanese research universities.

Consequently, Japan faces a challenging situation where public financial support for universities remains at the lowest level among major developed nations. Under these circumstances, the Global 30 Project is expected to boost Japanese universities significantly.

== Efforts to ensure the quality of international students ==
The Ministry of Justice and the Ministry of Education, Culture, Sports, Science and Technology have established regulations and guided admitting international students.

To prevent foreigners with employment purposes from enrolling as students, regulations based on the Immigration Control and Refugee Recognition Act prohibit residency in programs that are established as a means for workers, specifically those that are predominantly for evening classes (known as second division), thereby requiring each university to ensure thorough enrollment management. In particular, the purpose of the Global 30 Project is to build a world-class hub for accepting high-quality international students, and detailed requests have been made to prevent illegal residence and illegal employment that do not meet this goal.

Each university is obligated under the law to collaborate with the Immigration Services Agency to implement proper enrollment management. Specifically, efforts must include assigning an international student advisor, managing their attendance, providing guidance and support to long-term absentees and dropouts, monitoring part-time employment situations, and submitting regular reports to the immigration authorities.

In addition, through preliminary screening, the program determines whether the universities have international competitiveness and the potential to serve as centers for advanced education and research. It also considers their track record in hosting international students and the adequacy of faculty, including foreign faculty, with overseas teaching and research experience. Admissions for international students are limited to specific undergraduate and graduate schools that meet these high standards. This ensures the provision of substantial and attentive guidance by dedicated faculty members.

Therefore, considerable attention has been given to preventing the project from being exploited by universities with low competitiveness ratings to accept international students solely for meeting enrollment capacity, which has become a social problem and is connected to encouraging illegal employment under the guise of studying abroad.
