= G8 Climate Change Roundtable =

The G8 Climate Change Roundtable was formed in January 2005 at the World Economic Forum in Davos, Switzerland. Its purpose was to address the global climate change issue facing governments, business and civil society. The first meeting was held in Gleneagles, Scotland, from 6–8 July 2005, to coincide with the 31st G8 summit.

The roundtable was established by twenty-three leading international businesses with the assistance of G8 President and Prime Minister of the United Kingdom Tony Blair, to co-operatively engage in a global plan of action. The aim of the group was to ensure that a long-term policy framework was set up to enable consistent and transparent market-based solutions in mitigating climate change, while also addressing issues linked to climate change; such as economic growth, poverty, and adequate energy supplies. Carbon trading is one of the most popular pricing mechanisms used to the reduce greenhouse emissions worldwide.

The group devised a Framework for Action which called for technology incentive programs, the establishment of common metrics, for example in energy efficiency, and the expansion of emissions trading schemes.

Some of the companies participating include Ford, British Airways, HSBC, Électricité de France and BP. Now, the Climate Change Roundtable has a membership of 150 businesses spread across the globe.

Environmentalists raised concerns that the body's statement does not call for targets or include timetables. Friends of the Earth noted that the roundtable represented a major shift by the business community towards efforts to mitigate climate change.

== Key principles ==
The G8 Climate Change Roundtable stated 5 key points to be addressed:

- Companies must recognize their responsibility in addressing climate change.
- The issue of climate change requires further international attention and support.
- Market forces must be considered in the crafting of a solution, consumer support is needed to solve the problem.
- Specific policies for the mitigation of climate change.
- Specific policies which should be adopted by G8 members.

=== For business ===
The G8 Climate Change Roundtable developed 5 key principles for businesses to consider when crafting a climate change mitigation strategy. These principles are:

- Strategies should be based on scientific and economic facts.
- Businesses should adopt market based policy frameworks which are transparent and offer consistent price signals in the long-term.
- Solutions should be adopted globally in order to achieve long-term success.
- Climate change solutions must not be viewed in isolation from other global challenges, such as ensuring access to energy, expanding availability of clean water, alleviating poverty, and achieving economic growth in emerging markets.
- Businesses should seek a system wide solution, identifying opportunities for CO_{2} mitigation throughout the supply chain.

=== For governments ===
The G8 Climate Change Roundtable developed 3 key principles for governments to consider when addressing climate change. Governments should:

- Focus their resources on measuring the effects of climate change on human, economic and environmental health.
- Increase their understanding of current and future changes taking place within the global environment. (e.g. sea level rise, sea/ice cover).
- Quickly and effectively adopt climate stabilization policies with the goal of mitigating future environmental harm.

== Policy framework ==
The G8 Climate Change Roundtable aimed to create a long-term policy framework which was both transparent and consistent. Through market based solutions such as carbon trading, the Roundtable established a policy framework which now encompasses 150 businesses across the globe.

By creating long term value, these members established a market based framework extending to 2030 and indicative signals extending to 2050. This policy framework they hoped would take on a global scale, with consistent policies throughout the various states. The framework was meant to not only mitigate climate change but also promote sustainable development by addressing issues of poverty, energy and economic growth in emerging markets.

The Roundtable recommended encouraging technological innovation through performance based incentives. By quickly commercializing low carbon technologies they aimed to mitigate climate change quickly. They noted that by ensuring that climate change mitigation goals aligned with societal goals, governments would be able to optimize greenhouse gas reductions. By ensuring that emerging markets, such as China, India, Brazil, South Africa and Mexico, invest in low carbon economic growth, new technologies can be applied globally while streamlining emerging markets. New investments should align with societal goals, creating partnerships between G8 nations as well as emerging nations. Through such a partnership, members can effectively collaborate on specific projects within countries or rapid dissemination of specific technologies.

Members of the new policy framework should establish common metrics. By streamlining greenhouse emissions reporting processes and systems, countries can achieve this goal. Business and G8 governments should use supply chain drivers and the power of procurement to integrate climate change solutions into their global supply chain requirements. By committing to the use of the Roundtable's policy framework throughout the supply chain, optimal greenhouse gas mitigation can be achieved.

== Participating companies ==
- ABB, Fred Kindle, CEO
- Alcan, Travis Engen, President and CEO
- BP, John Browne, Group Chief Executive
- British Airways, Martin Broughton, Chairman
- BT, Ben Verwaayen, CEO
- Cinergy, James E. Rogers, chairman, President & CEO
- Cisco Systems, Robert Lloyd, President, Operations, Europe, Middle East, Africa
- Deloitte, John Connolly, CEO, UK and Global Managing Director, Deloitte, Touche Tohmatsu
- Deutsche Bank, Tessen von Heydebreck, Member of the Board of Managing Directors
- E.ON, Burckhard Bergmann, Member Executive Board of E.ON, CEO of E.ON Ruhrgas
- EADS, François Auque, Head of Space Division
- Électricité de France, Pierre Gadonneix, chairman and CEO
- Eskom, Reuel J. Khoza, Non-Executive Chairman
- Ford, William Clay Ford, chairman and CEO
- HP, Mark Hurd, President and CEO HSBC, Sir John Bond, Group Chairman
- Petrobras, Jose Eduardo de Barros Dutra, President and CEO
- RAO UESR, Anatoly B. Chubais, CEO
- Rio Tinto, Paul Skinner, Chairman
- Siemens, Klaus Kleinfeld, President and CEO
- Swiss Re, Jacques Aigrain, Deputy CEO
- Toyota, Katsuhiro Nakagawa, Vice Chairman
- Vattenfall, Lars G. Josefsson, President and CEO
- Volkswagen, Bernd Pischetsrieder, chairman of the Board of Management

== See also ==
- Conservation ethic
- Environmental protection
- Natural capital
- Natural resource
