= Fujio Cho =

Japanese businessman

Fujio Chō 張 富士夫
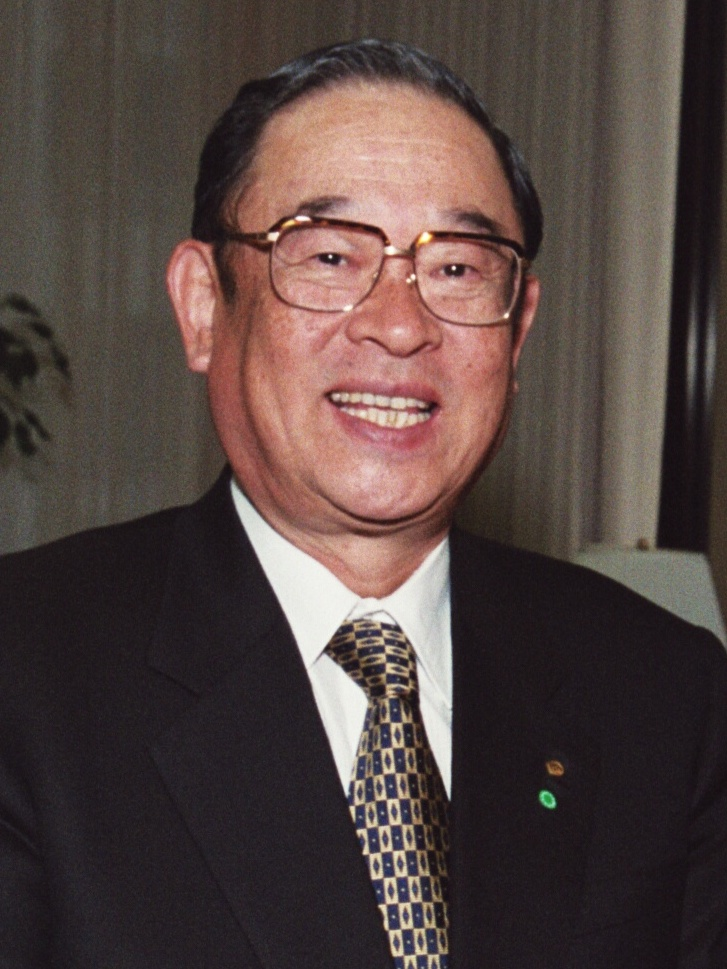
- In 2002
- Born: February 2, 1937 (age 89); Dalian, Manchukuo
- Education: University of Tokyo (bachelor's degree, 1960)
- Occupations: President of Toyota Motor Corporation (1999–2006); Chairman of Toyota Motor Corporation (2006–2013); Honorary chairman of Toyota Motor Corporation (2013–2017)

Fujio Cho (張 富士夫, Chō Fujio; born February 2, 1937) is a Japanese businessman who was formerly honorary chairman of the Toyota Motor Corporation. Chō is the only second "outsider" to head Toyota Motor Co. since the members of the founding Toyoda family stepped aside in 1995.

He earned a bachelor's degree in law from the University of Tokyo in March 1960. Chō joined the Toyota Motor Corporation in April 1960. Chō's previous titles include: managing director, senior managing director, vice president, president and vice chairman of the board. He previously worked as president in a subsidiary. Chō has been serving as chairman of the board and representative director of Toyota Motor Corporation from June 2006 to June 2013.

Chō has been a strong advocate of environmentally friendly automotive technology, such as the hybrid-electric Prius.

== Honors ==
- Medal of Honor with Blue Ribbon (November 2001)
- Officer of the Legion of Honor of France (May 2004)
- Honorary Knight Commander of the Order of the British Empire (KBE) (October 2006)
- Grand Decoration of Honor in Silver with Star of Austria (January 2009)
- Grand Cordon of the Order of the Rising Sun, 2009.
- Time magazine, 100 most influential people of 2004.

== Notes ==
Business positions
| Preceded by Hiroshi Okuda | President of Toyota; 1999-2005 | Succeeded by Katsuaki Watanabe |
| Preceded by Hiroshi Okuda | Chairman of Toyota; 2006-2013 | Succeeded by Takeshi Uchiyamada |
Non-profit organization positions
| Preceded by Yoshiro Mori | President of Japan Sport Association; 2011-2017 | Succeeded by Masatoshi Ito |
