= Katsuhiro =

- Gender: Male

Origin
- Origin: Japanese
- Meaning: Different meanings depending on the kanji used

Katsuhiro (written: 勝洋, 勝浩, 勝弘, 勝大, 克広, 克央, 克洋, 雄大 or 功宗) is a masculine Japanese given name. Notable people with the name include:

- Katsuhiro Akimoto (秋元 克広; born 1956), Japanese politician
- Gojōrō Katsuhiro (五城楼 勝洋; born 1973), Japanese sumo wrestler
- Katsuhiro Harada (原田 勝弘; born 1970), Japanese game producer
- Kotonishiki Katsuhiro (琴錦 功宗; born 1968), Japanese sumo wrestler
- Katsuhiro Kusaki (草木 克洋; born 1962), Japanese footballer
- Katsuhiro Matsumoto (松元 克央; born 1997), Japanese swimmer
- Katsuhiro Minamoto (皆本 勝弘; born 1972), Japanese footballer
- Katsuhiro Mori (森 勝洋; born 1983), Japanese Magic: The Gathering player
- Katsuhiro Nagakawa (永川 勝浩; born 1980), Japanese baseball player
- Katsuhiro Nakagawa, Japanese businessman
- Katsuhiro Nakamura (中村 勝広; 1949–2015), Japanese baseball player, coach and manager
- Katsuhiro Nakayama (中山 克広; born 1996), Japanese footballer
- Katsuhiro Otomo (大友 克洋; born 1954), Japanese manga artist, screenwriter and film director
- Katsuhiro Shiratori (白鳥 勝浩; born 1976), Japanese beach volleyball player
- Katsuhiro Suzuki (footballer) (鈴木 勝大; born 1977), Japanese footballer
- Katsuhiro Ueo (植尾 勝浩; born 1972), Japanese racing driver
