= Hiroshi Okuda =

Japanese businessman (1932–2026)

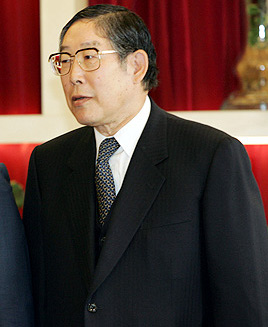
Okuda in 2005

Hiroshi Okuda (奥田 碩 Okuda Hiroshi; 29 December 1932 – 8 August 2026) was a Japanese businessman who served as president of the Toyota Motor Corporation from 1995 to 1999 and as its chairman from 1999 to 2006.

== Life and career ==
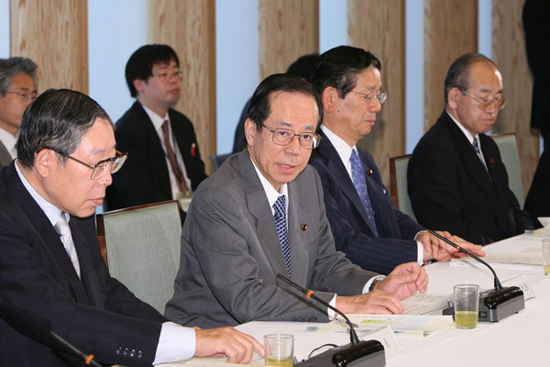
Okuda with Yasuo Fukuda at the Prime Minister's Official Residence in May 2008

Hiroshi Okuda was born in Tsu, Mie Prefecture, on 29 December 1932. He graduated from Hitotsubashi University in 1955 and began working for Toyota.

He became president of Toyota in 1995 after having worked at the corporation for 40 years. In 1998, Okuda was selected as a member of the Prime Minister's Economic Strategy Council. Okuda stepped down as president and became chairman of the board in 1998. That same year he became chairman of the Japan Federation of Employers' Associations. He also held the position of chairman of the Japan Automobile Manufacturers Association from 2000 to 2002. He stepped down as Toyota's chairman in 2006.

Okuda is credited with seeing the need for hybrid cars early and pushing Toyota towards quickly bringing them to market.

Okuda died on 8 August 2026, at the age of 93.

Business positions
Preceded by Tatsuro Toyoda	President of the Toyota Motor Corporation; 1995–1999	Succeeded by Fujio Cho
Preceded by Shoichiro Toyoda	Chairman of the Toyota Motor Corporation; 1999–2006	Succeeded by Fujio Cho
Other offices
New title	Chairman of the Japan Business Federation; 2002–2006	Succeeded by Fujio Mitarai
