= Toyota Group =

Japanese company group

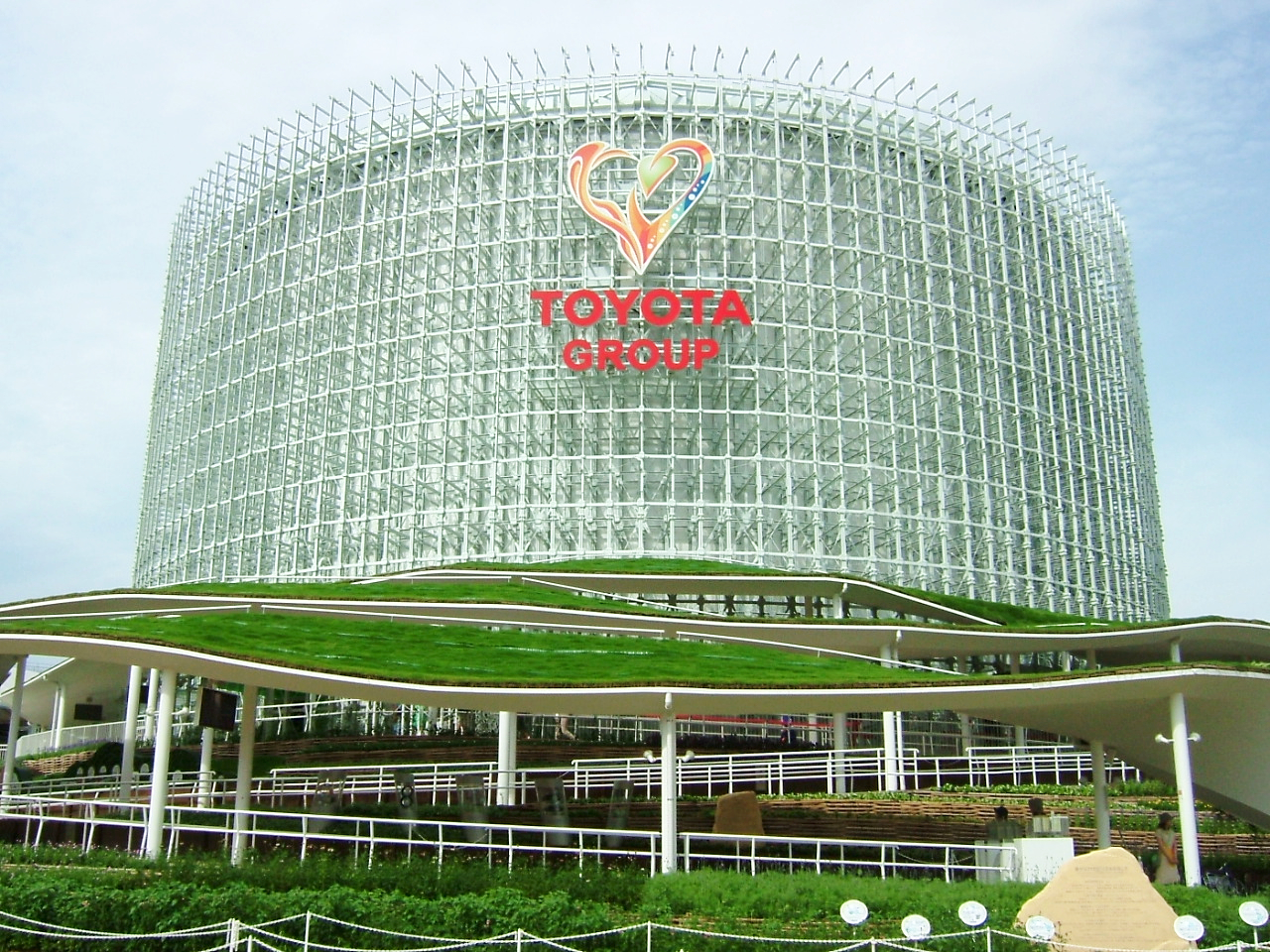
- Toyota Group Pavilion of Expo 2005
- Type: Public
- Industry: Conglomerate
- Founded: 18 November 1926; 99 years ago
- Founder: Sakichi Toyoda
- Headquarters: Toyota, Japan
- Brands: Toyota; Century; Lexus; Scion (defunct); Daihatsu; Hino
- Subsidiaries: See Major group companies

The Toyota Group (トヨタグループ, Toyota Gurūpu) is a group of companies that have supplier, vendor and investment relationships with Toyota Industries and Toyota Motor vehicle manufacturing facilities. It is similar to a keiretsu in that no particular entity has outright control over the entire group, although unlike most keiretsu it does not contain a major bank.

== Major group companies ==
There are 18 major companies that make up the Toyota Group:

Group company	Established	Products
Toyota Industries	1926	manufactures textile machinery (looms), forklifts, automotive components, and other equipment
Toyota Motor	1937	manufactures vehicles
Aichi Steel	1940	manufactures automotive steel; 30% owned by Toyota Industries and Toyota Motor
JTEKT	2006	manufactures machine tools, auto parts; formed by the merger of Koyo Seiko (1921) and Toyoda Machine Works (1941)
Toyota Auto Body	1945	manufactures vehicles, parts and auto bodies; 100% owned by Toyota Motor
Toyota Tsusho	1946	trading company (sogo shosha) supporting global operations of Toyota Group companies; 33% owned by Toyota Industries and Toyota Motor
Aisin	1949	manufactures automotive components; 30% owned by Toyota Industries and Toyota Motor
Denso	1949	manufactures automotive components; Toyota Motor owns 24.55%, Toyota Industries owns 8.74%
Toyota Boshoku	1918	original Toyota company; manufactures auto parts and textiles
Toyota Fudosan	1953	commercial real estate developer in Nagoya and Tokyo areas
Toyota Central R&D Labs	1960	performs research and development for other Toyota Group companies
Toyota Motor East Japan	2012	manufactures vehicles and parts
Toyoda Gosei	1949	manufactures automotive components; 43% owned by Toyota Motor
Daihatsu	1907	manufactures compact automobiles; 100% owned by Toyota Motor since 2016
Toyota Housing Corporation	2003	residential construction
Toyota Motor Kyushu	1991	Lexus cars, engines, and hybrid systems
Woven by Toyota	2021	vehicle software, automated driving, Woven City

== Affiliates or partially owned subsidiaries ==
- Kyoho kai group – Auto parts company – 211 companies.
- Kyouei kai group – Logistic/facility company – 123 companies.
- KDDI (Toyota owns 11.09% of the company)
- Nagoya Broadcasting Network (Toyota owns 34.6% and is the largest single shareholder in the company; 36.9% of the stock are directly and indirectly (through TV Asahi Holdings Corporation) owned by Asahi Shimbun, making it the largest corporate group shareholder)
- Subaru Corporation, manufacturer of Subaru automobiles. (Toyota owns 20% and is the largest single shareholder in the company)
- Mazda (Toyota owns 5.05% of the company)
- Suzuki (Toyota owns 4.9% of the company)
- Isuzu (Toyota owns 4.6% of the company)
- Misawa Homes Holdings, Inc. (Toyota owns 13.4% of the company)
- Primearth EV Energy Co – a joint venture between Toyota and Panasonic (1996 to present)
- Toyota Canada – a joint venture between Toyota (51%) and Mitsui & Co (49%) (1964 to present)
- Yamaha (Toyota owns 3.8% of the company)
- Panasonic (Toyota owns 2.8% of the company)
- Nippon Telegraph & Telephone (Toyota owns 2.09% of the company)
- MS&AD Insurance Group (Toyota owns 8.88% and is the largest single shareholder in the company)
- Fuji Pharma Co., Ltd.
- Archion, the combination of Fuso and Hino. (Toyota owns 25% of the company)

== Former group companies ==
- Hino – Toyota owned 50.1% from 2001 to 2026. Hino is now part of Archion.
- NUMMI – a joint venture between Toyota and General Motors (1984 to 2010).
- United Australian Automobile Industries – a joint venture between Toyota Australia and Holden (1989 to 1996).
- Tesla – Toyota owned 1.43% (2010 to 2016).
