= Shoichiro Toyoda =

Japanese businessman (1925–2023)

- 豊田 章一郞
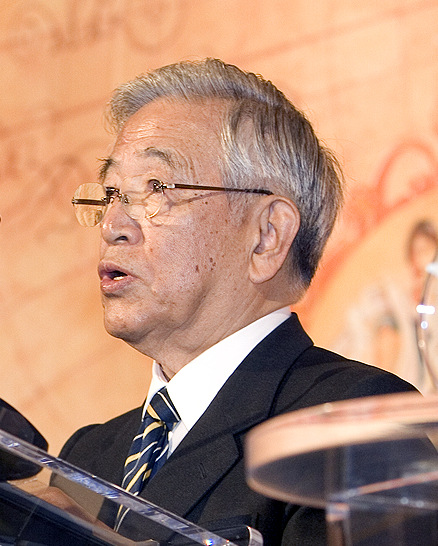
- Toyoda in 2007
- Born: 27 February 1925; Nagoya, Aichi, Japan
- Died: 14 February 2023 (aged 97)
- Education: Nagoya University (BS); Tohoku University (PhD)
- Title: Chairman of Toyota Motor Corporation (1994–1999)
- Spouse: Hiroko Mitsui
- Children: 2, including Akio
- Father: Kiichiro Toyoda
- Relatives: Sakichi Toyoda (grandfather); Rizaburo Toyoda (uncle-in-law); Eiji Toyoda (first cousin once removed); Tatsuro Toyoda (brother)

Shoichiro Toyoda (Japanese: 豊田 章一郞, Hepburn: Toyoda Shōichirō; 27 February 1925 – 14 February 2023) was a Japanese business executive who served as chairman of Toyota Motor Corporation from 1992 to 1999, as well as chairman of the influential Japan Business Federation (日本経済団体連合会, Nippon Keidanren) from 1994 to 1998. Under Toyoda's leadership, Toyota started manufacturing vehicles overseas and undertook the development of the Lexus brand. He was the grandson of the Toyoda Automatic Loom Works founder Sakichi Toyoda and the son of the Toyota Motor founder Kiichiro Toyoda.

== Early life and education ==
Shoichiro Toyoda was born in Nagoya on February 27, 1925. The eldest son and second of four children, his parents were Kiichiro Toyoda, the founder of Toyota, and Hatako Iida, daughter of Shinshichi Iida, the founder of the Takashimaya department stores corporation. He was the grandson of Sakichi Toyoda, the founder of the Toyoda Automatic Loom Works.

Toyoda graduated from Nagoya University with a degree in engineering in 1947. He avoided being drafted during World War II, because the field of engineering was considered vital to the war effort. After graduating, he worked at a fishcake-processing plant in Hokkaido, and at a house construction firm.

In 1955, Toyoda received a PhD in engineering from Tohoku University, after completing his doctoral dissertation on fuel injection.

== Career ==
In 1952, Toyoda joined Toyota Motor following the sudden death of his father. Until then, he had not planned to join the company, but did so at the urging of his uncle, Eiji Toyoda. His initial role was director of the inspection department.

In 1957, Toyoda signed off on exporting the Toyopet Crown to the United States, after taking it on a road trip himself. Lacking an engine powerful enough to drive on US highways, however, the Crown failed to win over American drivers and incurred a significant loss for the company. The experience was a turning point for Toyoda, who later wrote that he became "determined to develop a high-quality passenger car that would perform well anywhere in the world".

Toyoda was appointed managing director in 1961, the same year that Toyota introduced Total Quality Control (TQC). In his role as deputy general manager, Toyoda became a "standard-bearer" for TQC within Toyota Motor, supporting Eiji Toyoda, who served as general manager for QC promotion and went on to become president. In 1965, Toyota Motor applied for and was awarded the Deming Prize for successful implementation of Total Quality Management (TQM).

In 1967, Toyoda was promoted to senior managing director, and became executive vice president in 1972. Company highlights during this period included the launch of the Toyota Corolla in 1966, and its introduction to the US market in 1968; the Corolla became the bestselling car in the world in 1974, and went on to become the bestselling car of all time.

=== Integration of Toyota Motor Corporation ===
In 1981, Toyoda moved from Toyota Motor to become president of Toyota Motor Sales. In 1982, the two organizations merged to form Toyota Motor Corporation, with Toyoda as the new entity's president. He served as chairman from 1992 to 1999; and he became honorary chairman in 1999.

Following the merger of Toyota Motor with Toyota Motor Sales, Toyoda led a concerted effort to blend the two organizations' distinct corporate cultures, emphasizing what he called "'The Three Cs': Creativity, Challenge and Courage". Until then, their management philosophies had been compared to "oil and water"; the old Toyota Motor had prioritized "efficiency", while Toyota Motor Sales had a more "free and open" culture. In 1984, a group was formed to explore organizational reform within Toyota, which found that the company suffered from "big company disease", discouraging younger employees from proposing new ideas due to the bureaucracy which had become entrenched within the old Toyota Motor. Toyoda pushed the company to overcome its "rigidity" to encourage innovation, and in 1988, nearly all the recommendations of the study group were adopted.

Starting in 1990, Toyoda shifted gears to emphasize contributions to society, rather than corporate social responsibility. In 1992, the company updated its Basic Precepts with new Basic Principles, and also issued a document that came to be known as the Toyota Global Earth Charter. Before stepping down as president in 1992, Toyoda drove the adoption of the Toyota Development Center System, organizing the company in "clusters" that would help foster creativity and innovation.

=== International expansion ===
Under Toyoda's leadership, Toyota expanded its global footprint by manufacturing vehicles in local markets, starting with North America. In 1983, Toyoda opened discussions with General Motors to form a joint venture to take over a GM factory in California. Called NUMMI, the New United Motor Manufacturing, Inc., started producing the Toyota Corolla, as well as the Chevrolet Nova, in 1984.

Two years later, Toyota opened its first wholly owned vehicle manufacturing plant in Kentucky, and began production of the Toyota Camry in 1988. When the plant was opened, Toyoda stated that the company would "work hard to become a good citizen of Kentucky and America". The company subsequently opened plants in Cambridge, Ontario in Canada, and Burnaston in the United Kingdom. By the time Toyoda became chairman in 1992, Toyota had manufacturing plants in 22 countries.

=== New vehicle designs ===
After successfully building Toyota's reputation as a manufacturer of affordable compact cars, in 1989, the company introduced the Lexus brand of luxury automobiles to the US market, as Toyoda aimed to design a vehicle that could compete with German models. In 1991, Toyota introduced the first wide-body Camry, an example of the growing number of vehicles specifically designed for markets outside Japan.

Even after he was no longer involved in day-to-day management of the company, Toyoda remained personally interested in car design, and was an enthusiastic participant at test-drive events into his later years. Toyoda was a staunch opponent of Toyota's participation in Formula One races, publicly disagreeing with later company president Hiroshi Okuda, who nevertheless entered Toyota into the F1 in 1999 and orchestrated its purchase of the Fuji Speedway in 2000.

=== Chairman of Keidanren ===
From 1994 to 1998, Toyoda served as chairman of Keidanren, the Japanese Business Federation. Taking the helm of the powerful business lobbying organization in the aftermath of the Japanese asset price bubble, Toyoda helped to navigate tense trade relations with the US. When his younger brother Tatsuro Toyoda, the new president of Toyota Motor Corporation, was unable to join discussions with US Ambassador Walter Mondale due to illness, Shoichiro stepped in as chairman of Toyota to negotiate the voluntary purchase of more American parts to help alleviate the US trade deficit with Japan, roughly half of which was due to automobiles. Toyoda also led Keidanren in lobbying the government to reduce corporate tax rates and deregulate the economy.

== Personal life ==
Toyoda remained honorary chairman of Toyota from 1999 until his death. He died of sudden heart failure on February 14, 2023, at age 97. He was survived by his wife, daughter, and son Akio Toyoda, who served as president of Toyota Motor Corporation for 14 years and stepped down from the post in April 2023.

== Professional recognition ==
- 1980: Deming Prize, Japan
- 1993: International Fellow Royal Academy of Engineering
- 2000: FISITA Medal of the International Federation of Automotive Engineering Societies
- 2005: Society of Automotive Engineers Foundation's Manufacturing Leadership Award, United States
- 2007: Induction into the Automotive Hall of Fame, Detroit, Michigan, USA

=== National honors (Japan) ===
- November 1984: Medal of Honor (Blue Ribbon)
- April 1995: Grand Cordon of the Order of the Sacred Treasure
- April 2002: Grand Cordon of the Order of the Rising Sun
- November 2007: Grand Cordon of the Order of the Paulownia Flowers

=== Other national honors and decorations ===
- May 1986: Grand Cross of the Order of Antonio Jose de Sucre of Venezuela
- September 1990: Knight Commander of the Order of the Crown of Thailand
- April 1991: Commander of the Order of Leopold of Belgium
- December 1991: Grand Cross of the National Order of Merit of Colombia
- March 1995: Knight Commander of the Order of the British Empire (KBE), UK
- September 1995: Grand Cross of the Order of Francisco de Miranda, Venezuela (Commander: October 1988))
- March 1996: Ordem Nacional do Cruzeiro do Sul, Brazil
- February 1998: Order of Merit of the Republic of Turkey
- June 1999: Companion of the Order of Australia (AC)
- November 1999: Grand Decoration of Honour in Gold with Star for Services to the Republic of Austria
- March 2000: Commander of the Order of Isabel the Catholic, Spain
- May 2001: Commander's Cross of the Bundesverdienstkreuz, Germany.
- April 2004: Commander's Cross with Star of the Order of Merit of the Republic of Poland, Poland
- December 2004: Knight Grand Cordon of the Order of the Direkgunabhorn, First Class, Thailand
- March 2005: Grand Officer of the Légion d'honneur of France (Commander: April 1998)
- May 2005: Grand Cross of the Order of Merit of Portugal (GCM)
- August 2005: Grand Cross of the Order of Juan Mora Fernandez, Placa de Plata of Costa Rica
- September 2005: Commander of the Order of the Equatorial Star of Gabon
- October 2007: Knight Grand Cross with the Grand Collar of the Order of Merit of the Italian Republic (Grand Officer: June 1998)
- April 2010: Grand Collar of the Order of Lakandula of the Philippines

== Family tree ==
Ikichi
Tami	Sakichi	Asako
Hatako	Kiichiro	Aiko	Rizaburo
Shoichiro	Hiroko	Tatsuro
Akio
Daisuke

Ei
Heikichi	Sasuke
Eiji	Kazuko
Kanshiro	Tetsuro	Shuhei

== General and cited references ==
- Basu, Shankar (1999). Corporate Purpose: Why It Matters More Than Strategy. London: Taylor & Francis. ISBN 978-0-8153-3374-6.
- Hino, Satoshi, and Andrew Dillon (2006). Inside the Mind of Toyota: Management Principles for Enduring Growth. Productivity Press. ISBN 978-1-56327-300-1. OCLC 62127859.

Business positions
Preceded by Eiji Toyoda	President of Toyota; 1982–1992	Succeeded by Tatsuro Toyoda
Preceded by Eiji Toyoda	Chairman of Toyota; 1992–1999	Succeeded by Hiroshi Okuda
Non-profit organization positions
Preceded by Gaishi Hiraiwa	Chairman of Keidanren; 1994–1998	Succeeded by Takashi Imai
