= Rizaburo Toyoda =

Japanese entrepreneur

Rizaburo Toyoda 豊田 利三郎
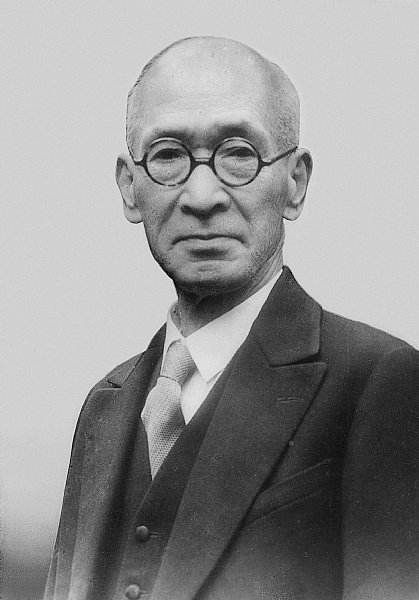
- Born: 5 March 1884
- Died: 3 June 1952 (aged 68)
- Education: Kobe University
- Title: President of Toyota Motor Corporation
- Spouse: Aiko Toyoda
- Relatives: Sakichi Toyoda (father-in-law); Kiichiro Toyoda (brother-in-law); Eiji Toyoda (cousin-in-law); Shoichiro Toyoda (nephew-in-law); Tatsuro Toyoda (nephew-in-law); Akio Toyoda (grandnephew-in-law)

Rizaburo Toyoda (豊田 利三郎, Toyoda Rizaburō; 5 March 1884 – 3 June 1952) was a Japanese entrepreneur. He was the son-in-law of Toyota Industries Co., Ltd founder Sakichi Toyoda, and brother-in-law of Toyota Motor Corporation founder, Kiichiro Toyoda (豊田 喜一郎, Toyoda Kiichirō; June 11, 1894 – March 27, 1952). His original surname was Kodama (児玉).

He graduated from Kobe University (then Kobe Koto Shogyo Gakko) and Hitotsubashi University (then Tokyo Koto Shogyo Gakko). In 1939, he became the first president of the Toyota Motor Corporation. He died at the age of 68 in 1952.

== Family tree ==
Ikichi
Tami	Sakichi	Asako
Hatako	Kiichiro	Aiko	Rizaburo
Shoichiro	Hiroko	Tatsuro
Akio
Daisuke

Ei
Heikichi	Sasuke
Eiji	Kazuko
Kanshiro	Tetsuro	Shuhei

== See also ==
- Sakichi Toyoda
- Kiichiro Toyoda
- Shoichiro Toyoda

Business positions
Preceded by -	CEO of Toyota Industries Corporation; 1926–1948	Succeeded by Taizo Ishida
Preceded by -	CEO of Toyota Motor Corporation; 1937–1941	Succeeded by Kiichiro Toyoda
