= Toyota Athletic Stadium =

Building in Toyota, Aichi Prefecture, Japan

Coordinates: 35°08′02″N 137°11′19″E

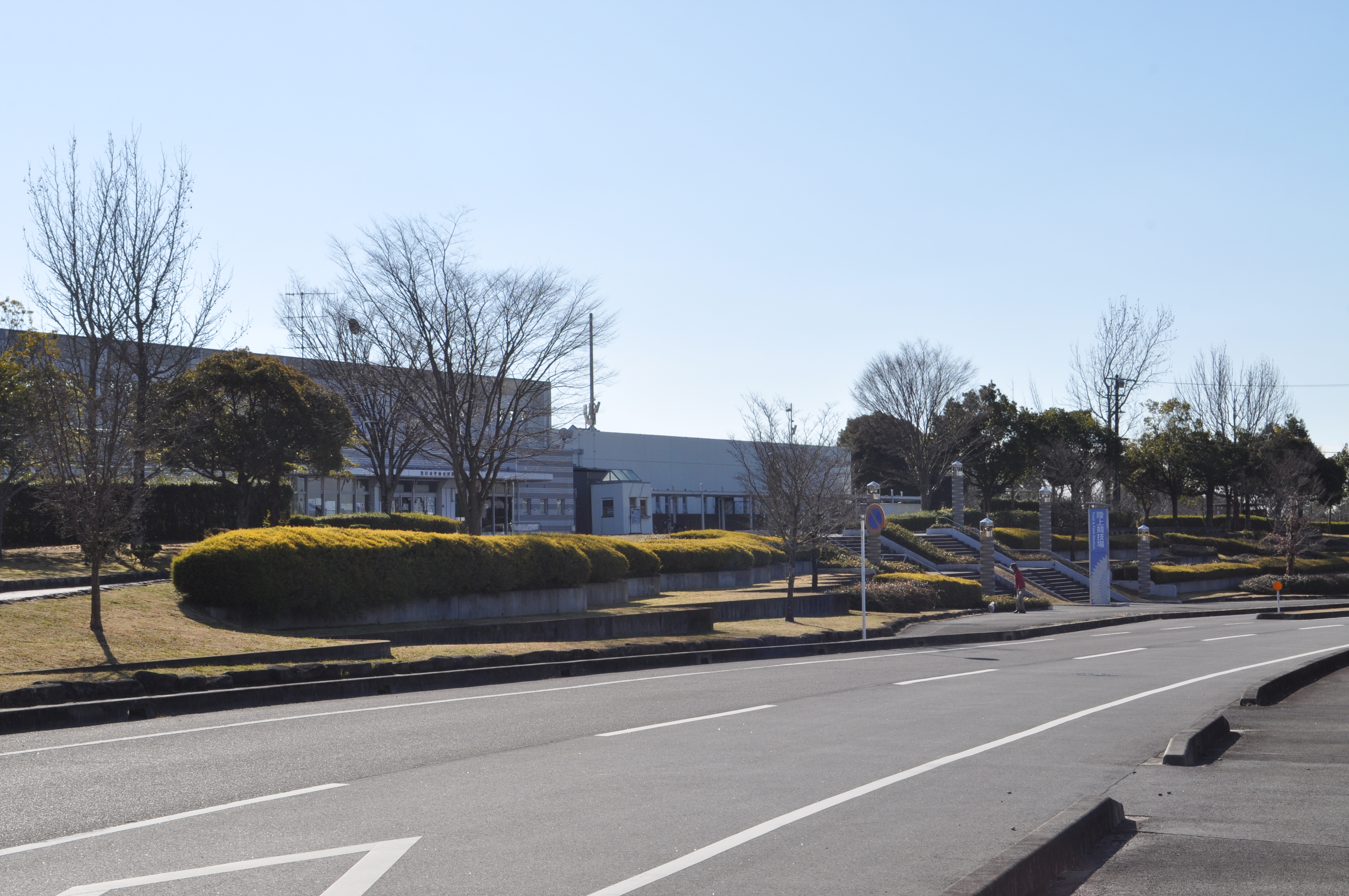
- Interactive map of Toyota Athletic Stadium
- Location: Higashiyama-cho, Toyota City 〒 470-0376 4-97, Toyota, Aichi, Japan
- Owner: Toyota City
- Operator: Toyota City Amateur Sports Association
- Capacity: 5,500
- Surface: Grass field and urethane paved track
- Field size: Infield 105m × 70m

Construction
- Opened: 1987

Toyota Athletic Stadium (豊田市運動公園, Toyota-shi Undō-kōen) is an athletic stadium in Toyota, Aichi, Japan.

The 5000 seat (10,052 m²) all weather sports stadium features an eight lane 800 metres track for track and natural grass field for soccer or rugby events.

The park has numerous other sports venues:

- softball, slow-pitch and baseball fields
- archery field
- 200 seat indoor gymnasium
- soccer and rugby field

== See also ==
- List of sports venues with the name Toyota
