= Kiichiro Toyoda =

Japanese businessman (1894–1952)

- 豊田 喜一郎
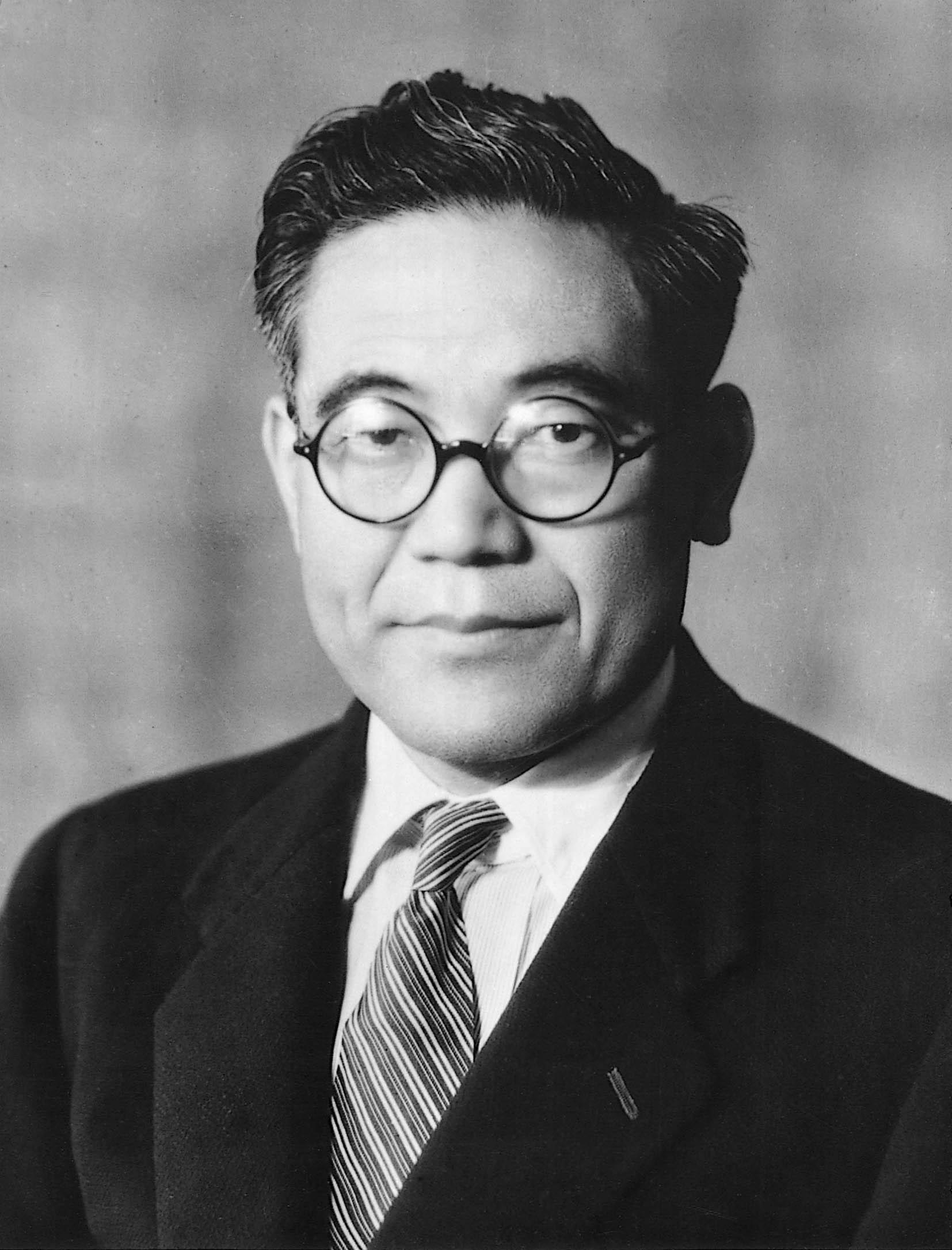
- Born: 11 June 1894; Kosai, Shizuoka, Japan
- Died: 27 March 1952 (aged 57); Toyota, Aichi, Japan
- Education: Tokyo Imperial University
- Title: Founder and CEO of Toyota
- Spouse: Hatako Iida (m. 1922)
- Children: 4, including Shoichiro and Tatsuro
- Father: Sakichi Toyoda
- Relatives: Rizaburo Toyoda (brother-in-law); Eiji Toyoda (cousin); Akio Toyoda (grandson)

Kiichiro Toyoda (Japanese: 豊田 喜一郎(とよだ きいちろう), Hepburn: Toyoda Kiichirō; 11 June 1894 – 27 March 1952) was a Japanese engineer and businessman, and the son of Toyoda Loom Works founder Sakichi Toyoda. His decision to change Toyoda's focus from automatic loom manufacturing into automobile manufacturing created what later became Toyota.

== Toyoda Loom Works and Toyota Motor Corporation ==
Kiichiro Toyoda persuaded his father, who was responsible as head of the family business, to invest in the expansion of Toyoda Loom Works into a concept automobiles division, which was considered a risk to the family business at the time. Shortly before Sakichi Toyoda died, he encouraged his son to follow his dream and pursue automobile manufacturing. Kiichiro built on his family's engineering prowess: they invented steam, oil, and electric looms. Eventually turning it into Toyota – the well known car manufacturer. He changed the company's name from his family's name for good luck.

In response to the company's flagging sales and profitability, Toyoda resigned from his position of leadership in 1950. He died two years later, without witnessing the company's eventual successes. His contemporaries later dubbed him "Japan's Thomas Edison". In 1957, his cousin and confidant Eiji Toyoda, followed him as head of Toyota Motor Corporation and built upon the late Toyoda's expansion to turn Toyota into a world-class engineering conglomeration. He also launched Lexus - the luxury car division.

== Early life ==
=== Childhood ===
Kiichiro Toyoda was born on June 11, 1894, in Yamaguchi in the village of Yoshitsu in Shizuoka Prefecture, Japan (currently Yamaguchi, Kosai, Shizuoka), the son of Sakichi Toyoda and Tami Sahara.

When Kiichiro was born, Sakichi was living in Toyohashi. Sakichi came to Yoshitsumachi to name Kiichiro. However, after Sakichi named Kiichiro, he returned to Toyohashi. Less than two months after his mother, Tami, gave birth to him, she left him and her husband. She did so because she thought her husband was too preoccupied with industrial inventions to pay any attention to their family life. Therefore, Kiichiro was raised in Yoshitsu village by his grandparents. At the age of three, Kiichiro moved to what is now Higashi-ku, Nagoya, Aichi Prefecture, where his father lived. Kiichiro entered Kyodo Kanji Ordinary Elementary School and then changed to Takadake Ordinary Elementary School (currently Nagoya Municipal Higashisakura Elementary School). After that, he entered Aichi Normal School Elementary School (currently Aichi University of Education Nagoya Elementary School), Meirin Junior High School (currently Aichi Prefectural Meiwa High School), and Second High School. In 1920, he graduated from the Department of Mechanical Engineering, Faculty of Engineering, at Tokyo Imperial University. After graduation, he remained in Tokyo Imperial University at the Faculty of Law for about seven months until March 1921. Kiichiro excelled at his studies.

=== After graduating university ===
After graduating, Toyoda returned to his hometown, Nagoya, and joined Toyota Boshoku, which was founded by his father, Sakichi, in 1918 (Sakichi served as company president from then on). From July 1921 to February 1922, Kiichirō visited San Francisco, London, Oldham (a large town in Greater Manchester, England), etc. to learn about the spinning and weaving industry and then returned from Marseille via Shanghai. After he returned to Japan, in December 1922, he married Hatako Iida, the daughter of the Takashimaya department store chain co-founder, Shinshichi Iida. In 1926, Kiichiro established Toyota Industries Corporation and became its managing director. Also, he became interested in automatic looms, so he set up a pilot plant in Kariya, Aichi to start development for them even though his father, Sakichi, disagreed. He traveled to Europe and America from September 1929 to April 1930, and thought that the automobile industry, which was in its infancy at that time, would greatly develop in the future. Therefore, in 1933, an automobile manufacturing department (later the automobile department) was newly established in Toyota Industries Corporation. In 1936, it was designated as a licensed company under the Automotive Manufacturing Act. In 1937, it became independent as Toyota Motor Corporation. Kiichirō became the vice president the same year (the president was Rizaburo Toyoda). In 1941, Kiichiro took over as president. At the height of World War II, the Toyoda family was affected on both family business and home fronts. His children's education was delayed by civil ramifications, and his business was compelled to manufacture trucks for the Imperial Japanese Army. The family firms were escaped destruction during the war.

== Expanding to automotive industry ==
Kiichiro Toyoda was a key figure in leading the Japanese automobile industry, and without him, today's Japanese automobile industry might have been less developed. The automobile industry plays a very important role in supporting the Japanese economy. The number of automobiles produced in Japan dramatically increased from 70,000 to 11.4 million between 1955 and 1980, and in 1980 exceeded the number of automobiles produced by the United States. In addition, the ratio of overseas exports of Japanese automobiles was 55% in 1985.

Toyoda is said to have paved the way for the Japanese automobile industry, and he is credited for creating from scratch domestic cars that were superior to foreign cars. The differences between Japan and the United States in the automobile industry during World War II were quite large. In the early 1930s, Kiichiro proceeded with the development of the domestic production of automobiles. In 1933, Toyota Industries Corporation set up an automobile department and began full-scale development of automobiles. However, the development of the car did not proceed smoothly. For instance, no one had experience in automobile manufacturing, so he gathered those who had experience in automobile manufacturing from across Japan. Also, it took six months to manufacture the engine. Then, in May 1935, the first A1 passenger car was finally completed. After that, it produced AA passenger cars that improved upon the A1 model and GA trucks that improved the G1 model.

Toyota Industries Corporation was designated, along with the Nissan Motor Company in September as a licensed company under the Automotive Manufacturing Act. However, Kiichiro was worried that being selected as a licensed company would lead to the loss of the competitiveness and destruction of the automobile industry. In 1937, Toyota Motor Corporation was established and Kiichiro was elected as vice president. Kiichiro's management was very good for mainly two reasons. First, He controlled and made the operation simpler to produce more cars on a shoestring. Specifically, to clarify the internal organization, the company was divided into seven divisions, and the purpose and jurisdiction of each division was clear. Second, he reduced the risk of manulfacturing mass-produced cars by also manufacturing specialty cars. In November 1938, the Koromo Factory was established, to manufacture automobiles. Automobile quality and cost issues arose, and the management was put into a critical situation. Kiichiro solved those problems by taking prompt action and bringing in-house manufacturing of automobile parts. In 1941, Kiichiro became president of Toyota Motor Industry.

== Toyota Motor Corporation and war ==
=== Wartime ===
==== During Sino-Japanese War ====
Toyota Motor Corporation had restricted its activities due to the war. In 1937, the second Sino-Japanese War broke out and it caused great challenges to the Japanese automobile industry including Toyota Motor Corporation. Following the end of the war, the Japanese government restricted automobile production and stopped small car production in favor of products for the military, making the production and purchase of passenger cars difficult. In 1938, the National General Mobilization Law was enacted to maximize the use of human and physical resources. This law required Toyota Motor Corporation to prioritize building trucks for the military and munitions industries.

Starting in 1939, automobile industries had to obtain permission from the Minister of Commerce and Industry to sell passenger cars. Government control tightened in 1940 when Toyota and Nissan could only sell trucks and buses directly to individuals instead of the normal channels. The sales process was very long and cumbersome including:

- Authorization from local police
- Get a survey from the dealer
- Application for a vehicle dispatch from the manufacturer

This has resulted in very few actual orders.

==== During World War II ====
This situation became worse after the entry into World War II. Toyota Motor Corporation was designated as a munitions company in 1944, and strict control continued. Kiichiro must have been disappointed that he could not manufacture passenger cars. However, even during this time, Kiichiro concentrated on thinking about technical problems. He believed that the automobile business would definitely serve post-war Japan and continued to explore the technical issues despite such difficult times.

=== Postwar ===
==== Under occupation and Kiichiro's actions ====
Japan accepted the Potsdam Declaration on August 14, 1945, which brought the war to an end on the following day, August 15th in Japan. Postwar Japan was occupied by GHQ (General Headquarters). In terms of the automobile industry, GHQ did not allow a Japanese automobile company to make passenger cars – only trucks. Despite the difficulties, Kiichiro continued to push forward. He took a leadership role and acted to restart the Japanese automotive industry. First, in November 1945, he established an umbrella organization for the automotive industry (自動車統括団体) and he became the chairman of the organization. In the following year, he negotiated with GHQ himself, and made GHQ admit that the new situation was different from that of wartime. Kiichiro also invited representatives of distribution companies nationwide to Koromo. He gave speeches about policy changes at Toyota Motor Corporation and proceeded with talks for the recovery of the automobile industry. His forceful speeches impressed the representatives. These actions showed how much he was passionate about the automobile industry. After the war, many companies' dealers were released from control and became independent. Some of these dealers' companies restarted as Toyota dealerships and were able to support the company. This shows how much Kiichiro was trusted as the president of Toyota Motor Corporation by the owners of the dealerships. In fact, Kiichiro valued relationship with dealerships, so he usually communicated with people directly and dealt with problems as soon as possible.

==== Challenging post war situation ====
However, producing and selling cars was still difficult. Raw materials and parts were not immediately available in the difficult period after the war, and it was harder to obtain cheap and high-quality genuine parts than before. The production of trucks did not reach the monthly production goal of 500 cars. In 1945, the annual production volume was 3275 units, and in the following year, 5821 units. Although the production of passenger cars was prohibited, research for passenger cars was allowed by the GHQ. Also, as a part of the occupation policy, the automobile company was contracted to repair United States military vehicles in Japan, which was a good opportunity for Toyota employees, including Kiichiro, to learn more about the engineering of American cars. They analyzed the advanced components of American cars to improve the development of their own passenger car. Kiichiro kept working hard to develop the Japanese automobile industry, even under the adverse circumstances of the postwar period.

==== Passenger car production resumes ====
In June 1947, GHQ approved the production of up to 300 passenger cars under 1500 cc per year. From that day on, Kiichiro started to work on passenger car production. In October 1947, the first Japanese passenger car after the war, the SA model with an S engine, was released and nicknamed "Toyopet." However, there were two mail problems during this period. First, these passenger cars did not sell well. This car was highly regarded in the automobile industry but not many people bought cars for leisure driving. Therefore, only 197 cars were sold over five years since it released, compared to 12,796 trucks sold over the same period. The second problem was that the production facilities were not good. There were many machines that had been used for many years and were not well maintained,. Kiichiro was worried that theToyota Motor Corporation cars could compete with foreign cars. Moreover, since there was a possiblility that Toyota Motor Company couldn't manufacture a car that would be better and cheaper than foreign cars in a few years and that Japanese people would be willing to buy, Kiichiro was thinking about working with a foreign car manufacturer. It is clear that Kiichiro aimed to build high quality, affordable passenger cars for Japanese people and improve their happiness.

=== Dodge Line recession ===
==== Causes and influences ====
Inflation broke out in Japan because the Japanese government spent a great deal of money to support returning soldiers and withdrawals from overseas citizens which increased the money supply. This resulted in a recession caused by the 1949 Dodge Line economic stabilization plan. This included setting and exchange rate of 360 yen per dollar. Toyota Motor Corporation found it difficult to collect sales proceeds due to the effects of inflation control and the setting of a single exchange rate. The recession also reduced the demand for cars. In addition, the price of raw materials rose, and cash flow deteriorated considerably. Company management deteriorated to the point that Kiichiro and other executives personally went out to increase sales and collect accounts receivable. Furthermore, he tried to cut costs of materials, but there was still a deficit of 22 million yen every month. Due to the Dodge Line recession, over 8000 companies went bankrupt during the year of 1949.

==== Avoiding dismissal of employees ====
In August 1949, the company finally proposed to cut 10% of wages and cut retirement pay in half. As a result, the company promised not to dismiss employees, instead of accepting a 10% wage reduction. Under this circumstance, the other car companies laid down their workforce. For example, at Nihon Denso (currently Denso), which was established in December 1949, a labor dispute arose over personnel rearrangement. On March 31, 1950, four months after its establishment, Nihon Denso announced a company restructuring plan that included personnel reduction of 473 people. Under such situation, the reason why Kiichiro did not perform personnel reduction was that he experienced the employment problem at Toyota Industries Corporation during the Showa Depression in 1930, so decided that such a situation would never occur again. Moreover, the advance into the automobile business was also a measure to prevent the recurrence of employment problems due to business diversification. Therefore, He absolutely tried to avoid personnel reduction. Kiichiro visited the banks in the city every day to get finance account. After all, no financial institution provided the funds for company. However, Shotaro Kamiya, who was a managing director of sales, persistently requested the financing provision from Sogo Takanashi who was a branch manager of the Bank of Japan, Nagoya Branch. After that, finally, the syndicate consisting of 24 banks was established through the placement of the Bank of Japan. Toyota Motor Company could get 188.2 million yen in loans, subject to Toyota's reconstruction plan formulation. In this way, Kiichiro overcame the bankruptcy crisis of 1949.

=== Labor dispute ===
Despite the strong promotion of management rationalization measures, the company's business performance never recovered. The reason is, on October 25, 1949, GHQ issued a "Memorandum on the total removal of restrictions on the production and sale of automobiles". As a result, the production and sale of automobiles became free in principle, but about the supply of production materials, the allocation and distribution system by the Ministry of International Trade and Industry remained, and the prices of materials and automobiles remained regulated. Moreover, while the controlled prices of materials were gradually raised thereafter, while the controlled prices of automobiles remained unchanged until April 1950, the profitability of the automobile business remained extremely difficult. Not only Toyota Motor Corporation but also Nissan and Isuzu deteriorated in business performance. For the four and a half months from November 16, 1949, to March 31, 1950, the loss was 76.52 million yen, so Toyota Labor Union judged that the personnel cut was inevitable, and a quasi-fighting system was established in March of the same year. Since then, labor-management negotiations have intensified into long-standing disputes. Under such tension, Kiichiro, who was originally hypertensive, became ill, so negotiations with the labor union were handled by the management army instead of Kiichiro. However, on April 22, 1950, the company announced that it would carry out 1,600 voluntary retirements to the labor union. On the other hand, since the company had promised not to lay off its personnel, the union naturally became furious and continued with extreme strikes. The strikes continued daily for about two months after the declaration, which caused production in April and May to drop 70% from its previous average. Since the company would be destroyed as it was, on June 5, 1950, Kiichiro announced that he would resign as the president to take on this series of responsibilities. By his retirement, the strike ended finally. Everyone was shocked by Kiichiro's resignation, and the union also had a respect for Kiichiro.

== Retirement and death ==
After retiring from the role of president, he created a laboratory at his home in Okamoto, Setagaya, Tokyo, and worked every day to design a small helicopter. On March 27, 1952, Toyoda died at the age of 57 after suffering a fall. It was thought the fall resulted from a cerebral hemorrhage caused by chronic disease.

== Family tree ==
Ikichi
Tami | Sakichi | Asako
Hatako | Kiichiro | Aiko | Rizaburo
Shoichiro | Hiroko | Tatsuro
Akio
Daisuke

Ei
Heikichi | Sasuke
Eiji | Kazuko
Kanshiro | Tetsuro | Shuhei

Business positions
| Preceded by Rizaburo Toyoda | CEO of Toyota; 1941–1950 | Succeeded by Taizo Ishida |
