= Toyota Center (disambiguation) =

Toyota Center is an indoor arena in Houston, Texas that is home to the NBA team Houston Rockets.

Toyota Center may also refer to:

- Toyota Center (Kennewick) in Kennewick, Washington
- Findlay Toyota Center in Prescott Valley, Arizona
- Town Toyota Center in Wenatchee, Washington is home to the Wenatchee Wild
- Toyota Sports Center in El Segundo, California

== See also ==
- Toyota (disambiguation)
- Toyota Stadium (disambiguation)
- Toyota Park (disambiguation)
- Toyota Arena (disambiguation)
