= Taizo Ishida =

Japanese businessman (1888–1979)

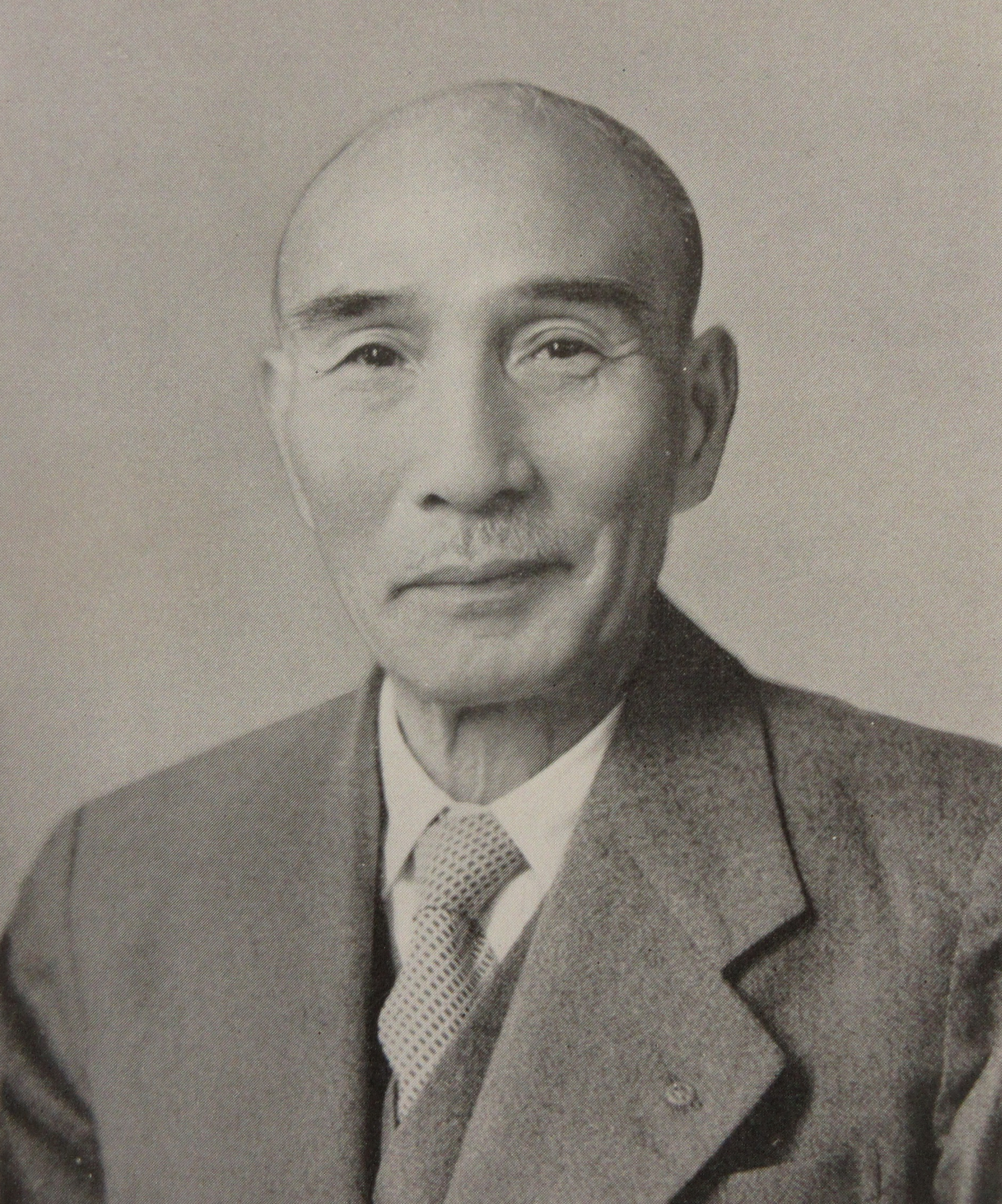
Portrait of Taizo Ishida

Taizo Ishida (16 November 1888 - 19 September 1979) was a Japanese businessman. He was the president, chairman, and advisor of Toyota Industries Corporation and Toyota Motor Corporation. He was called "The Great Banto of Toyota", a Japanese title given to the highest of the merchants for his services in rebuilding Toyota as a successful car making business. He is succeeded as president of Toyota Motors Co by Fukio Nakagawa.

== See also ==
- Kiichiro Toyoda
- Eiji Toyoda
