= Toyota Stadium =

There are multiple stadiums sponsored by Toyota that are named Toyota Stadium.

Toyota Stadium may refer to:

- Toyota Stadium (Kentucky), home stadium of Georgetown College, United States
- Toyota Stadium (Japan), an open-roof association football stadium in Toyota, Japan
- Toyota Stadium (South Africa), rugby stadium in Bloemfontein, South Africa
- Toyota Stadium (Texas), home stadium of FC Dallas of Major League Soccer in Frisco, Texas, United States
- Toyota Stadium (Australia), now Ocean Protect Stadium, the home stadium of the Cronulla-Sutherland Sharks of the National Rugby League in Australia
- Toyota Stadium (Missouri), now West Community Stadium, home stadium of Saint Louis FC of the United Soccer League Championship (2015–2020)

== See also ==
- Toyota Field, home stadium of San Antonio FC of the United Soccer League, United States
- Toyota Field (Alabama), home stadium of the Rocket City Trash Pandas, a Minor League Baseball team in the Southern League
- Toyota Center (disambiguation)
- Toyota Park (disambiguation)
- Toyota Arena (disambiguation)
- Toyota (disambiguation)
