= Toyota Arena (disambiguation) =

Toyota Arena is an arena in Ontario, California.

Toyota Arena may also refer to:

- Toyota Arena Tokyo, an arena in Japan
- Stadion Letná, a stadium in Prague, Czech Republic, known as Toyota Arena from 2003–2007
- Utz Arena, an arena in York, Pennsylvania, United States, known as Toyota Arena from 2003–2013

== See also ==
- Toyota (disambiguation)
- Toyota Center (disambiguation)
- Toyota Park (disambiguation)
- Toyota Stadium (disambiguation)
