= Japan Business Federation =

Economic organization founded in May 2002

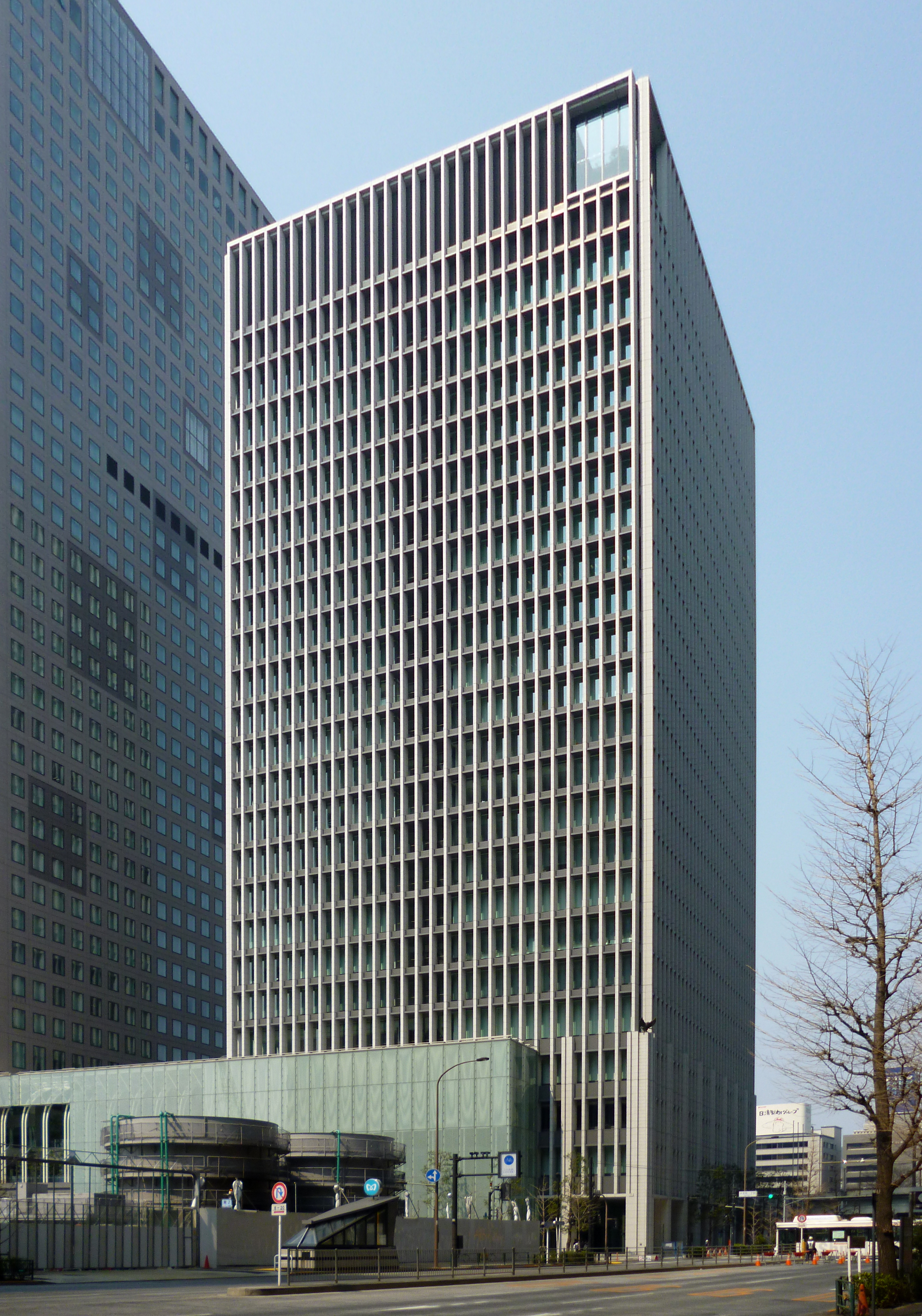
- Keidanren Kaikan, the head office of Japan Business Federation
- Formation: May 2002
- Type: Economic organization
- Legal status: Organization
- Purpose: Promote the development of the Japanese economy
- Headquarters: Tokyo
- Coordinates: 35°41′19.2″N 139°45′48.6″E
- Region served: Japan
- Official language: Japanese
- Chairman: Yoshinobu Tsutsui
- Website: www.keidanren.or.jp/en/
- Formerly called: Keidanren, Japan Federation of Employers' Associations

The Japan Business Federation (日本経済団体連合会, Nippon Keizai-dantai Rengōkai) is an economic organization founded in May 2002 by amalgamation of Keidanren (経済団体連合会, Japan Federation of Economic Organizations, established 1946; name sometimes used alone as abbreviation for whole organization) and Nikkeiren (日本経営者団体連盟, Japan Federation of Employers' Associations, established 1948), with Nikkeiren being absorbed into Keidanren.

The federation is commonly referred to as "Keidanren". Its 1,601 members consist of 1,281 companies, 129 industrial associations, and 47 regional economic organizations (as of June 15, 2010).

For most of the post-war period, Keidanren has been the voice of big business in Japan and is generally considered the most conservative of the country's three major private sector business associations. The other two organizations are the Japan Chamber of Commerce and Industry (日本商工会議所) and the Japan Association of Corporate Executives (経済同友会).

According to the organization's official website, the mission of the Keidanren is to accelerate growth of Japan's and the world's economy, and to strengthen the corporations to create additional value to transform the Japanese economy into one that is sustainable and driven by the private sector by encouraging the ideas of individuals and local communities.

The current chairman is Yoshinobu Tsutsui of Nippon Life. He has been chairman since May 2025.

== Views ==
=== View on consumption tax ===
Keidanren supported the Noda government's efforts to raise Japan's consumption tax from 5% to 10%. It had previously called for the consumption tax to be raised even higher, to 15%.

=== Views on nuclear power ===
After the March 11 nuclear disaster and subsequent shutdown of all the nuclear plants in Japan, Keidanren called for their restart. This view was not shared by all business leaders, with Rakuten president Hiroshi Mikitani leaving the federation partly over this issue. Masayoshi Son of Softbank publicly objected to the focus on restarting the nuclear plants, but didn't leave the federation over it.

=== Political donations for the LDP ===
The Keidanren regularly conducts political donations to the dominant Liberal Democratic Party (LDP). The Democratic Party of Japan (DPJ) pledged to ban corporate and organizational political donations during the 2009 general election to address public concerns over legislative influence. Following their victory, Keidanren initially suspended its donation programs. However, the DPJ failed to codify a total ban due to internal funding scandals and the continued use of legal loopholes. While direct giving to individuals was prohibited, organizations utilized political party branches to route funds to lawmakers.

The failure to enact these reforms, coupled with the government's response to the 2011 Tōhoku earthquake and tsunami, caused a significant decline in public support. In the 2012 general election, the DPJ suffered a massive defeat, losing over three-quarters of its seats. The LDP subsequently returned to power and maintained the existing donation system. Despite 2024 legislative updates that lowered disclosure thresholds for fundraising events, corporate contributions remain legal in Japanese politics.

== Changes to board composition ==
In 2002, when Keidanren took on its current form, two-thirds of its 18 vice-chairmen were from manufacturing companies. As of July 2012, only 8 of the 18 are filled by executives of manufacturers.

== Current board ==
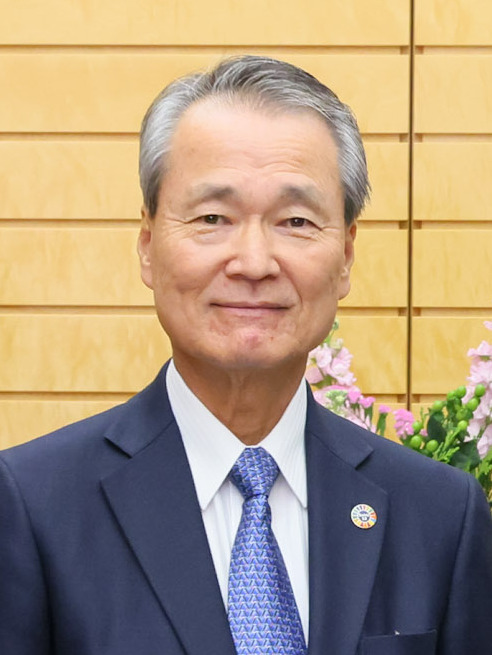
Keidanren Chairman Yoshinobu Tsutsui in 2025

Chairman and vice-chairmen as of 1 July 2026.

Title	Name	Affiliation
Chairman	Yoshinobu Tsutsui	Executive Advisor, Nippon Life Insurance Company
Vice-Chair	Jun Sawada	Executive Chairman, NTT, Inc.
Vice-Chair	Takehiko Kakiuchi	Chairman of the Board, Mitsubishi Corporation
Vice-Chair	Seiji Izumisawa	Chairman of the Board, Mitsubishi Heavy Industries
Vice-Chair	Yumiko Noda	Chairman & Representative Director, Veolia Japan
Vice-Chair	Hironori Kamezawa	President & Group CEO, Mitsubishi UFJ Financial Group
Vice-Chair	Hitoshi Nagasawa	Chairman, Director, Nippon Yusen Kabushiki Kaisha
Vice-Chair	Makoto Takashima	Chairman of the Board, Sumitomo Mitsui Financial Group
Vice-Chair	Masayuki Hyodo	Chairman of the Board, Sumitomo Corporation
Vice-Chair	Kenichiro Yoshida	Director & Executive Chairman, Sony Group Corporation
Vice-Chair	Hiroyuki Ogawa	Chairman of the Board, Komatsu Limited
Vice-Chair	Takahito Tokita	Representative Director, CEO, Fujitsu
Vice-Chair	Masahiro Kihara	President & CEO, Mizuho Financial Group
Vice-Chair	Koji Sato	Vice Chairman, Chief Industry Officer, Toyota Motor Corporation
Vice-Chair	Yuji Fukasawa	Chairman, East Japan Railway Company
Vice-Chair	Keiichi Iwata	Chairman of the Board, Sumitomo Chemical
Vice-Chair	Kei Uruma	President & CEO, Mitsubishi Electric Corporation
Vice-Chair	Satoru Komiya	Chairman of the Board, Tokio Marine
Vice-Chair	Kentaro Okuda	President & Group CEO, Nomura Holdings
Vice-Chair	Reiko Akiike	Managing Director & Senior Partner, Tokyo, Boston Consulting Group
Vice-Chair	Masakazu Kubota	President & Director General, Keidanren

=== Past officeholders ===
Japan Business Federation
Order	Past president	Affiliation	Tenure
1	Hiroshi Okuda	Toyota	May 2002 – May 2006
2	Mitarai Fujio	Canon	May 2006 – May 2010
3	Hiromasa Yonekura	Sumitomo Chemical	May 2010 – May 2014
4	Sadayuki Sakakibara	Toray Industries	June 2014 – May 2018
5	Hiroaki Nakanishi	Hitachi	May 2018 – June 2021
6	Masakazu Tokura	Sumitomo Chemical	June 2021 – May 2025
7	Yoshinobu Tsutsui	Nippon Life	May 2025–present

Old Business Federation
Order	Past chairman	Affiliation	Tenure
1	Ichiro Ishikawa	Nissan Chemical Industries	March 1948 – February 1956
2	Taizo Ishizaka	Tokyo Shibaura Electric	February 1956 – May 1968
3	Kōgorō Uemura	Keidanren Secretariat	May 1968 – May 1974
4	Toshiwo Doko	Tokyo Shibaura Electric	May 1974 – May 1980
5	Yoshihiro Inayama	Nippon Steel	May 1980 – May 1986
6	Eishiro Saito	Nippon Steel	May 1986 – December 1990
7	Gaishi Hiraiwa	Tokyo Electric Power	December 1990 – May 1994
8	Shoichiro Toyoda	Toyota	May 1994 – May 1998
9	Takashi Imai	Nippon Steel	May 1998 – May 2002

Former Japan Federation of Employers' Associations
Order	Past president (permanent typical secretary)	Affiliation	Tenure
1	Kanichi Moroi	Taiheiyo Cement	March 1948 – April 1968
2	Takashi Miki	Yawata Iron & Steel Co., Ltd.	April 1949 – April 1952
3	Masato Kato	Daiwabo Co., Ltd.	April 1949 – August 1963
4	Takeshi Sakurada	Nisshinbo Industries	April 1960 – May 1979
5	Bunpei Otsuki	Mitsubishi Mining & Cement Co., Ltd.	May 1979 – May 1987
6	Eiji Suzuki	Mitsubishi Chemical Corporation	May 1987 – May 1991
7	Ken Nagano	Mitsubishi Materials	May 1991 – May 1995
8	Jiro Nemoto	NYK	May 1995 – May 1999
9	Hiroshi Okuda	Toyota	May 1999 – May 2002

== See also ==
- Chamber of commerce
- List of employer associations
- Union of Industrial and Employers' Confederations of Europe (UNICE), a similar European business association
