= Katsuhiro Nakagawa =

Japanese businessman (1942–2016)

Katsuhiro Nakagawa (中川 勝弘, Nakagawa Katsuhiro; March 11, 1942 – July 8, 2016) is the former vice chairman of Toyota Motor Corporation. Vice-Minister for International Affairs, Ministry of Economy, Trade and Industry in 1997–1998. Former president and CEO Katsuaki Watanabe replaced him as the new vice chairman of the company and Watanabe's spot being replaced by Akio Toyoda.

Other corporate position held by Nakagawa:

- Chairman of Tokio Marine Capital Co., Ltd
- Auditor of Shochiku Co., Ltd. (2001–2014)
- Corporate Auditor of Aichi Steel Corp. (2006–present)
- President and Director of MX Mobiling Co., Ltd. (2008–?)
- Director of Mikuni Corporation (2013–present)

Business positions
Preceded by	Vice Chairman of Toyota; 2001–2009	Succeeded by Katsuaki Watanabe
