= Aichi Steel =

Japanese steel manufacturer

Aichi Steel Corporation

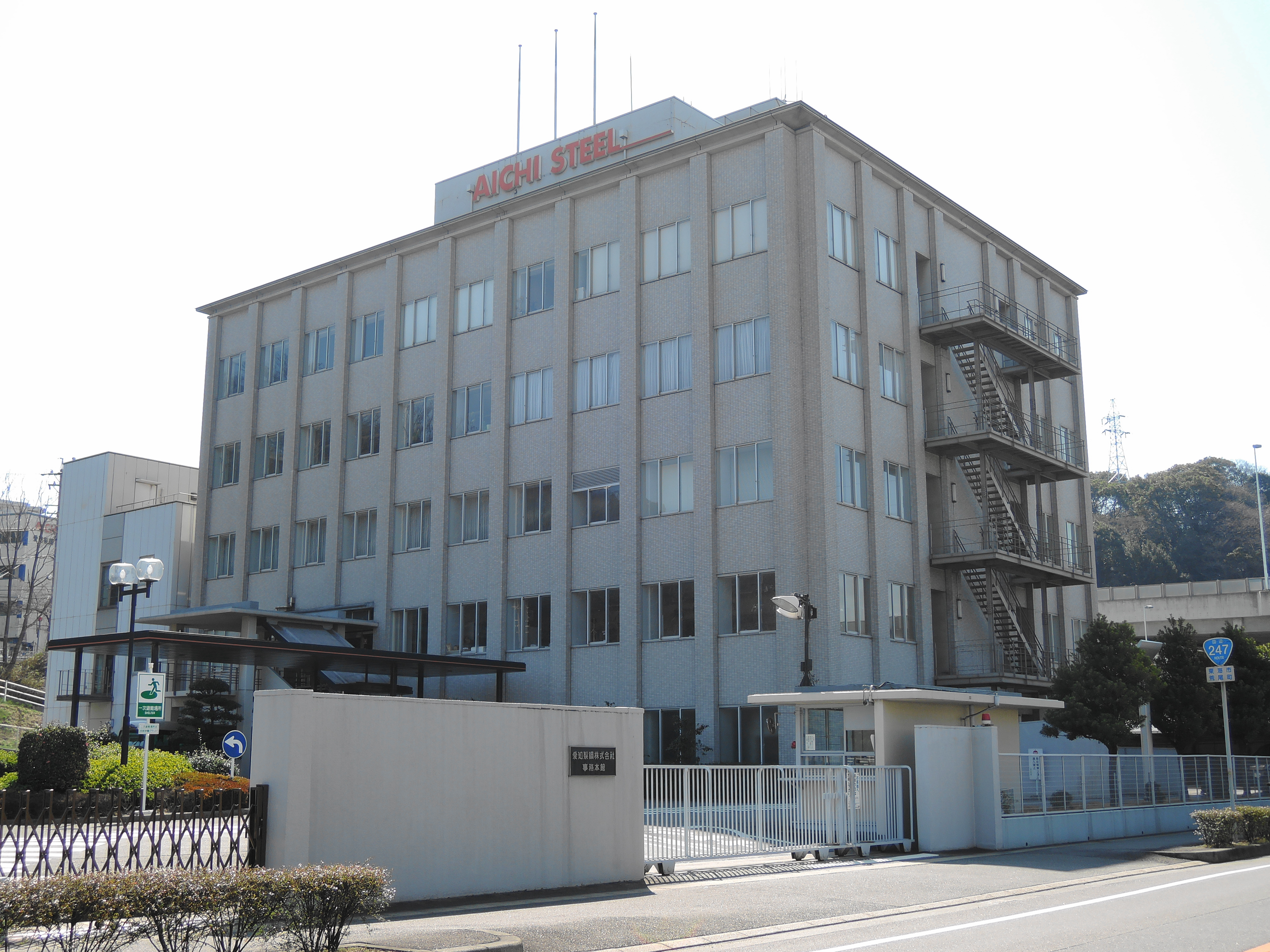
- Headquarters of Aichi Steel
- Native name: 愛知製鋼株式会社
- Type: Public (K.K)
- Traded as: TYO: 5482; NAG: 5482
- ISIN: JP3160700005
- Industry: Steel
- Founded: March 8, 1940; 86 years ago
- Headquarters: Tōkai city, Aichi Prefecture 110-8408, Japan
- Area served: Worldwide
- Key people: Takahiro Fujioka (President)
- Products: Steel; Forged steel products; Titanium products; Electro-magnetic products
- Revenue: ▲JPY 236 billion (FY 2017) (US$ 2.1 billion) (FY 2017)
- Net income: ▼JPY 8.1 billion (FY 2017) (US$ 74 million) (FY 2017)
- Number of employees: 4,773 (consolidated, as of March 31, 2017)
- Website: Official website

Aichi Steel (愛知製鋼, Aichi Seikō) is a Japanese steel manufacturer. It is a member of the Toyota Group.

== History ==
Aichi Steel was one of the earliest subsidiaries of the Toyota Group. Kiichiro Toyoda, the founder of Toyota, struggled to manufacture automobiles as the steel producers were uninterested to supply his small workshop with the steel sheets for automobiles. To address the problem, Toyoda bought his own furnace that provided his company with the casting expertise and forming equipment that would shape a car. This iron workshop became the precursor to Aichi Steel.

The company was established in 1934 as Aichi Seiko, the steel manufacturing department of Toyoda Automatic Loom Works, the predecessor to Toyota Industries. The company derived its name from Aichi Prefecture, where Toyota's headquarters and major production facilities are located. It became an independent company in 1940 and changed its name to its present one in 1945.

Today, Aichi Steel supplies 40% of the steel, springs and forged products for automotive use to members of the Toyota Group. This volume underscored Toyota's reliance on the partnership given the sophisticated nature of Aichi's manufacturing services, which few suppliers can replicate. In January 2016, a furnace explosion in one of Aichi's steel mills suspended production at Toyota's entire assembly plants for one week and threatened further disruptions to the company's operations for almost two months.
