= Koji Sato (engineer) =

Japanese mechanical engineer

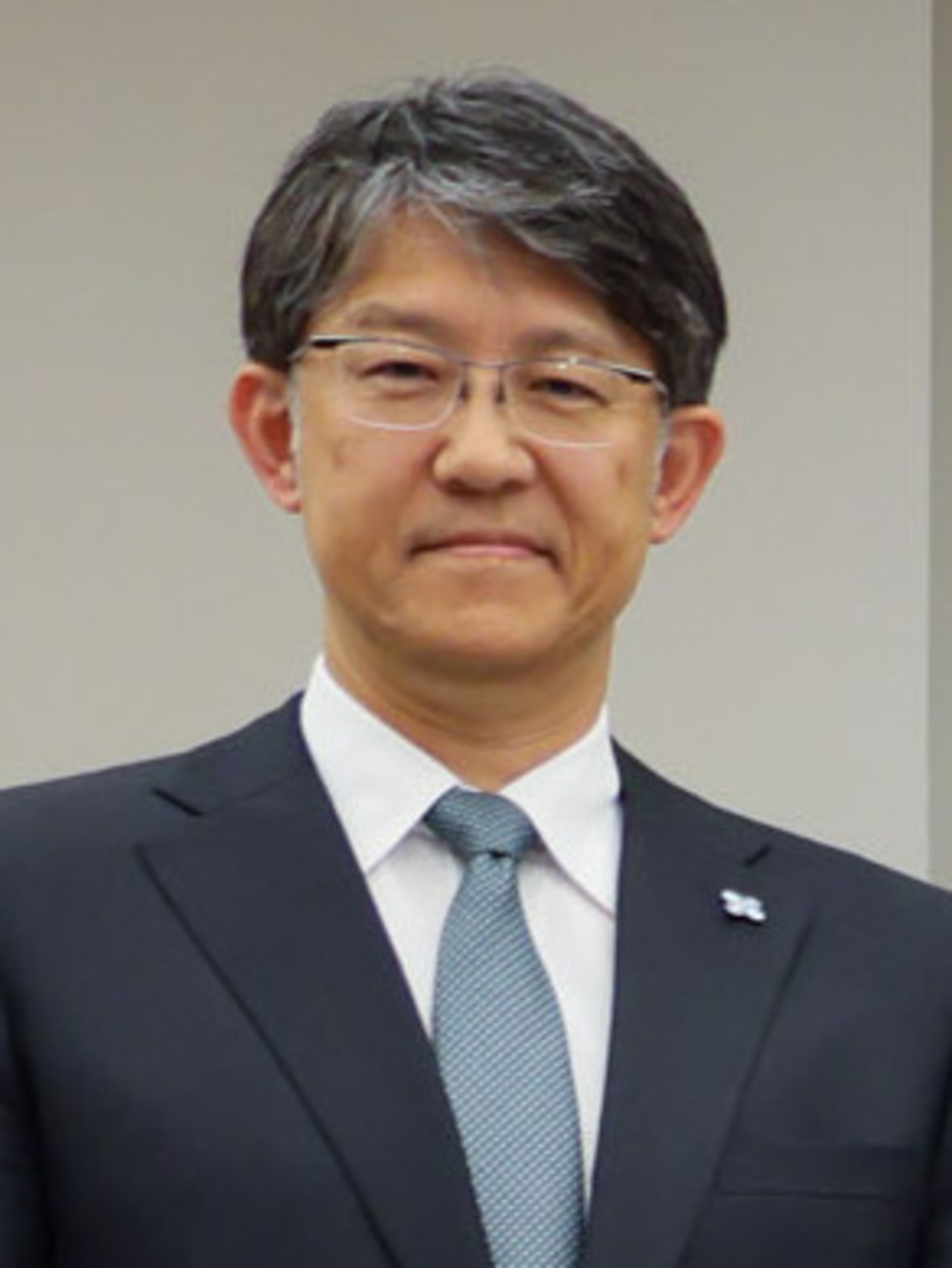
Koji Sato, 2026

Koji Sato (佐藤 恒治, Satō Kōji; born October 19, 1969) is a Japanese mechanical engineer who served as president and chief executive officer of Toyota from 2023 to 2026. He became chief executive officer in April 2023 and president in June 2023. On April 1, 2026, Kenta Kon became President and CEO of Toyota, and Satō became vice chairman and assumed a new position as chief industry officer.

== Biography ==
Kōji Satō graduated from Waseda University in 1992 with a degree in mechanical engineering and joined the Toyota Group in April of the same year. As a young engineer in the 1990s and early 2000s, Sato worked directly on project-level development: he contributed to suspension design on early hybrid models and led development for vehicles like the North American Camry. That technical grounding gave him intimate familiarity with Toyota’s core engineering and manufacturing values. Transitioning into premium/luxury and high-performance segments via Lexus and GAZOO Racing exposed him to branding, product positioning, and performance engineering. Thus, his rise to CEO in 2023 was timed with a pivotal moment for the auto industry. As CEO, there is a renewed emphasis on design, customer-centric innovation, and diversified powertrain strategies that reflect both legacy and future mobility demands.

In 2016, Satō took over the Lexus brand. In September 2020, he was also appointed President of the Motorsport/performance Division Toyota Gazoo Racing. He was made Chief Branding Officer in January 2021. In April 2023, he succeeded Akio Toyoda as CEO of Toyota. He also became the President in June 2023. In February 2026 Toyota announced its Chief financial officer Kenta Kon would take over as CEO on April 1.
