= Akio Toyoda =

Japanese business executive (born 1956)

- 豊田章男
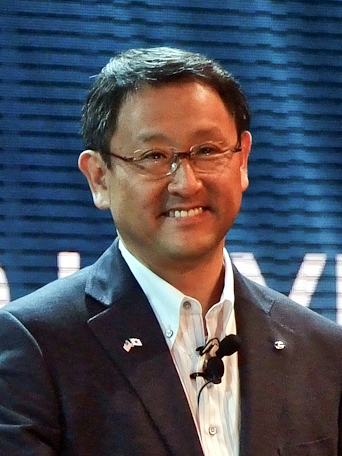
- Toyoda in 2011
- Born: 3 May 1956 (age 70); Nagoya, Aichi, Japan
- Other name: Morizo Kinoshita
- Education: Keio University; Babson College (MBA)
- Title: Chairman of Toyota
- Children: 2
- Father: Shoichiro Toyoda
- Relatives: Sakichi Toyoda (great-grandfather); Kiichiro Toyoda (grandfather); Rizaburo Toyoda (granduncle-in-law); Tatsuro Toyoda (uncle)

Akio Toyoda (豊田 章男, Toyoda Akio; born 3 May 1956), also known by his racing name Morizo Kinoshita, is a Japanese business executive who is the chairman of Toyota. He was previously the company's president and chief executive officer (CEO). Toyoda is a grandson of the founder of Toyota Motors, Kiichiro Toyoda, and a great-grandson of both the industrialist, Sakichi Toyoda, and the founder of the Takashimaya department stores corporation, Shinshichi Iida.

On 1 April 2023, Toyoda stepped down as Toyota president and became chairman of the board. Toyota's chief branding officer and president of the Lexus division, Koji Sato, succeeded Toyoda as CEO.

== Early life and education ==
Toyoda is the great-grandson of the Toyoda Automatic Loom Works founder Sakichi Toyoda, and grandson of Toyota Motor Corporation founder Kiichiro Toyoda. He was born 3 May 1956, in Nagoya, to Shoichiro Toyoda and Hiroko (née Mitsui). Toyoda's family line have long dominated the upper management of the family businesses since the days his carpenter-farmer great-great-grandfather, Ikichi Toyoda, taught his son fabrication and carpentry. Akio Toyoda was the chief contender for the family business when Katsuaki Watanabe was reassigned as Vice-Chairman in the wake of the quality control crisis.

Toyoda completed his undergraduate degree in law at Keio University and was awarded his Masters of Finance at Babson College, Massachusetts. He would join the family business in 1984.

== Career ==
As grandson of the company's founder, Toyoda joined Toyota's board of directors in 2000. In 2005, Toyoda was promoted to the position of executive vice president. In January 2009, it was announced that Toyoda was chosen as the forthcoming president of the company. On 23 June 2009, he was confirmed as the new president, along with four new executive vice presidents and eight new board members. The previous president and CEO Katsuaki Watanabe became vice chairman, replacing Katsuhiro Nakagawa.

In 2012, he was named Autocar's Man of the Year.

=== Master driver "Morizo" ===
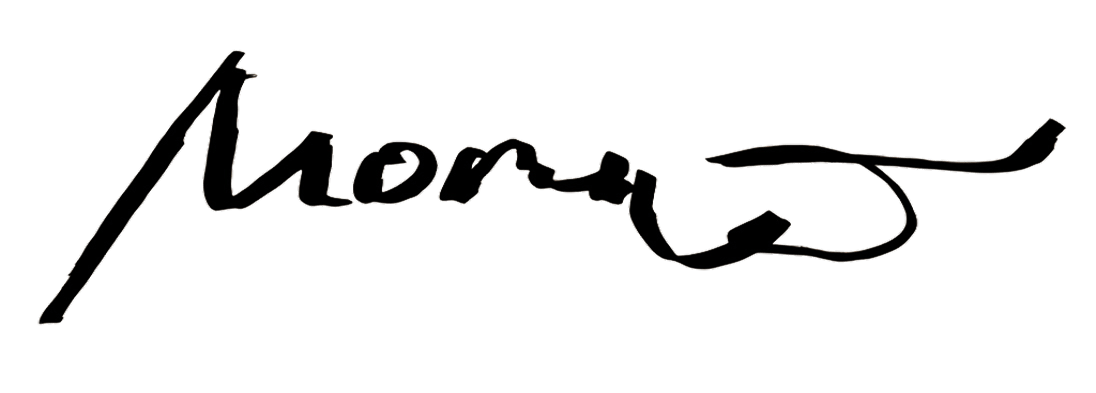
Akio's signature as a racing driver "Morizo"

As an avid auto racing fan and driver himself, Toyoda has participated in several auto races under the pseudonym Morizo Kinoshita. At the 2009 24 Hours of Nürburgring, he finished 81st overall and third in class in a Lexus IS F, and 87th overall and fourth in class with a Lexus LF-A. At the 2014 24 Hours of Nürburgring, he finished 13th overall and first in class with a Lexus LF-A. At the 2019 24 Hours of Nürburgring, he finished 40th overall and third in class with a Toyota GR Supra GT4.

In 2016, Toyota approved the project that would result in the GR Yaris; during the development of that car, Toyoda (as Morizo) served as a test driver. Morizo crashed the first test car during a mid-winter test drive at a Hokkaido track; after exiting the car on his own, he remarked that he did not "like the feel of it". As Morizo, Toyoda continued to drive development prototypes, and since the car's release, has campaigned the car in races.

=== Toyota global recalls and Congressional Statement ===
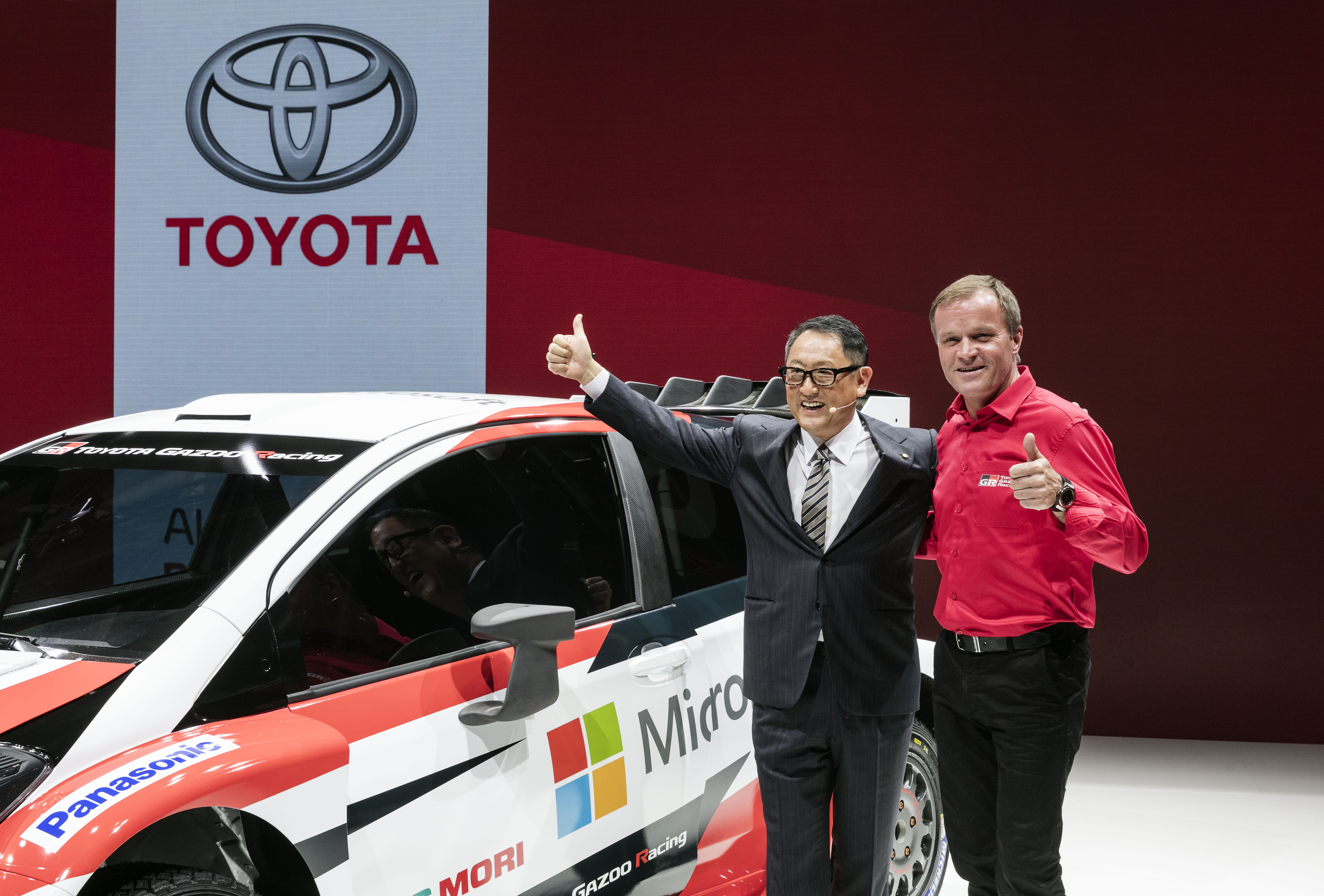
The brand new Toyota Yaris World Rally Car, set to compete in the 2017 WRC season, at the 2016 Paris Motor Show. On the left is Akio Toyoda, CEO of Toyota Motor Corporation, next to four time World Rally Drivers' Champion Tommi Mäkinen

In the wake of massive global recalls ballooning to 8.5 million vehicles, Toyoda was invited to testify before the U.S. Congress on 17 February 2010, which he accepted. A week later, he issued a prepared statement to the Congress. He focused on three key issues: Toyota's basic philosophy regarding quality control, the cause of the recalls, and "how we will manage quality control going forward". On 24 February 2010, accompanied by president and COO of Toyota Motor North America, Yoshimi Inaba, Toyoda testified before the House of Representatives' Oversight and Government Reform Committee. As the scion of a family known for their contributions to automated manufacturing, Toyoda was personally affected by the quality control crises. In his comments he is quoted as being "deeply sorry" and highlighted the relations between Toyota vehicles in the United States and Americans for fifty years.

=== Direction of Toyota ===
At a press event held on 14 December 2021, Toyota unveiled multiple concept cars with battery electric drivetrains, a sign of faith in the future of the technology. In a later interview, he said "“People are finally seeing reality." The New York Times assessed his bet on hybrid vehicles is how the company achieved its 2023 profit of 4.9 trillion yen—the highest in the company's history. Also in 2023, Toyoda stepped down from his role as CEO to become chairman.

In November 2025, Toyoda was seen at the Fuji Speedway wearing a "Make America Great Again" hat and a shirt with the pictures of Donald Trump and JD Vance.

== Family tree ==
Ikichi
Tami	Sakichi	Asako
Hatako	Kiichiro	Aiko	Rizaburo
Shoichiro	Hiroko	Tatsuro
Akio
Daisuke

Ei
Heikichi	Sasuke
Eiji	Kazuko
Kanshiro	Tetsuro	Shuhei

== Notes ==
Business positions
Preceded by Takeshi Uchiyamada	Chairman of Toyota; 2023–present	Incumbent
Preceded by Katsuaki Watanabe	President and CEO of Toyota; 2009–2023	Succeeded by Koji Sato
