= Koyo Seiko =

Japanese manufacturing company

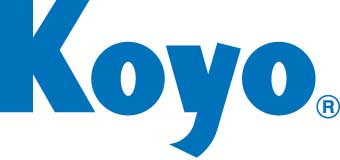

Koyo Seiko (Osaka, Japan) was established as a private company by Zenichiro Ikeda in 1921. They initially sold imported bearings but by 1935 had begun production of Koyo branded bearings under the name Koyo Seiko Co., Ltd.

Koyo merged with Toyoda Machinery Jan. 1, 2006, to become JTEKT, a leading manufacturer of ball and roller bearings, automotive steering systems, drive line products and machine tools.

Toyota had been the major investor in each company and is the major stockholder in JTEKT with about 24 percent.

Koyo Seiko has various bearing manufacturing facilities all around the world. There are manufacturing sites in Japan, UK, Europe, China and India.

Koyo is a member of World Bearing Association (WBA).
