= Sakichi Toyoda =

Japanese inventor and industrialist

Sakichi Toyoda 豊田 佐吉
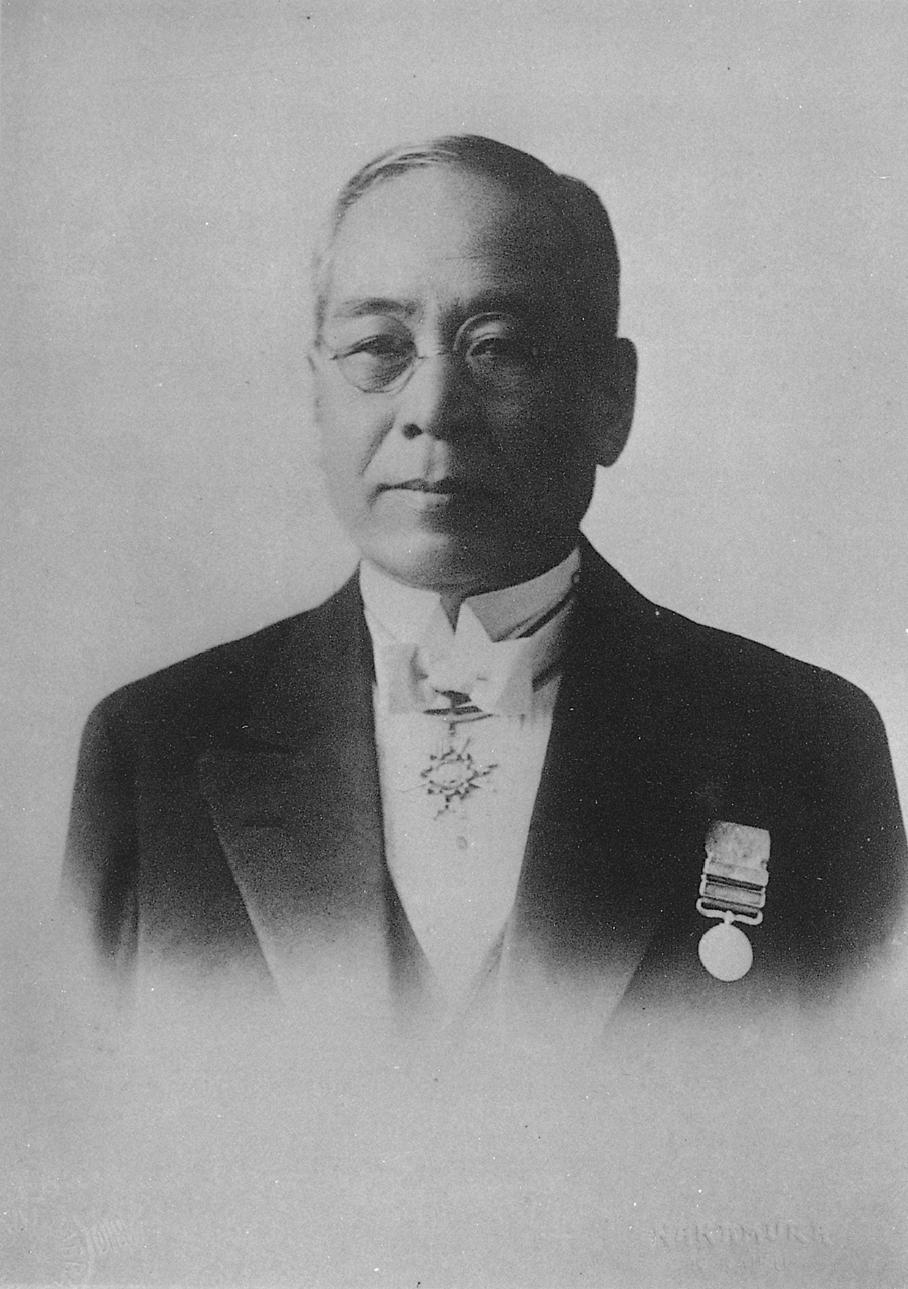
- Born: 19 March 1867; Kosai, Shizuoka, Japan
- Died: 30 October 1930 (aged 63); Nagoya, Aichi, Japan
- Occupations: Founder of Toyota Boshoku Corporation, Toyota Industries, which eventually spawned the Toyota Group
- Spouses: Tami Sahara (m. 1893; ann. 1894) Asako Toyoda (m. 1897; ann. 1900)
- Children: 2, including Kiichiro
- Relatives: Rizaburo Toyoda (son-in-law); Eiji Toyoda (nephew); Shoichiro Toyoda (grandson); Tatsuro Toyoda (grandson); Akio Toyoda (great-grandson)

Sakichi Toyoda (豊田 佐吉, Toyoda Sakichi; 19 March 1867 – 30 October 1930) was a Japanese inventor and industrialist who founded Toyoda Automatic Loom Works (later Toyota Industries). The son of a farmer and sought-after carpenter, he started the Toyoda family companies. His son, Kiichiro Toyoda, would later establish Japan's largest automaker, Toyota. Toyoda is referred to as the "King of Japanese Inventors".

== Early life and education ==
Sakichi Toyoda was born on March 19 (the 14th of the 2nd month in East Asian Lunar Calendar), 1867, in Yamaguchi, Tōtōmi Province (present-day Kosai, Shizuoka), to Ikichi and Ei Toyoda. Ikichi was a carpenter and a farmer, and he taught carpentry to his son. Sakichi's boyhood would coincide with the end of the Edo period, replaced by the Meiji and its reformist policies. Sakichi was an avid reader in his youth, and he organized a youth study group for teens. Inspired by a trip to Ueno to visit the Third National Machinery Exposition, he later revolutionized the textile industry, powered by steam, oil, and electricity.

== Toyoda Automatic Loom Works ==
Toyoda Automatic Loom Works was the engineering manufacturing company established by Sakichi Toyoda in 1926. It earned him the moniker of father of the Japanese industrial revolution. He is also the founder of Toyota Industries Co., Ltd.

Toyoda invented and innovated numerous textile-focused weaving devices, introducing innovative fueling systems used to power his Toyoda-branded machines. His most famous invention was the automatic power loom in which he implemented the principle of Jidoka (autonomous automation). The principle of Jidoka, which means that the machine stops itself when a problem occurs, became later a part of the Toyota Production System.

Toyoda developed the concept of 5 Whys: When a problem occurs, ask "why" five times to try to find the source of the problem, then put into place something to prevent the problem from recurring. This concept is used today as part of applying lean methodologies to solve problems, improve quality, and reduce costs.

The luxury vehicle Toyota Century, introduced in 1967, derived its name from the 100th birthday of Sakichi Toyoda.

On April 15, 1973, the Japan Patent Office selected him as one of Ten Japanese Great Inventors.

== Family tree ==
Ikichi
Tami	Sakichi	Asako
Hatako	Kiichiro	Aiko	Rizaburo
Shoichiro	Hiroko	Tatsuro
Akio
Daisuke

Ei
Heikichi	Sasuke
Eiji	Kazuko
Kanshiro	Tetsuro	Shuhei
