= Katsuaki Watanabe =

Senior advisor of Toyota

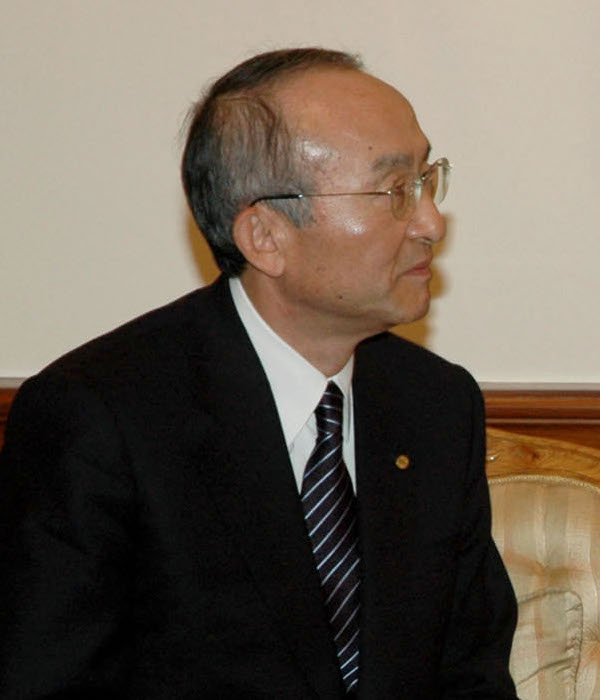
- Katsuaki Watanabe in 2008
- Born: February 13, 1943 (age 83); Mie Prefecture, Japan
- Occupations: Senior advisor, Toyota Motor Corporation

Katsuaki Watanabe (渡辺 捷昭, Watanabe Katsuaki; born February 13, 1943) is senior advisor at Toyota Motor Corporation. He was president and CEO of the company before Akio Toyoda assumed those positions on June 23, 2009.

Watanabe, who earned a degree in economics from Tokyo's Keio University, joined Toyota upon graduating from that university in 1964. He has gained experience in a broad range of activities at Toyota, primarily in corporate planning and administrative affairs. Watanabe became the general manager of the secretarial division in 1988 and moved to the Corporate Planning division as general manager in 1989.

In his work as general manager of the Corporate Planning division, Watanabe participated in charting and articulating a common, long-term vision for Toyota operations around the world. Named to the Board of Directors in 1992, he continued to supervise work in production control, including supervising Toyota's Motomachi Plant, which makes passenger cars. In 1999, Watanabe was appointed senior managing director, after which he assumed the position of executive vice-president in 2001. In June 2005 he became president and CEO of TMC, succeeding Fujio Cho.

Watanabe is regarded as having made the key decision to build a manufacturing plant in San Antonio, Texas U.S.A to build full-size pick-up trucks.

Watanabe was born in 1942 in Mie Prefecture, Japan, and now lives in Toyota City. He was married and has three daughters. An amateur musician, he sings in a men's choir, and he also likes to play golf and tennis.

He was listed as one of TIME magazine's 100 most influential people of 2005 and again in 2007.

== Honours ==
- Grand Cordon of the Order of the Rising Sun (2018)

== See also ==
- Toyota Production System (TPS)
- 2009–2010 Toyota vehicle recalls

Business positions
Preceded by Fujio Cho	President and CEO of Toyota; 2005-2009	Succeeded by Akio Toyoda
