= JTEKT =

Japanese automotive components manufacturing company

JTEKT Corporation 株式会社ジェイテクト
- Company type: Public (K.K)
- Traded as: TYO: 6473
- Founded: January 2006; 20 years ago
- Headquarters: Osaka, Japan
- Key people: Tetsuo Agata
- Products: Steering Systems; Driveline Components; Machine tools; Home accessories; Ball & Roller Bearings
- Revenue: 1441,1 billion yen (FY 2017)
- Number of employees: 40,756 (Consolidated); 10,563 (Nonconsolidated)
- Parent: Toyota Group
- Website: jtekt.co.jp

JTEKT Corporation TYO: 6473.T is a Japanese corporation created in January 2006 upon the merger of two companies: Koyo Seiko Co. and Toyoda Machine Works.

Toyoda Machine Works, Machine tool sales for North, Central and South America, aftermarket support services, machine re-manufacturing and engineering services supplied by Jtekt Toyoda Americas Corporation H.Q. Arlington Heights, Illinois and the Re-manufactured Products Division operate out of Wixom, Michigan, with support offices in Monterrey, Mexico and Itu, Brazil. JTEKT Corporation machine tools are manufactured in Japan by the JTEKT Corporation, and in Taiwan, by WELE Mechatronics, a "Toyoda Strategic Alliance Company", and exported globally.

== Business Areas ==
- Bearings (KOYO)
- Driveline Components (JTEKT)
- Machine Tools (TOYODA, WELE MECHATRONICS)
- Steering Products (JTEKT)
- Motion Controllers

== JTEKT North America ==
JTEKT North America is a separate legal entity headed by COO Gary Bourque who reports to the CEO (Keita Mizuno). There are several locations of operations throughout the United States, Canada, and Mexico.

In 2009, JTEKT NA purchased the needle bearing business (automotive bearings) from Timken. The needle roller bearing business was a part of the Torrington Company which Timken purchased in 2003. JTEKT gained five manufacturing locations along with a technical center and a business office in North America, as well as eight other locations worldwide.

Headquarters

- JTEKT - A-TEC in Plymouth, MI
- Koyo - Industrial Sales in Westlake, OH and Automotive in Greenville, SC
- Toyoda Machinery - in Arlington Heights, IL

Technical Centers

- JTEKT - A-TEC in Plymouth, MI
- JTEKT - JSCI in Halifax, NS
- Koyo - GTC in Greenville, SC
- Jtekt Toyoda Americas COrp. - Northeast Tech Center in Shrewsbury, MA Upper Midwest Tech Center in New Brighton, MN West Coast Tech Center Placentia, CA Mexico sales office Monterrey, Mexico Brazil Tech center Itu, São Paulo, Brazil.

Manufacturing Locations

- JATM - Steering/Driveline Plant in Morristown, TN
- JATV - Steering Plant in Vonore, TN
- JATX - Steering Plant in Ennis, TX
- JASC - Driveline Plant in Piedmont, SC
- Koyo Washington - Taper Roller Bearing Plant in Telford, TN
- Koyo Richland - Wheel Hub Bearing Plant in Blythewood, SC
- Koyo Orangeburg - Taper Roller Bearing in Orangeburg, SC
- Walhalla (Classic Torrington) - Thrust Bearing Plant in Walhalla, SC
- Cairo (Classic Torrington) - Bearings in Cairo, GA
- Sylvania (Classic Torrington) - Drawn Cup Bearings in Sylvania, GA
- Dahlonega (Classic Torrington) - Loose Needle Rollers in Dahlonega, GA
- Bedford (Classic Torrington) - Planet Shafts in Bedford, Quebec
- Koyo Canada Inc. (Classic Torrington) Canadian Warehouse and Operations Burlington, Ontario
