= Toyota Prefectural Natural Park =

Natural park of Yamaguchi prefecture, Japan

Coordinates: 34°14′43″N 131°7′19″E

- 豊田県立自然公園
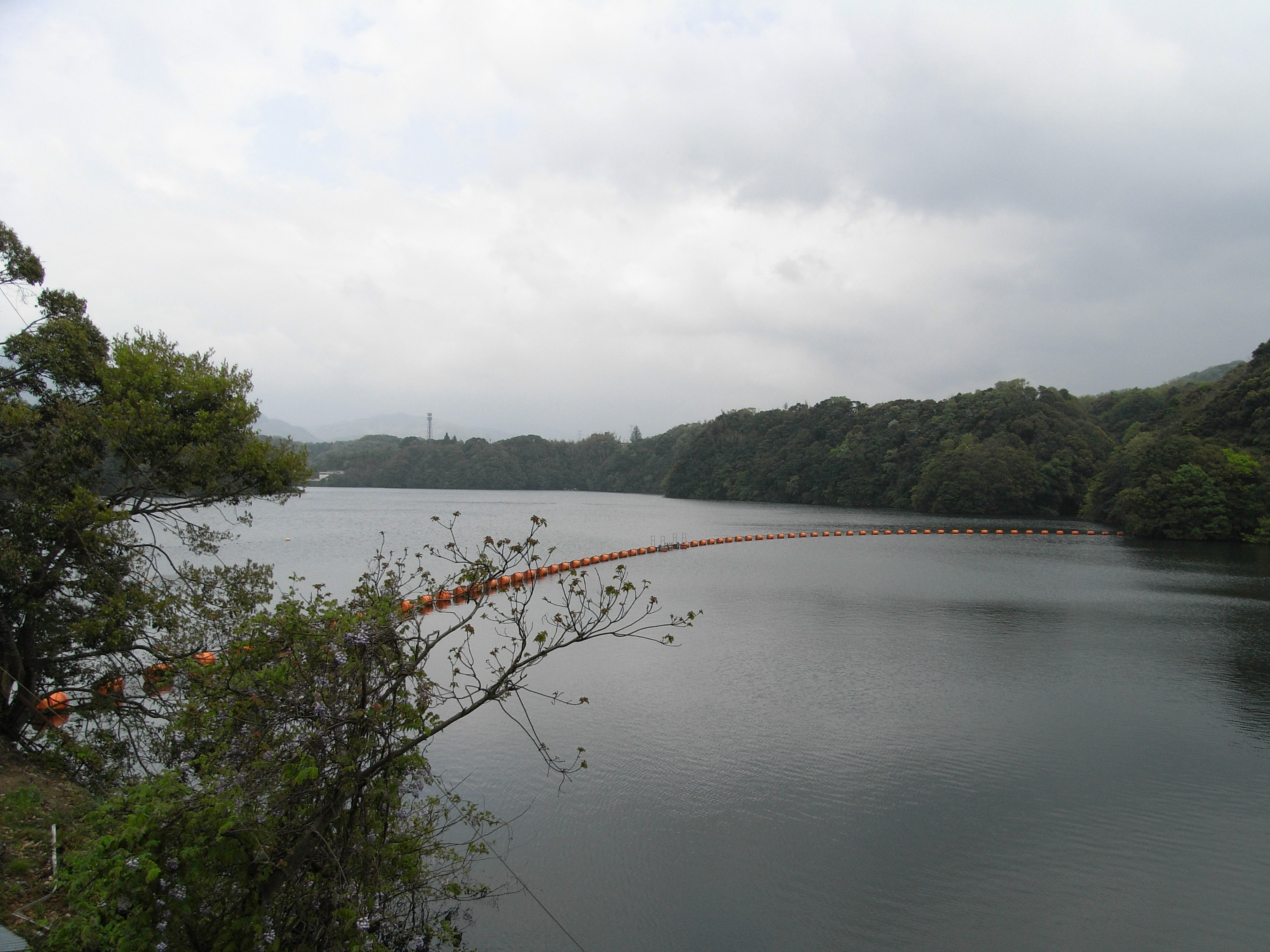
- Lake Toyota
- Interactive map of Toyota Prefectural Natural Park
- Location: Yamaguchi Prefecture, Japan
- Nearest city: Shimonoseki
- Area: 36.67 km^{2} (14.16 sq mi)
- Established: 1 March 1962

Toyota Prefectural Natural Park (豊田県立自然公園, Toyota kenritsu shizen kōen) is a Prefectural Natural Park in western Yamaguchi Prefecture, Japan. Established in 1962, the park is wholly within the municipality of Shimonoseki.

== See also ==
- National Parks of Japan
