= Tatsuro Toyoda =

Japanese businessman (1930–2017)

- 豊田達郎
- Born: 1 June 1930
- Died: 30 December 2017 (aged 87)
- Education: First Higher School; University of Tokyo (MEng); Stern School of Business (MBA)
- Father: Kiichiro Toyoda
- Relatives: Sakichi Toyoda (grandfather); Rizaburo Toyoda (uncle-in-law); Eiji Toyoda (first cousin once removed); Shoichiro Toyoda (brother); Akio Toyoda (nephew)

Tatsuro Toyoda (Japanese: 豊田達郎, Hepburn: Toyoda Tatsurō; June 1, 1930 – Deсember 30, 2017) was the brother of Shoichiro and the son of Toyota Motor Corporation founder, Kiichiro Toyoda.

== Non-TMC posts ==
- Intl. trustee, International House (1991–2017)
- Honorary consul (Nagoya), Denmark (1991–2017)
- Representative director, Institute for International Economic Studies (1996–2017)
- Senior advisor and member of the board, Toyota Central R&D Labs (2002–2017)
- Chairman, Toyota Technological Institute at Chicago (2002–2017)
- Representative director, Genesis Research Institute, Inc. (2009–2017)
- Chairman of the board, Toyota Technological Institute (2009–2017)
- Honorary chairman, Toyota Foundation (June 2009–December 2017)

== Awards and citations ==
- Medal with Blue Ribbon, Japan, 1992
- National Order of the Southern Cross, Brazil, 1994
- Grand Cordon of the Order of the Sacred Treasure, Japan, 1999
- Knight of the Order of the Dannebrog, Denmark, 1999

== Family tree ==
Ikichi
Tami	Sakichi	Asako
Hatako	Kiichiro	Aiko	Rizaburo
Shoichiro	Hiroko	Tatsuro
Akio
Daisuke

Ei
Heikichi	Sasuke
Eiji	Kazuko
Kanshiro	Tetsuro	Shuhei
