= Eiji Toyoda =

Japanese industrialist (1913–2013)

Eiji Toyoda 豊田 英二
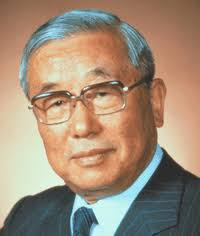
- Born: 12 September 1913; Nagoya, Aichi, Japan
- Died: 17 September 2013 (aged 100); Toyota, Aichi, Japan
- Education: Tokyo Imperial University
- Title: President (1967–1981) and Chairman (1981–1994), Toyota Motor Corporation
- Spouse: Kazuko Toyoda (died 2002)
- Children: 3
- Relatives: Sakichi Toyoda (uncle); Kiichiro Toyoda (cousin); Rizaburo Toyoda (cousin-in-law); Shoichiro Toyoda (first cousin once removed); Tatsuro Toyoda (first cousin once removed); Akio Toyoda (first cousin twice removed)

Eiji Toyoda (豊田 英二, Toyoda Eiji; 12 September 1913 – 17 September 2013) was a Japanese engineer and industrialist. He was largely responsible for bringing Toyota Motor Corporation to profitability and worldwide prominence during his tenure as president and later, as chairman. He was succeeded as the president of Toyota by Shoichiro Toyoda.

== Career ==
Toyoda studied mechanical engineering at Tokyo Imperial University from 1933 to 1936. During this time his cousin Kiichiro established an automobile plant at the Toyoda Automatic Loom Works in the city of Nagoya in central Japan. Toyoda joined his cousin in the plant at the conclusion of his degree and throughout their lives they shared a deep friendship. In 1938, Kiichiro asked Eiji to oversee construction of a newer factory about 32 km east of Nagoya on the site of a red pine forest in the town of Koromo, later renamed Toyota City. Known as the Honsha ("headquarters") plant, to this day it is considered the "mother factory" for Toyota Motor production facilities worldwide.

Toyoda visited Ford River Rouge Complex at Dearborn, Michigan, during the early 1950s. He was awed by the scale of the facility but dismissive of what he saw as its inefficiencies. Toyota Motor had been in the business of manufacturing cars for 13 years at this stage, and had produced just over 2,500 automobiles. The Ford plant in contrast manufactured 8,000 vehicles a day. Due to this experience, Toyoda decided to adopt American automobile mass production methods but with a qualitative twist.

Toyoda collaborated with Taiichi Ohno, a veteran loom machinist, to develop core concepts of what later became known as the 'Toyota Production System', such as the Kanban system of labeling parts used on assembly lines, which was an early precursor to bar codes. They also fine-tuned the concept of Kaizen, a process of incremental but constant improvements designed to cut production and labor costs while boosting overall quality.

As a managing director of Toyota Motor, Toyoda failed in his first attempt to crack the U.S. market with the underpowered Toyota Crown sedan in the 1950s, but he succeeded with the Toyota Corolla compact in 1968, a year after taking over as president of the company. During the car's development phase, Toyoda, as executive vice-president, had to overcome the objections of then-president Fukio Nakagawa to install a newly developed 1.0-liter engine, air conditioning and automatic transmissions in the Corolla.

Appointed the fifth president of Toyota Motor, Toyoda went on to become the company's longest serving chief executive thus far. In 1981, he stepped down as president and assumed the title of chairman. He was succeeded as president by Shoichiro Toyoda. In 1983, as chairman, Eiji decided to compete in the luxury car market, which culminated in the 1989 introduction of Lexus. Toyoda stepped down as chairman of Toyota in 1994 at the age of 81.

== Later years and death ==
In his later years, Toyoda was hospitalised for hip problems, and needed to use a wheelchair for a time, yet remained affable and enjoyed tackling sudoku puzzles. He spent most of his last years undergoing treatment at the Toyota Memorial Hospital in Toyota City, Japan, close to company headquarters.

Five days after his 100th birthday, Toyoda died of heart failure in the Toyota Memorial Hospital on 17 September 2013. Paying tribute to Toyoda, David Cole, former chairman of the Center for Automotive Research, said "He was a real visionary and inspirational leader who understood what it would take to make Toyota a successful company." Leslie Kendall, curator of the Petersen Automotive Museum, described Toyoda as the Japanese equivalent of Henry Ford.

== Honours ==
=== Japanese ===
- April 1971 – Medal of Honor with Blue Ribbon
- November 1983 – Grand Cordon of the Order of the Sacred Treasure
- November 1990 – Grand Cordon of the Order of the Rising Sun

=== Non-Japanese ===
- March 1985 – Commander of the Order of Prince Henry of Portugal (ComIH)
- December 1990 – Knight Commander of the Order of the White Elephant of Thailand
- April 1991 – Grand Officer of the Order of the Crown of Belgium
- April 1992 – Knight Grand Cross of the Order of the Crown of Thailand
- September 1993 – Honorary Companion of the Order of Australia (AC)
- 1994 – Automotive Hall of Fame, USA
- May 2001 – Knight Grand Cross of the Order of the Direkgunabhorn of Thailand

== Family tree ==
Born into a family of textile manufacturers, Eiji Toyoda is the son of Heikichi Toyoda (1875–1954), the brother of Toyoda Loom Works founder Sakichi Toyoda. The descendants of Sakichi Toyoda have long dominated the upper management of Toyota Motors, which was incorporated in 1937. Eiji Toyoda died in September 2013. With his wife, Kazuko Toyoda (died 2002), he had three sons (Kanshiro, Tetsuro and Shuhei) and many grandchildren.

Ikichi
Tami | Sakichi | Asako
Hatako | Kiichiro | Aiko | Rizaburo
Shoichiro | Hiroko | Tatsuro
Akio
Daisuke

Ei
Heikichi | Sasuke
Eiji | Kazuko
Kanshiro | Tetsuro | Shuhei

== Footnotes ==
Business positions
| Preceded by Fukio Nakagawa | President of Toyota; 1967–1982 | Succeeded by Shoichiro Toyoda |
| Preceded by New post | Chairman of Toyota; 1982–1994 | Succeeded by Shoichiro Toyoda |
