= Toyota Boshoku =

Japanese automotive component manufacturer

Toyota Boshoku Corporation トヨタ紡織株式会社
- Company type: Public
- Traded as: TYO: 3116
- Industry: Automotive
- Founded: January 1918; 108 years ago
- Founder: Sakichi Toyoda
- Headquarters: Kariya, Japan
- Area served: Worldwide
- Key people: Shuhei Toyoda (Chairman) Yoshimasa Ishii (President)
- Revenue: 1,953,625,000,000 yen (2024)
- Number of employees: 46,972 (2024)
- Website: www.toyota-boshoku.com

Toyota Boshoku Corporation (トヨタ紡織株式会社, Toyota Boshoku Kabushikigaisha; TYO: 3116) is a Japanese automotive component manufacturer. It is a member of the Toyota Group of companies. Toyota Boshoku Corporation entered the North American market via Toyota Boshoku America (located, inter alia, in Erlanger, Kentucky).

== History ==
Toyoda Boshoku Corporation was founded by inventor Sakichi Toyoda in 1918, as a textile company. In 1942, it merged with its affiliates and became known as the Chuo Spinning Company, which then merged with the Toyota Motor Corporation in 1943.

In 1950, the Minsei Spinning Co., Ltd established itself as a separate entity from Toyota Motor Corporation. Its name was changed back to Toyoda Boshoku Corporation in 1967, and the company entered the automotive components field beginning in 1972.

The merger between Toyoda Boshoku Corporation, ARACO Corporation, and Takanichi Co., Ltd. in October 2004 led to the company Toyota Boshoku as it is today.

== Lines of business ==
- Development of automotive interior systems; manufacture and sales of automotive interior products
- Manufacture and sales of automotive filters and powertrain components
- Manufacture and sales of other automotive components
- Production and sales of fabric goods
